= List of monastic houses in England =

Monastic houses in England include abbeys, priories and friaries, among other monastic religious houses. The sites are listed by modern (post-1974) county.

== Overview ==
Mapped links to subsections of this article

The list is presented in alphabetical order of ceremonial county. Foundations are listed alphabetically within each county.

Communities/provenance: shows the status and communities existing at each establishment, together with such dates as have been established as well as the fate of the establishment after dissolution, and the current status of the site.

Formal name or dedication is the formal name of the establishment or the person in whose name the church is dedicated, where known.

Some of the establishments have had alternative names over the course of time; such alternatives in name or spelling have been given.

Alien houses are included, as are smaller establishments such as cells and notable monastic granges (particularly those with resident monks), and also camerae of the military orders of monks (Knights Templars and Knights Hospitaller). The numerous monastic hospitals per se are not included here unless at some time the foundation had, or was purported to have the status or function of an abbey, priory, friary or preceptor/commandery.

The name of the county is given where there is reference to an establishment in another county. Where the county has changed since the foundation's dissolution the modern county is given in parentheses, and in instances where the referenced foundation ceased to exist before the unification of England, the kingdom is given, followed by the modern county in parentheses.

== Abbreviations and key ==
Sites listed are ruins unless indicated
*	current monastic function
^{+}	current non-monastic ecclesiastic function (including remains incorporated into later structure)
^	current non-ecclesiastic function (including remains incorporated into later structure) or redundant intact structure
^{$}	remains limited to earthworks etc.
^{#}	no identifiable trace of the monastic foundation remains
^{~}	indicates exact site of monastic foundation unknown
^{≈}	identification ambiguous or confused

Locations with names in italics indicate probable duplication (misidentification with another location) or non-existent foundations (either erroneous reference or proposed foundation never implemented) or ecclesiastical establishments with a monastic appellation but lacking monastic connection.

Trusteeship
EH	English Heritage
LT	Landmark Trust
NT	National Trust for Places of Historic Interest or Natural Beauty

== Alphabetical listing ==
=== Bedfordshire ===
Foundation	Image	Communities and provenance	Formal name or dedication and alternative names
Beadlow Priory ^{$}		Benedictine monks — from Milbrook dependent on St Albans, Hertfordshire founded 1140/6 by Henry d'Albini; abandoned 1435, reverted to the Crown, the buildings falling into decay thereafter	Saint Mary Magdalen ____________________; Beaulieu Priory
Bedford Greyfriars ^{#}		Franciscan Friars Minor, Conventual (under the custody of Oxford); founded 1238 by Mabilea de Plateshull; dissolved c.1539; granted to John Gostwyke	Saint Francis
Bedford Abbey ^{#}		Benedictine monks founded before 971; ceased to exist decades before 1066 (possibly destroyed in raids by the Danes 1010);	
Bedford Priory ^{+}		secular canons collegiate founded before 1066; Augustinian Canons Regular founded c.1165-6 by Simon Beauchamp; transferred to new site at Newnham c.1080; current parish church of St Paul built on site from 14th century	
Bushmead Priory ^		Augustinian Canons Regular founded 1195 by Hugh Beauchamp; dissolved 1536; granted to Sir William Gascoign; refectory incorporated into mansion built on site; (EH)	The Priory Church of Saint Mary, Bushmead ____________________; Bissemede Priory
Caldwell Priory ^{#}		Augustinian Canons Regular — Holy Sepulchre founded c.1154 (1153) (early in the reign of Henry II, or during that of Stephen) by Simon Basket (Barescote?), Alderman of Bedford, or a member of the Barescote family, or between 1199 and 1216 (during the reign of John): land granted by Robert of Houghton, confirmed by Henry III, or between 1199 and 1216 (during the reign of John): land granted by Robert of Houghton, confirmed by Henry III; Augustinian Canons Regular before c.1280; dissolved 1536; granted to Thomas Leigh c.1562	The Priory Church of Saint John the Baptist at Caldwell ____________________; Cauldwell Priory
Chicksands Priory ^		Gilbertine Canons and Canonesses — double house founded c. 1150 (1147) by Pain de Beauchamp and his wife, Rose (Roese/Roais) or c.1154; dissolved 1538; granted to London grocer Richard Snow; cloisters incorporated into private house; Crown Property 1936; in grounds of Military base to 1995; restored by MOD 1997–8	Saint Mary ____________________; Chicksand Priory
Dunstable Blackfriars ^{#}		Dominican Friars (under the Visitation of Cambridge) founded 1259 at the invitation of King Henry III and his consort; dissolved before 8 May 1539	
Dunstable Priory ^{+}		Augustinian Canons Regular founded 1131 (or before 1125?) by Henry I; dissolved 1540; granted to Sir Leonard Chamberlayne nave of church now in parochial use	The Priory Church of Saint Peter, Dunstable ____________________; Dunstaple Priory
Elstow Abbey ^{+}		Benedictine nuns founded 1078 by Judith, niece of William the Conqueror; dissolved 1539; granted to Sir Humphrey Radcliff c.1553; nave now in use as parish church	The Abbey Church of Saint Mary and Saint Helena, Elstow
Grovebury Priory ^{#}, Leighton Buzzard		Fontévrault Benedictine monks and nuns, double house alien house: cell dependent on Fontévrault manor granted after 1164 by Henry II; founded after 1189; conventual house possibly never properly established, becoming a chapel with resident chaplains and manor with rental tenants; occasional royal residence; dissolved 1414; farmhouse built on site	La Grave Priory; Leighton Buzzard Priory; Grovesbury Priory
Hardwick Preceptory ^{#}		Knights Hospitaller founded before(?) 1279 dissolved before(?) 1489	
Harrold Priory ^{#}		Augustinian Canonesses — Arroasian under protection and guidance of (possibly lay) brothers (see immediately below) alien house: daughter house of Arrouaise, Normandy founded 1138 by Sampson le Forte; ceded to Great Missenden, Buckinghamshire 1177; Augustinian Canonesses became denizen: independent from 1188; dissolved 1536; granted to William Lord Parr site occupied by farmhouse and a mansion named 'Harrold Hall', built 1608–1610	The Priory Church of the Blessed Virgin Mary and Saint Peter, Harrold ____________________; Harwood Priory
Harrold Priory Cell ^{~}		Augustinian Canons Regular — Arroasian (or possibly lay-brothers) attached to the nunnery (see immediately above) founded c.1136-8; dissolved before 1181	
Leighton Buzzard Cell ^{#}		Cistercian monks cell or grange? dependent on Woburn; founded before 1159	
Markyate Priory	See List of monastic houses in Hertfordshire		
Melchbourne Preceptory		Knights Hospitaller founded before 1176 by Lady Alice de Claremonte, Countess of Pembroke; dissolved 1486; held by the prior of England from 1489, de facto losing its status as a preceptory; granted to John, Earl of Bedford 1550/1; restored to the Knights by Queen Mary	Melchbourne Priory; Melchburn Preceptory; Mechelburn Preceptory
Millbrook Priory ^{#}		Benedictine monks priory cell dependent on St Albans, Hertfordshire; founded 1097-1119: church granted to St Albans by Nigel de Waste; transferred to (/merged with) Beadlow 1143; dissolved 1140–6	Saint Michael ____________________; Millbrook Cell
Newnham Priory ^{#}		Augustinian Canons Regular — from Bedford Priory (collegiate church of St Paul) (community founded at Bedford c.1165) transferred here c.1180; dissolved 1540; granted to Urian Brereton 1540/1	Saint Paul ____________________; Newenham Priory; Newenham by Bedford Priory
Pulloxhill Grange		Augustinian Canons Regular grange of Dunstable; dissolved; granted to Sir William Pagett 1547	
Ruxox Cell		Augustinian Canons Regular cell/chapel for retired brothers from Dunstable; founded before 1189; dissolved after 1290	chapel dedicated to St Nicholas ____________________; Rokesac
Turvey Abbey *		Benedictine nuns extant; adjacent to Benedictine monastery	The Priory of Our Lady of Peace
Turvey monastery *		Benedictine monks founded 1980; extant; adjacent to Benedictine Abbey	The Monastery of Christ our Saviour
Warden Abbey ^{#}		Cistercian monks founded 1136 by Walter Espec; dissolved (surrendered by the abbot and monks) 4 December 1538; Elizabethan house built on site (of which exist only remnants) renovated 1974; (LT)	The Abbey Church of the Blessed Virgin Mary, Old Warden ____________________; St Mary de Sartis Abbey; Old Warden Abbey; Wardon Abbey
Woburn Abbey ^{#}		Cistercian monks daughter house of Fountains, Yorkshire founded 28 May 1145 by Hugh de Bolebec; dissolved 1538; granted to John Lord Russell 1547/8 site now occupied by a mansion, estate and safari park	The Abbey Church of the Blessed Virgin Mary, Woburn Abbey

Return to top of page

=== Berkshire ===
Foundation	Image	Communities & provenance	Formal name or dedication and alternative names
Ankerwycke Priory, Wraysbury		Benedictine nuns founded c.1160 by Gilbert de Mountfitchet, Kt., Lord of Wyrardisbury and his son; dissolved before 8 July 1536; granted to Lord Windsor 1538/9 then to Sir Thomas Smith 1550/1 ruins in grounds of Ankerwycke House	The Priory Church of Saint Mary Magdalene, Ankerwyke ____________________; Ankerwick Priory; Ankerwyke Priory
Ascot Priory *, Winkfield		Anglican nuns founded 1861; extant	The Priory Church of Jesus Christ
Bisham Abbey ^{#}		Augustinian Canons Regular priory founded 1337 by William Montacute; built to the northeast of the site of the former Knights Templars' preceptory (see immediately below) dissolved 1536; Benedictine monks abbey founded 1537 by Henry VIII; the abbey incorporating parts of the former Knights Templars' structure; (transferred from Chertsey, Surrey); dissolved 1538; granted to Sir Edward Hoby c.1554; extant preceptory & demolished priory/abbey site now headquarters of the National Sports Council	The Priory Church of the Jesus Christ and the Blessed Virgin Mary, Bisham The Abbey Church of the Holy Trinity, Bisham ____________________; Bustlesham Priory;
Bisham Preceptory ^{#}		Knights Templar founded before 1139 by Robert de Ferrers; dissolved 1308–12; Augustinian priory later founded to northeast of site (see immediately above); extant preceptory & demolished priory/abbey site now headquarters of the National Sports Council	
Bradfield Abbey ^{~}		monks documented 1066 land granted by King Ine to Hean, Abbot of Abingdon, and Ceolswyth 688-90 to found a monastery; community included monks, status and site otherwise unknown	
Bradley Priory ^{~}		Benedictine monks dependent on Abingdon Abbey (Oxfordshire) manor, described in 1547 as 'lately a priory'; status and site otherwise unknown	
Bromhall Priory ^{#}, Sunningdale		Benedictine nuns daughter house of Chertsey, Surrey; founded before 1200 by Edward, the Black Prince; accidentally burnt 1462; dissolved 1521 when the last prioress died and the remaining sisters left; given to St John's College, Cambridge remains destroyed or incorporated into farm buildings	The Priory Church of Saint Margaret, Bromhall ____________________; Broomhall Priory
Cold Ash Centre *		Franciscan Friars Minor and sisters Novitiate house for the Franciscan Missionaries of Mary founded 1930s; extant	The Cold Ash Centre
Cookham Abbey ^{~}		probable double monastery founded before 726; granted to Canterbury by Æthelbald of Mercia; confiscated by Offa and Coenwulf; restored before 798; granted by Archbishop Æthelheard to Cynethryth, an abbess; site now occupied by parochial church	
Donnington Friary ^		Crouched Friars founded before 1404 (1392/3), land granted by Sir Richard Abberbury to the London Friary c.1376; dissolved 1538 (recorded at suppression as Trinitarian, later corrected to Crossed Friars); site now occupied by country house named 'The Priory'	Donington Friary
Douai Abbey *, Woolhampton		Benedictine monks (community founded at Douai, Belgium, 1615) removed from Douai 1903; extant	The Abbey Church of Saint Edmund, King and Martyr, Upper Woolhampton
Greenham Preceptory ^{~}		Knights Hospitaller founded c.1180 (1199) on estates granted by Matilda Countess of Clare and Gervase Paynell; last preceptor d. 1442; made part of the estate of the prior of England by the grand master of Rhodes 1445 dissolved 1540; briefly restored under Queen Mary	
Hurley Priory ^{+}		Benedictine monks founded before 1087 (1065) granted by Godfrey de Magna Villa (Mandeville) to the Benedictines of Westminster to found a cell; dissolved 1536; granted to Leonard Chamberleyn c.1544 nave of church now in parochial use	The Priory Church of the Blessed Virgin Mary, Hurley
Kintbury Abbey ^{#}		possible Saxon abbey, minuter or oratory founded before 931, not mentioned in Domesday survey; land granted to Fontevrault Benedictine nuns and brothers 1147 by Robert Le Bossu to found a monastery; transferred to new site at Nuneaton, Warwickshire 1155; planned refoundation probably never established	Saint Mary
Poughley Priory ^		Augustinian Canons Regular founded c.1160 by Ralph de Chaddleworth; dissolved 1524 and granted to Cardinal Wolsey's college at Oxford and was occupied by scholars of the college; remains (cellar range) now incorporated into after-dissolution farmhouse without public access	The Priory Church of Saint Margaret, Poughley
Reading Abbey		Cluniac monks founded 1121 by Henry I Benedictine monks refounded c.1210; dissolved 1539; granted to Edward, Duke of Somerset c.1550; quarried and dismantled c.1550-1643 ruins extant	The Abbey Church of Our Lady and Saint John the Evangelist, Reading
Reading Nunnery		nuns founded 979 dissolved 1016; granted to Battle, Sussex by William the Conqueror; apparently on the site now occupied by St Mary's Minster Church (restored 1551-1555 with masonry and timbers from the demolished Reading Abbey)	
Reading Greyfriars, earlier site		Franciscan Friars Minor, Conventual (under the Custody of Oxford) founded 1233 by permission of Adam de Lathbury, abbot of Reading, and the abbey's convent; transferred to new site 1285-6 (see immediately below)	
Reading Greyfriars ^{+}		Franciscan Friars Minor, Conventual (under the Custody of Oxford) transferred from former site (see immediately above) 1285-6 with permission of the abbot of Reading; church built 1311; dissolved 15 September 1538; used as hospital, a poorhouse then a town jail; converted back to a parish church	Saint Francis
Sandleford Priory ^		Augustinian Canons Regular founded 1193/1202 by Jeffrey (Geoffrey), Earl of Perch and his wife Maud (Matilda); arrangements made 1274 by Maud de Clare, Countess of Gloucester and Hertford (1223–1289) to refound as a double house for Fontevrault Benedictine nuns and brothers, but this did not come about; dissolved 1478 remains converted to a country house (see also Sandleford); now an Anglican convent school	The Priory Church of Saint John the Baptist, Sandleford
Shalford Preceptory		Knights Templar founded c.1198, apparently granted by Simon de Ovile; Knights Hospitaller dissolved after 1276; by 1338 had become a member of Greenham	Brimpton Commandery; Brimpton Preceptory
Sheffield Lesser Priory ^{~}		Benedictine monks alien house: manor-grange dependent on St Martin-de-Noyon, Charleval; founded after 1086, manor granted to Charleval by the Count of Evreux; locally known as a 'priory' dissolved and privately leased c.1166-7; passed to Reading 1270	
Sonning Minster		Saxon minster held by Bishop of Ramsbury/Sherborne 10th/11th century sometimes considered joint see with Ramsbury, Wiltshire; current parochial church dating to 9th century, largely rebuilt 1852–3; restored 1870–90	Hundredal Minster
Stratfield Saye Priory		Benedictine monks alien house: priory cell dependent on Valmont founded 1169 or 1170 by Nicholas de Stoteville (Nicholas d'Estouteville): hermitage granted to Valmont; dissolved 1399; house named 'The Priory' built on site (Beech Hill in the Berkshire part of Stratfield Saye)	St Leonard ____________________; Stratfield-Say Priory
Templeton Camera		Knights Templar possible small hospice or hostel with chapel; passed to Knights Hospitallers in 1311; in private hands at Dissolution; mansion named 'Templeton House' built on site 1895	

Return to top of page

=== Bristol ===
(For references and location detail see List of monastic houses in Bristol)

Foundation	Image	Communities and provenance	Formal name or dedication and alternative names
Bedminster Monastery		possible Saxon monastic or secular foundation parochial church of St John probably built on site, rebuilt 1854, destroyed by bombing in World War II	
Bristol Austin Friars ^{#}		Augustinian Friars (under the Limit of Oxford) founded 1313 by Sir Simon and Sir William Montacute; vacation house for alien students 1362; dissolved September 1538; granted to Maurice Dennis c.1543	
Bristol Blackfriars ^		Dominican Friars (under the Visitation of London) founded 1227/8 by Sir Maurice [de] Gaunt; dissolved 10 September 1528 (1538?); granted to William Chester; subsequently The Friars Quaker meeting house; then Bristol Register Office; currently in use as a restaurant	
Bristol Eremites Friars ^{#}		Friars Eremites	
Bristol Friars of the Sack ^{#}		Friars of the Sack founded before 1266; dissolved after 1286; friars had left before 1322, though church continued in use	
Bristol Greyfriars ^{#}		Franciscan Friars Minor, Conventual (under the Custody of Bristol) founded before 1230/34; dissolved 10 September 1538; granted to Mayor and citizens of Bristol c.1541	Saint Francis
Bristol Whitefriars ^{#}		Carmelite Friars founded 1256/1267 by Edward, Prince of Wales (the future Edward I); dissolved 1538; site successively occupied by a mansion and a boys' school; site now occupied by Colston Hall	The Blessed Virgin Mary
St James's Priory, Bristol ^{+}		Benedictine monks founded 1120s, built by Robert, Earl of Gloucester, son of Henry I; dissolved 1539; granted to Henry Brayne c.1543; nave in parochial use 1374; fell into disuse 1980s; in custodianship of the Little Brothers of Nazareth since 1996	The Priory Church of Saint James, Bristol
Bristol — St Mary Magdalen Nunnery ^{#}		Augustinian Canonesses founded 1173 by Eva, widow of Robert Fitzharding; also given as Benedictine dissolved 1536; granted to Henry Brayne and John Marsh; King David Inn built on site	St Mary Magdalene
Bristol — St Philip's Priory		Benedictine monks founded c.900	The Church of Saint Philip and Saint Jacob, Bristol
Bristol — St Stephen's Priory		Benedictine monks recorded as a cell dependent on Glastonbury Abbey, Somerset	
Bristol Cathedral Abbey: St Augustine's Abbey, Bristol ^{+}		Augustinian Canons Regular — Victorine founded 1140-2 by Robert Fitzharding; first canons transferred from Shobdon Priory, Herefordshire (1120 or) 1148; dissolved 9 December 1539; episcopal diocesan cathedral founded 1542; extant	The Abbey Church of Saint Augustine of Canterbury, Bristol The Cathedral Church of the Holy and Undivided Trinity, Bristol
Bristol Preceptory		Knights Templar church built on site of templar church, now in ruins	
Westbury Priory		Saxon minster, college of secular priests founded 716; granted to Worcester Cathedral 824; probably destroyed in Danish raids 9th century; Benedictine monks refounded c.963–964 by Bishop Oswald; 12 monks transferred to new site at Ramsey Abbey, Huntingdonshire 972; priory lapsed thereafter; refounded c.1093, cell dependent on Worcester; lapsed before c.1112; refounded 1125; college of secular priests 1194; parochial church built on site	The Priory Church of the Blessed Virgin Mary, Westbury on Trym ____________________; Westbury on Trym Priory; Westbury Minster

Return to top of page

=== Buckinghamshire ===
(For references and location detail see List of monastic houses in Buckinghamshire)

Foundation	Image	Communities & provenance	Formal name or dedication & alternative names
Aylesbury Greyfriars^{#}		Franciscan Friars Minor, Conventual (under the Custody of Oxford) founded 1387 by James Butler, Earl of Ormond; dissolved 1 October 1538	
Aylesbury Monastery^{#}		possible nuns order and period unknown said to have been a nunnery or Trinitarian house — probably only a holding	
Biddlesden Abbey^{#}		Cistercian monks — from Garendon, Leicestershire founded 10 July 1147 by Ernald de Bosco, seneschal of the Earl of Leicester; dissolved 29 September 1538; granted to Thomas Wriothesley 1540/1; remains demolished c.1727; site now occupied by private house named 'Biddlesden Park'	Saint Mary ____________________; Biddlesdon Abbey; Bittlesden Abbey
Bradwell Priory		Benedictine monks cell, dependent on Luffield; founded before 1136-44 (before/c.1155) by Meinfelin, Lord of Wolverton; dissolved 1524-5 (or 1526) by Cardinal Thomas Wolsey for Christ Church, Oxford; granted to Arthur Longfield 1542/3; now in private ownership; currently an urban studies centre	Saint Mary ____________________; Bradewell Priory
Bulstrode Preceptory ^{$}		Knights Templar founded before 1276; dissolved 1308–1312; land passed to and leased on behalf of the Knights Hospitaller, though they had no commandery here; site identified through earthworks	
Burnham Abbey *		Augustinian canonesses founded 1265/66 by Richard, King of the Romans; dissolved 19 September 1539; granted to William Tyldesly 1544/5; Anglican Augustinian Society of the Precious Blood transferred from Birmingham 1916; extant	Saint Mary
Chetwode Priory ^{+}		Augustinian Canons Regular founded 1244 or 1245 by Ralph de Norwich; dissolved, being reduced to the status of a cell, annexed to Notley 1460–1; dissolved 1535; priory church became parochial c.1480 as the Parish Church of St Mary and St Nicholas	Saint Mary and Saint Nicholas ____________________; Chetwode Cell
Crawley Monastery		founded before 1042; (ref. as monasterium 1086)	St Firmin ____________________; North Crawley Monastery
Gare Nunnery		Benedictine nuns founded 1163 in Stoke Goldington by Robert de Salcey, Peter de Goldington and Richard de Besseville; granted to Delapré, Northamptonshire, late 12th/early 13th centuries; apparently reduced to status of a grange by 1438; subsequently recorded as destroyed	Gore Nunnery; Gorefields Nunnery; Prioratus Gore, Sanctae Mariae Magdalenae, Moniales Nigrae
Hogshaw Nunnery ^{#}		St John of Jerusalem nuns cell foundation unknown transferred to Sisters of St John Priory, Buckland, Somerset c.1180; site occupied by Knights Hospitaller commandery (see immediately below)	
Hogshaw Commandery ^{#}		Knights Hospitaller founded c.1180 on site of earlier nunnery (see immediately above), granted by William Peverel; dissolved 1470 becoming prior's possession; granted to Matilda Lane c.1543; church in use until 1650; ruined by 1700	
Lavendon Abbey ^{$}		Premonstratensian Canons founded c.1154/5-1158 by John de Bidun, sheriff of Buckinghamshire; dissolved 1536; granted to Sir Edmund Peckham 1543; site now occupied by house named 'Lavendon Grange' (once the home of relatives of Sir Isaac Newton)	The Abbey Church of Saint John the Baptist, Lavendon ____________________; Lavinden Abbey
Little Marlow Priory		Benedictine nuns founded c.1195 or before 1218 (or 1244 by Jeffrey, Lord Spensar); dissolved in, or before 1536; granted to John Tiltey and E. Restwold 1540	Saint Mary ____________________; Little Merlow Priory; Minchin Marlow Priory
Luffield Priory		Benedictine monks founded after 1118 (c.1123 or 1124, or 1133) by Robert II le Bossu, Earl of Leicester; suppression authorised by the Pope 1494; dissolution stayed until 1504, after the death of the serving prior	The Blessed Virgin Mary
Medmenham Abbey		Cistercian monks — from Woburn, Bedfordshire founded 1201/4, or in 1202 by Hugh de Bolbec; house built 1213; dissolved before 8 July 1536 (delayed from 1524); granted to Robert Mone and others 1547; converted into a manor house	The Abbey Church of the Blessed Virgin Mary, Medmenham ____________________; Mendham Abbey
Missenden Abbey ^		Augustinian/Arroasian Canons alien house: daughter house of St Mary de Bosco, or de Nemore, Ruisseauville, France; founded 1133 by William de Missenden; the house acknowledged royal supremacy 1536; dissolved 1538; granted to the Duke of Northumberland; now a residential college rarely open to general public	The Abbey Church of Saint Mary the Virgin, Great Missenden ____________________; Great Missenden Abbey
Newton Longville Priory		Cluniac monks alien house: daughter house of Longville Ste Foi Abbey founded c.1150 or before 1102 by Walter Giffard, Earl of Buckingham; dissolved 1414; granted to New College, Oxford 1441; Manor House purportedly built on site 1550; St Faith's Church incorporates 12th-century church remains, possibly originally part of the priory church and may have been the conventual church of the priory	St Faith ____________________; Newington-Longaville Priory; Newton-Longville Cell
Notley Abbey ^		Augustinian Canons Regular founded before 1162 by Walter Giffard, Earl of Buckingham, and Lady Ermgard; dissolved 9 December 1538; granted to Sir William Paget 1547; site now occupied by a private house without public access	The Abbey Church of the Blessed Virgin and Saint John the Baptist, Notley ____________________ abbey de parco Crendon; Crendon Parc Abbey abbey de parco super Thamam; Nuctele Abbey; Noctele Abbey; Nuttley Abbey; Nutley Abbey
Ravenstone Priory		Augustinian Canons Regular founded 1255 by Peter de Chaseport (Chaceport), Keeper of the Royal Wardrobe; dissolved 1525 (or 1544); granted to Sir Francis Byran 1548; site now occupied by 19th century 'Abbey Farm'	The Priory Church of St Mary ____________________; Ravinston Priory
Risborough Priory (?)		Benedictine monks — doubtful establishment; reputedly pre-Conquest cell of Canterbury Cathedral	Monks Risborough Priory
Snelshall Priory ^{$}		Premonstratensian Canons cell, dependent on Lavendon; founded before 1166, granted to Lavendon by Sybil de Aungervill (Dangerville); abandoned after 1203-4; Benedictine monks founded 1203/4-1219 by Ralph Mortel (grandson of Sybil de Aungervill); dissolved 1535; granted to Francis Piggot 1538; site currently comprises earthworks	St Leonard ____________________; Snellshall Priory
Tickford Priory		Benedictine-Cluniac monks alien house: cell of Marmoutier founded 1140 or c.1100 by Fulk Paynell; dissolved 1524; sold to Henry Atkins, MD by James I	Blessed Virgin Mary ____________________; Newport Pagnel Priory; Tyxford Priory
Widmere Commandery		Knights Hospitaller founded before 1248; dissolved before 1338	Widmere Camera; Widmere Preceptory
Wing Priory ^{#}		Saxon monastery 7th century Benedictine monks alien house: cell, dependent on St Nicholas, Angers founded before 1086; granted by Empress Matilda to Angers; land and later, chapel, granted to Angers by Bodin de Ver; in ownership of the Crown 1342-1361 and 1393–1423; dissolved 1416; granted to St Mary de Pré, Hertfordshire by St Albans, Hertfordshire; granted to Sir Robert Dormer by King Henry VIII	Wenge Priory

The following location in Buckinghamshire lacks known monastic connection:

- Wycombe Abbey: Independent girls' school

Return to top of page

=== Cambridgeshire ===
(For references and location detail see List of monastic houses in Cambridgeshire)

Foundation	Image	Communities and provenance	Formal name or dedication and alternative names
Anglesey Priory ^, Lode, Cambridgeshire		Augustinian Canons Regular founded 1135 by Henry I; initially established as a hospital; apparently becoming a priory c.1212 when endowed by Richard de Clare, Earl of Gloucester; dissolved before 7 August 1536; granted to John Hynde c.1538; remains incorporated into private house named 'Anglesey Abbey' 1591; (National Trust)	The Priory Church of the Blessed Virgin Mary and Saint Nicholas, Anglesey
Barham Friary		Crutched Friars founded before 1272 (or c.1293) apparently from Welnetham, Suffolk; later dependent on London; dissolved 1538; granted to Philip Paris c.1539, and later to John Millecent, Esq. chapel remained in use until house named 'Barham Hall' built on site 1830	St Margaret ____________________; Barkham Priory; Bercham Priory
Barnwell Priory, Cambridge		Augustinian Canons Regular transferred from St Giles, Castle Hill, Lode; refounded c.1112 by Pain Peverel; plundered by townsmen 1381 dissolved 11 November 1538; granted to Anthony Brown c.1546; granted to Edward, Lord Clinton c.1552; ruins thoroughly destroyed 1810	St Giles and St Andrew
Cambridge Austin Friars		Augustinian Friars (under the Limit of Cambridge) founded before 1289; transferred to new site (see immediately below) 1290	
Cambridge Austin Friars		Augustinian Friars (under the Limit of Cambridge) transferred from earlier site (see above) 1290 by Geoffrey de Picheford	
Cambridge Augustinian Priory, Castle Hill, Lode		Augustinian Canons Regular founded c.1092 by Picot, Lord of Bourn, Sheriff of Cambridgeshire, and Hugolina, his wife; transferred to new site at Barnwell Priory c.1112	St Giles
Cambridge, Bethlehemite Friary (?)		Bethlehemite Friars documented 1257 — probably never established	
Cambridge Blackfriars		Dominican Friars (under the Visitation of Cambridge) founded before 1238 (or 1237-42/c.1258); dissolved 1538; granted to Edward Erlington and Humphrey Metcalf c.1543; Emmanuel College built on site 1584 (see Cambridge University)	
Blackfriars, Cambridge *		Dominican Friars founded 1938; extant	The Priory of Saint Michael the Archangel, Cambridge
Cambridge, Buckingham College Priory		Benedictine monks dependent on Crowland, Lincolnshire; transferred from Ely Hostel 1428; dissolved c.1540; refounded 1542 as the College of St Mary Magdalene	Monk's College
Cambridge, Ely Hostel Priory		Benedictine monks dependent on Ely & others; founded 1321 for brothers studying at Ely; transferred to new site at Spaldyngs Inn (see immediately below)	
Cambridge, Border Hostel Priory		Benedictine monks dependent on Ely & others; transferred from Ely Hostel (see immediately above) 1350 to Spaldyngs Inn (later renamed Border Hostel); transferred to new site at Cambridge, Buckingham College 1428	
Cambridge Greyfriars		Franciscan Friars Minor, Conventual (under the Custody of Cambridge) founded c.1226, "by the bounty of Edward I", on the site of an old synagogue loaned to the Franciscans and adjoining land; rebuilt before 1330; dissolved 1538 (the friars departed prior to the enforcement); sold to the executors of Lady Frances Sidney 1544/5; granted to Trinity College, Cambridge 1546; Sidney Sussex College, Cambridge founded on site 1595	
Cambridge Pied Friars		Pied Friars founded 1256(?) when some friars appear to have remained in the move of the Carmelites from Chesterton to Newnham; transferred to new site (see immediately below) 1273	
Cambridge Pied Friars		Pied Friars (community founded at earlier site (see immediately above) 1256(?)); transferred here between 1273 and 1279 on land bought 1273 by the proctor of the Order of Blessed Mary in England; dissolved after 1319	
Cambridge White Friars		Carmelite Friars (community founded at Chesterton 1247 (or 1249)); transferred here 1249 via Newnham; dissolved 1538; granted to John Eyer c.1544	
Cambridge — Friars of the Sack		Friars of the Sack founded 1258 at the house of John le Rus, mayor of Cambridge, from funding by Edward I; intended by the Pope to be passed to the Gilbertines 1290, but plan abandoned because the friars were still in residence; granted to Peterhouse 1307; site now occupied by Fitzwilliam Museum	
Cambridge — St Mary's Friars		Friars of St Mary founded c.1279 dissolved after 1319	
Cambridge — St Edmund's Priory		Gilbertine Canons founded before 1291, St Edmund's chapel granted by 'the bounty or gift of' B_ son of Walter; originally intended by the Pope to be located at the friary of the Sack, but it was still occupied; dissolved 1539; granted to Edward Ebrington (Erlington?) and Humphrey Metcalf c.1543	The Priory Church of Saint Edmund, Cambridge
Cambridge — St Radegund's Priory		Benedictine nuns cell founded c.1133-8 by John de Cranden, Prior of Ely with endowment confirmed by Stephen; destroye' 1313, 1376 and 1389; dissolved 1496 for the founded of Jesus College, Cambridge, which currently occupies the site	The Priory Church of the Blessed Virgin Mary and Saint Radegund
Chatteris Abbey		Benedictine nuns founded 1006-16 by Ednoth, Bishop of Dorchester with his sister Aelfwen (or 980 by Alfwen, wife of Ethelstan, Earl of the East Angles); destroyed 1306-10; dissolved 3 September 1538; granted to Edward, Lord Clinton c.1551	The Abbey Church of the Blessed Virgin Mary, Chatteris ____________________; Chateris Abbey
Chesterton Whitefriars		Carmelite Friars founded 1247 (or 1249) by Edward I and other nobles; transferred to new site at Newnham 1249 (or 1251-6)	
Cherry Hinton		Bridgettine monks and nuns charter for founded 1406 — house never established	
Chippenham Preceptory		Knights Hospitaller — under Clerkenwell, Middlesex founded 1184 by William de Mandeville, Earl of Essex; apparently annexed to Carbrook before 1489; dissolved 1535; granted to Sir Edward North 1540/1	
Denny Abbey		Benedictine monks cell dependent on Ely; founded 1159 by Robert, Chamberlain of Conan IV, Duke of Brittany; Knights Templar preceptory founded 1169; became hospital-preceptory c.1170; dissolved 1308; committed to Master Roger of Wingfield 3 June 1309; Franciscan nuns refounded 1423 by Mary de St Pol, Countess of Pembroke (Mary de St Paulo, widow of Adomare, Earl of Pembroke) on the site of a cell of Ely; dissolved before 28 October 1539; granted to Edward Erlington 1540, though nuns apparently continued to be in occupation to 1547; estate exchanged for other land owned by the King; in Crown ownership; passed to City of London 1628 to offset the debts of the King; converted to farmhouse 18th century; many changes of hands 17th-19th century; estate bought by Pembroke College and vested it into the care of the Ministry of Works 1947; part of the Farmland Museum since 1997; (EH)	The Abbey Church of Saint James and Saint Leonard, Denny (1159-69); The Nunnery of the Blessed Virgin Mary and Saint Clare (1342-1539); ____________________; Denney Abbey; Denney Preceptory
Duxford Preceptory		Knights Templar founded 1273; committed to Master Roger of Wingfield 3 June 1309; passed to Knights Hospitaller by John le Clerk of Wilbraham 21 December 1313, though no preceptory or camera was maintained there; sacked 15 June 1381 during the Peasants' Revolt; 16th century Temple Farm on site	Duxford Temple
Eltisley Priory		Benedictine nuns founded 9th century(?); apparently destroyed in raids by the Danes c.870; Benedictine nuns founded before 1066; dissolved before 1087	
Ely Cathedral Priory ^{+}		?nuns (/and monks? — double monastery?) founded c.673; destroyed by the Danes 870; secular canons refounded 9th century; Benedictine monks founded 970; dissolved 1539; episcopal diocesan cathedral founded 1109; extant	The Abbey Church of Saint Peter and Saint Etheldreda The Cathedral Church of the Holy and Undivided Trinity and Saint Etheldreda
Fordham Priory ^{#}		Gilbertine Canons founded before 1227, built by Henry, Dean of Fordham with endowments by Hugh Malebisse; dissolved 1 September 1538; granted to Philip Parry 1540/1; site now occupied by private house named 'Fordham Abbey'	The Priory Church of Saint Peter and Saint Mary Magdalene, Fordham
Great Wilbraham Preceptory		Knights Templar founded 1170; dissolved 1308-12; Knights Hospitaller founded 1312; dissolved c.1350 house named 'Wilbraham Temple' built on or near preceptory site 17th century	Wilbraham Temple
Hinchingbrook Priory		Benedictine nuns founded before 1087 purportedly by William the Conqueror to replace Eltisely; dissolved 1536; granted to Richard Williams (alias Cromwell) 1537/8; remains incorporated into 16th century Hinchingbrooke House built on site	The Priory Church of Saint James, Hinchinbrook The Priory of Saint James without Huntingdon
Horningsea Monastery		early Saxon monastery destroyed in raids by the Danes 870	Biggin Abbey
Holme Friary		unknown order documented 1260	
Huntingdon Austin Friars ^{#}		Augustinian Friars (under the Limit of Cambridge) founded August 1258; destroyed 1286; rebuilt dissolved 1539; Cromwell House built on site: birthplace of Oliver Cromwell	St Mary
Huntingdon Priory, earlier site		Benedictine monks dependent on Thorney; founded before 973 by King Edgar; dissolved before 1086; transferred to new site out of the town (see immediately below); church granted to that new priory	
Huntingdon Priory		Benedictine monks transferred from earlier site (see immediately above); Augustinian Canons Regular 1086-91; possible secular college 1087-1106; Augustinian Canons Regular refounded c.1108(?); dissolved 11 July 1538	St Mary
Ickleton Priory ^{#}		Benedictine nuns founded 1190 by Aubrey de Vere, Earl of Oxford (or by a member of the Valoignes family); dissolved 1536; granted to Thomas Goodrich, Bishop of Ely 1538/9 now on site of Abbey Farm	The Priory Church of Saint Mary Magdalene, Ickleton ____________________; Ikelington Priory
Isleham Priory		Benedictine monks alien house: daughter of St-Jacut-de-Mer; founded 1086 (or c.1100); monks moved 1254 to sister cell at Linton; dissolved 1414; granted to Pembroke College, Cambridge which converted the church into a barn and demolished the monastery; (EH)	The Priory Church of Saint Margaret of Antioch, Isleham ____________________; Isleham Cell
Linton Priory		Benedictine monks alien house: daughter of St-Jacut-de-Mer: granted before 1163 "by gift of an ancestor of Alan, son of Ferlant"; monks transferred from Isleham, 1254; granted to Pembroke Hall, Cambridge; conventual until 1414; restored late-19th century	St Mary the Virgin
Marmont Priory		Gilbertine Canons founded before 1204 (before c.1203) by Ralph de Hauvill; referred to as a cell of Watton 1535; dissolved 1538; granted to Percival Bowes and John Mosyer 1567/8;	The Priory Church of the Blessed Virgin Mary, Marmont ____________________; Mirmaud Priory; Marmonde Priory; Welle Priory; Welles Priory; Upwell Priory
Newnham Whitefriars		Carmelite Friars (community founded at Chesterton 1247 (1249)); transferred 1249 (or 1251-6) from Chesterton; site granted by Michael Malherb; occupied until c.1292; transferred to new site in Milne Street, Cambridge	
Oxney Priory		Benedictine monks priory cell dependent on Peterborough; founded before 1272; dissolved 1538	St Mary
Peterborough Abbey ^{+}		Saxon monastery founded c.655, built by Saxulf, a monk, and Peada, King of Mercia and his brother Wulfhere; monks 655-6; Benedictine? monks refounded? c.673 destroyed in raids by the Danes 870, derelict to c.966; Benedictine monks refounded c.966; rebuilt 966-72 by Ethelwold, Bishop of Winchester with King Edgar and St Dunstan dissolved 29 November 1539; episcopal diocesan cathedral founded 1540; extant	The Cathedral Church of Saint Peter, Saint Paul and Saint Andrew, Peterborough ____________________; Medeshamstede Abbey; Peterburgh Abbey
Ramsey Abbey		Benedictine monks founded 969, site offered by Aethelwine to St Oswald, Bishop of Worcester; dissolved 22 November 1539; church modified and incorporated into mansion named 'Ramsey House' built c.1600; in use as a comprehensive school from mid-1980s; (NT)	The Abbey Church of Saint Mary and Saint Benedict, Ramsey
St Ives Priory		Benedictine monks priory cell dependent on Ramsey church dedicated by Bishop Siward dissolved 1539; house built on site	St Ive
St Neots Priory		Benedictine monks cell dependent on Ely; founded 974 by Earl Alric and his wife Ethelfleda; cell of Bec-Hellouin 1113; new church dedicated 1113; independent 1412; dissolved 1539; site currently occupied by Market Place car park	The Priory Church of St Neot, St Neots ____________________; Eynesbury Priory
Sawtry Abbey		Cistercian monks — from Warden, Bedfordshire; founded 1147 by Simon de Senlis, Earl of Huntingdon and Northampton; dissolved 1536-37	The Blessed Virgin Mary ____________________; Sawtrey Abbey
Shingay Preceptory		Knights Hospitaller founded 1144-62 Walter, first prior of the Hospitallers in England on land purportedly granted by Sibylla de Raynes (daughter of the Earl of Montgomery) and the Earl of Gloucester; Sisters of St. John nuns' cell removed to Sisters of St John Priory, Buckland, Somerset c.1180; dissolved; granted to Richard Longe 1540/1	Shengay Preceptory
Soham Monastery		Saxon monks founded c.630 or 631 by St. Felix, first bishop of the East Saxons (who is purported to have had his see here); destroyed in raids by the Danes 870 or 871; parish church of St Andrew purportedly occupies the site	Seham Monastery
Spinney Abbey		Augustinian Canons Regular founded between 1216 and 1228 by Hugh de Malebisse and Beatrix his wife; dependent on Ely 1449; Benedictine monks 1449; dissolved 1538; granted to Sir Edward North 1544/5; site now occupied by a house and farm	Priory of St Mary and the Holy Cross, Spinney ____________________; Spinney Priory
Stamford — St Michael's Priory		Benedictine nuns dependent on Peterborough founded c.1155 by William of Waterville, Abbot of Peterborough; with regular priests or brethren until after 1323; appears to have claimed itself to be Cistercian before 1268; dissolved 1536	St Mary and St Michael ____________________; Stamford Baron Priory; Stamford St Michael's Priory
Stamford St Sepulchre Priory		Augustinian Canons Regular — Holy Sepulchre founded c.1170(?) until before 1189; Augustinian Canons Regular under patronage of Peterborough from before 1189; hospital founded, continuing until after 1227	
Stonely Priory ^{$}		possibly initially a hospital Augustinian Canons Regular founded c.1180 by William de Mandeville (according to Leland, but more likely William, Earl of Essex, possibly hospital until after 1220; dissolved 1536; leased to Oliver Leder of Great Staughton in 1538; granted to him and his wife Frances 1544	The Priory Church of the Blessed Virgin Mary, Stonely
Swaffham Bulbeck Priory		Benedictine nuns founded c.1150-63 by Isabel the Bolebec; dissolved 1536; granted to the Thomas Goodrich, Bishop of Ely 1538/9	The Nunnery of Saint Mary, Swaffham ____________________; Swaffham Nunnery; Swafam Nunnery
Swavesey Priory		Benedictine monks alien house: dependent on St Serge Abbey, Angers: granted by Count Alan Rufus; founded before 1086; granted to the Carthusians of Coventry 1411; a private residence named 'The Priory' is supposedly situated on or near the site	St Andrew
Thirling Cell		Augustinian Canons Regular — grange or cell	Thirling Priory
Thorney Abbey ^{+}		anchorites or hermits before 972; Benedictine monks founded 972 by the first abbot of Peterborough; dissolved 1539; granted to John, Earl of Bedford 1549/50; church now in parochial use	The Priory Church of Saint Mary and Saint Botulph, Thorney
Trokenholt Priory		hermitage Benedictine monks cell dependent on Thorney; founded 1154-69 (during the reign of Henry II): hermitage and chapel granted to Thorney by Nigel, Bishop of Ely; dissolved 14th century(?)	
Waterbeach Abbey		Franciscan nuns founded 1294 by Denise Munchensey; gradually removed to Denny 1351 due to flooding; dissolved 1351	The Nunnery of the Piety of Our Lady and Saint Clare The Nunnery of Our Lady of Pity and Saint Clare
Whittlesey Mere Friary		hermit friars; apparently not Austin friars; uncertain order and foundation, no further reference	
Wittering Priory		order and foundation unknown — priory recorded extant 1308; reference to documentary evidence of its existence 1273 possibly refers to Southorpe Hospital	

The following locations in Cambridgeshire lack known monastic connections:

- Barnwell Priory Abbey: (The Church of Saint Andrew-the-Less, Barnwell), built adjacent to former Priory Church, called 'The Abbey Church'
- Buckden Abbey: Elizabethan mansion

Return to top of page

=== Cheshire ===
(For references and location detail see List of monastic houses in Cheshire)

Foundation	Image	Communities & provenance	Formal name or dedication & alternative names
Barrow Camera (?)		Knights Hospitaller church granted by Robert de Bachepuz; considered to be a confusion with Barrow Camera in Derbyshire	Great Barrow Camera
Birkenhead Priory	Historical county location. See entry under Merseyside		
Bromborough Priory	Historical county location. See entry under Merseyside		
Chester Abbey ^{+}		tradition of very early foundation disputed ?nuns founded before 875; destroyed? in raids by the Danes 875; secular canons founded after 907, traditionally by Æthelflæd, daughter of King Alfred; Benedictine monks refounded as an abbey 1092/3 by Hugh I, Earl of Chester; dissolved 1540; granted 1534/5; episcopal diocesan cathedral founded 1541; extant	The Abbey Church of Saint Peter and Saint Paul, Chester (-875) The Abbey Church of Saint Werburgh, Chester The Cathedral Church of Christ and the Blessed Virgin Mary, Chester (1541)
Chester Abbey		secular canons? founded 689; destroyed? in raids by the Danes after 875; secular canons with associated anchorite cell; (?re)founded c.906-7?; part of the college of St John the Baptist; dissolved 1547; briefly episcopal diocesan cathedral, then co-cathedral with Coventry ?1072/5 until 1102; in parochial use from 1102	The Abbey Church of Saint John the Baptist, Chester The Cathedral Church of Saint John the Baptist, Chester (1072/5-1102)
Chester Blackfriars		Dominican Friars (under the Visitation of Oxford) founded before 1236 by Alexander Stavensby, Bishop of Coventry and Lichfield; dissolved 1538; granted to John Coke of London February 1544; site came into the possession of the Dutton family 1561	
Chester Franciscan Friary, earlier site		Capuchin Franciscan Friars — from Pantasaph, Wales founded 21 December 1858 transferred to new site 1862 (see immediately below)	
Chester Franciscan Friary *		Capuchin Franciscan Friars — from Pantasaph, Wales founded 21 December 1858 at earlier site (see immediately above) transferred to new site 1862; church opened 29 April 1875; extant	St Francis
Chester Greyfriars		Franciscan Friars Minor, Conventual (under the Custody of Worcester) founded 1237/8 (1238–40) by Albert of Pisa; dissolved 1537 (15 August 1538); granted to John Coke	
Chester Friars of the Sack		Friars of the Sack founded before 1274; dissolved 1284; community probably died out before 1300	
Chester — St Michael's Monastery		uncertain order founded before 1162; Parish Church of St Michael, built 15th century; rebuilt by James Harrison 1849–50, currently in use as a Heritage Centre	St Michael
Chester Whitefriars		Carmelite Friars founded 1279 (or before 1277) by Thomas Stadham; precinct granted 1289 to build their house; dissolved 15 August 1538; granted to John Coke (Cokkes)	
Chester Priory, earlier site		Benedictine? nuns founded before 1066; dissolved before c.1140; refounded on new site (see immediately below)	St Mary
Chester Priory ^{#}		Benedictine nuns (community founded at earlier site (see immediately above) before 1066); transferred here refounded c.1140 by Ranulph de Gernon (Randal), Earl of Chester; dissolved 1537 (c.1540(?)); granted to Urian Brereton and son; site excavated prior to construction of County Police Headquarters on site 1964	The Priory Church of Saint Mary, Chester
Combermere Abbey		Savignac monks — from Savigny founded 3 November 1133 by Hugh de Malbane, Lord of Nantwich; Cistercian monks orders merged 17 September 1147; dissolved 1538; granted to William Cotton, Esq.	The Abbey Church of Saint Mary and Saint Michael, Combermere
Curzon Park Abbey *, Chester		Benedictine nuns (community founded at Talacre, Wales, 1868); transferred from Talacre 1988; extant	The Abbey Church of Our Lady Help of Christians, Curzon Park, Chester
Darnhall Abbey		Cistercian monks — from Abbey Dore, Herefordshire founded 14 January 1271 to February 1274 by Edward I; transferred to new site at Vale Royal 1281	The Abbey Church of Saint Mary, Darnhall
Hilbre Island	Historical county location. See entry under Merseyside		
Mobberley Priory ^{#}		Augustinian Canons Regular founded c.1203-4 (c.1206) by Patrick of Mobberley; annexed as a cell dependent on Rocester, Staffordshire 1228–40; manor house built on site 1625 (replacing earlier, ruinous house)	The Priory Church of Saint Mary and Saint Wilfrid, Mobberley ____________________; Modberley Priory
Norton Priory		Augustinian Canons Regular (community founded at Runcorn c.1115); transferred from Runcorn 1134 by William FitzWilliam third Baron of Halton; raised to abbey status 1391 (1422) (early in the reign of Henry VI or sooner); dissolved 1536; granted to Richard Brooke; part converted into private mansion 1545; demolished 1928; now in ownership of Norton Priory Museum Trust open to public as a museum	The Priory Church of Saint Mary at Norton ____________________; Norton Abbey
Poulton Abbey		Savignac monks — from Combermere site granted to Combermere 1146; Cistercian monks orders merged 17 September 1147; founded 1153 by Robert, butler to Ranulf II, Earl of Chester; building possibly completed 12 May 1158; transferred to new site at Dieulacres, Staffordshire 1214 due to incursions by the Welsh; subsequently re-used as a monastic grange with chapel; dissolved; granted to William Cotton, Esq. (Sir George Cotton) c.1544; ruinous before 1672; demolished before 1718	St Mary and St Benedict ____________________; Pulton Priory; Pulton Abbey
Runcorn Priory		supposed monastic house founded c.912 by Æthelflaed of Mercia; Augustinian Canons Regular founded 1115 by William FitzNigel second Baron of Halton; transferred to new site at Norton 1134; possibly on site now occupied by All Saints parish church	St Mary and St Bertelin
Saighton Grange		Benedictine monks mainly agricultural grange converted to residential grange of the abbots of Chester 15th century; monastic site, apart from gatehouse, demolished 1861; house built on site; converted into a school named 'Abbey Gate College' 1977	
Stanlow Abbey		Cistercian monks — from Combermere; founded 11 November 1172 by John FitzRichard, Constable and sixth Baron of Halton; transferred to new site at Whalley, Lancashire 1296; retained in use as a cell/grange dependent on Whalley from c.1350(?) until 1442; dissolved 1442?; granted to Sir Robert Cotton, Kt. c.1553; no substantial remains, site inaccessible	The Blessed Virgin Mary ____________________; Locus Benedictus de Stanlawe; Stanlaw Abbey; Stanlawe Abbey
Stanney Grange		Cistercian monks grange with resident monk, dependent on Stanlow and Whalley, Lancashire; founded 1172	Cow Worth Grange
Vale Royal Abbey		Cistercian monks (community founded at Darnhall 14 January 1274 to 1277); transferred from Darnhall 1281; never completed; a project of Edward I; dissolved 1545; granted to Thomas Holcroft c.1543	Saint Mary the Virgin, Saint Nicholas and Saint Nicasius ____________________; Valeroyal Abbey
Warrington Austin Friars		Augustinian Friars (under the Limit of Lincoln) founded before 1272? (built 1379?) on the site of an earlier hospital; dissolved 1539; granted to Thomas Holcroft 1540/1; church continued in use until 17th century	
Warburton Priory	Historical county location. See entry under Greater Manchester		

Return to top of page

=== Cornwall ===
(For references and location detail see List of monastic houses in Cornwall)

Foundation	Image	Communities and provenance	Formal name or dedication & alternative names
Altarnon Monastery		probable monastery before 1066	Altarnun Monastery
Bodmin — Abbey of St Mary & St Petroc^{*}		Augustinian Canons Regular (Canons Regular of the Lateran) founded 1881; raised to abbey status 1953	
Bodmin Blackfriars		probable mistaken reference to Bodmin Greyfriars	
Bodmin Greyfriars ^{#}		Franciscan Friars Minor, Conventual (under the Custody of Bristol) founded before 1260; dissolved 1538	Bodmin Greyfriars
Bodmin Priory ^{+}		Celtic monks abbey? purportedly founded 6th century by St Petroc; Benedictine? monks refounded 936; nuns? dissolved c.1113; monks or secular dissolved c.1124; Augustinian Canons Regular founded 1124; dissolved 27 February 1538; buildings destroyed apart from the parish church, in parochial use as Church of England parish church; church in use for secular and industrial purposes post-dissolution	Bodmin Monastery; Bodmin Abbey
Breage Grange		Cistercian monks grange dependent on Hailes, Gloucestershire; founded c.1300	
Cardinham Grange ^{#}		purported medieval monastery	
Constantyne Monastery		Celtic monks	
Crantock Monastery		Celtic monks probably founded by a St Carrock; secular before 1066; recorded extant 1086; secular canons collegiate refounded 1236; dissolved 1549	St Corontocus ____________________; St Karentoc's Monastery
Dingerein Monastery		Celtic monks	Dinurrin Monastery
Gulval Monastery		Celtic monks founded by St Gudwall (Wolvela), from Wales	Dinurrin Monastery
Kea Monastery, Old Kea		Celtic monks supposed site of monastery recorded extant 1086	St Cheus Monastery; Old Kea Monastery
Lammana Priory, Looe Island		Benedictine monks founded 6th century; Benedictine monks cell dependent on Glastonbury and chapel; founded before 1114; disposed of by Glastonbury between 1239 and 1329; chantry chapel of the Dawnay family before 1329; dissolved 1549	The Priory Church of St Michael, Lammana ____________________; Lammana Chapel
Lansallos Monastery		Celtic monks patronised by St Ildierna	St Salwys (St Alwys)
Lannachebran Cell, St Keverne		monks founded c.6th century under the tutelage of St Achebran; secular collegiate refounded before 1086; Cistercian monks grange dependent on Beaulieu, Hampshire; founded before 1263; dissolved 1527; granted to Francis, Earl of Bedford 1559/60	St Keiran's Monastery; St Keverne's Monastery; Lanachebran Monastery
Launcells Priory		Celtic monks secular at Norman Conquest; Augustinian Canons Regular	
Launceston Friary(?)		Friars	
Launceston Priory, earlier site		monks or secular founded before c.830; secular canons to c.1126	
Launceston Priory ^{+}		Augustinian Canons Regular founded 1127; dissolved 1539; restored 1871; in parochial use as the Church of St Thomas the Apostle	
Lanwethinoc Monastery^{~}, Padstow		Celtic monks founded by Bishop Wethinoc; site possibly occupied by the medieval Church of St Petroc at Padstow	Lanuthinoc Monastery; St Petroc's Church; Petroc-stow Monastery; Padstow Monastery
Madron Monastery		Celtic monks before 12th century	
Manaccan Monastery		Celtic monks	
Mawgan in Pydar Franciscan Monastery *		Franciscan monks	The Franciscan Monastery of St Joseph and St Anne, St Mawgan in Pydar
Minster Priory ^{+}		Celtic monks? founded before 1066; Benedictine monks alien house: daughter house of the Abbey of St. Sergius, Angers founded before 1190 by William de Bottreaux; dissolved before 1407; slight remains of priory near the medieval parochial church	The Priory Church of Saint Materiana, Minster St Mertherian ____________________; Talcarne Priory; Minster Cell
Paul Grange		Cistercian monks grange(?) dependent on Hailes, Gloucestershire; founded c.1300(?)	
Probus Monastery		Celtic monks or secular founded 924, purportedly by King Athelstan; dissolved 940; secular canons collegiate founded before 1086 (or during the reign of Henry I, who granted the church to Exeter Cathedral 1120); dissolved 1549	
Rialton Grange ^{#}		Augustinian Canons Regular chief manor or grange of Bodmin; manor house built 15th century	Rieltone Grange
St Anthony's Monastery, St Anthony-in-Meneage		Celtic monks Benedictine monks alien house: grange of St-Serge, Angers; founded from Brittany?; became parochial after 1066; became a grange of Tywardreath before mid-12th century (though referred to as a cell); founded after 1088; dissolved after 1381	Lantenning Monastery
St Anthony-in-Roseland Priory ^		Augustinian Canons Regular priory cell dependent on Plympton, Devon founded before 1288; dissolved 1538; remains incorporated into house named 'Place House' built on site 16th Century	St Anthony-in-Roseland Cell
St Buryan's Monastery, St Buryan		Celtic monks secular collegiate founded c.930, purportedly by King Athelstan; dissolved 1545; parish church (SS Andrew, Thomas the Martyr, Nicholas and Beriana) on site rebuilt 13th century, though mostly now 15th century	
St Carrok's Monastery ^{#}, St Winnow		Celtic monks dissolved/destroyed before 1086?: seized by Robert, Count of Mortain; Cluniac monks alien house: cell dependent on Montacute, Somerset; founded 1100-40: granted to Montacute by William, son of Robert c.1100; became denizen: independent from 1407; dissolved 1537; granted to Laurence Courtney 1534/5	St Carroc Monastery; St Syriac's Monastery; St Cyricus and St Julitta's Monastery; St Cadix's Monastery; St Syriac's Cell
St German's Priory ^{+}		Celtic monks possibly founded 7th century; secular canons episcopal diocesan cathedral founded c.936; see transferred to new site at Crediton, Devon 1042; monks or secular founded 1042; Augustinian Canons Regular refounded 1184 (1161-87); dissolved 2 March 1539; granted to Catherine Champernoun, John Ridgeway and others 1541/2; now in use as parish church; remains of claustral buildings incorporated into Port Eliot House	The Priory Church of Saint German, Saint Germans
St Goran's Monastery, St Goran		Celtic monks founded 6th century; patronised by St Goran in the time of St Petroc; dissolved after 1083; church and lands granted to the college of Glasney 1269	
St Kew Cell ^{~}		monks founded 6th century (in the time of St Samson); purported Augustinian cell secular minster status confirmed by King Edgar, who granted land to the minster 961-3; secular collegiate clerks or secular canons until 1283; Augustinian Secular Canons — from Plympton, Devon until before 1283 church rebuilt 1496 and restored 1883	St Daw (or St Docco) Saint Kew (from 1440)
St Matthew's Monastery		uncertain order and foundation	
St Mawgan Monastery ^{+}		Celtic monks lands passed to the Bishop before 1085; Cluniac monks; Carmelite convent possibly built on site 16th century	Lanherne Monastery; St Mawgan in Pydar Monastery
St Michael's Mount Priory ^{+}		Saxon Benedictine? monks 8th century-11th century; Benedictine monks founded 1087-90; church consecrated 1135; alien house: dependent on Mont-St-Michel, Normandy granted by Edward the Confessor to Mont-St-Michel before 1050; seized during wars with the French 1362; dissolved c.1414; granted by Henry VI to King's College, Cambridge; granted by Edward IV to Syon Abbey; used alternately as fortress and monastery and private residence with public access; (NT)	
St Neot's Monastery, St Neot		Celtic monks founded 6th century?; dissolved after 1084	Saint Aniet
St Piran's Monastery, Perranzabuloe		Celtic monks founded 6th century?; dissolved before c.1085	
Saltash Monastery		uncertain order and foundation	
Scilly Priory		Celtic monks, monastic cells founded before 1066; Benedictine monks cell dependent on Tavistock, Devon; founded before 1114; dissolved c.1538; Tresco Abbey Gardens created by Augustus Smith around the priory remains in 1834	The Priory Church of St Nicholas, Scilly ____________________; Tresco Cell
Sclerder Abbey ^{+}		Dames de la Retraite founded c.1843; dissolved 1852; Franciscan Recollects founded 1858; dissolved 1864; Carmelite founded 1864; dissolved 1871; Sisters of the Sacred Hearts of Jesus and Mary founded 1904; dissolved 1910; Minoresses — from Rennes 1914-1920; Minoresses — from Bullingham 1922-1981; Franciscan c.1925; Carmelite — from Quidenham 1981-2014; Chemin Neuf 2014-; extant	
Sele Priory		Benedictine monks alien house: dependent on St-Florent-de-Saumur; founded before 1126; dissolved 1396	
Temple property ^{+}		Knights Templar; Knights Hospitaller	
Temple Templars Preceptory ^{#}		Knights Templar founded 12th century; dissolved 1308-12; asserted to have become a preceptory of Knights Hospitallers	
Tintagel Monastery		remains interpreted as Celtic monastic dependent on Bodmin; founded c.350; popular tradition as medieval Benedictine nunnery: evidence lacking; Norman castle built on site; current academic consensus regards earlier settlement as secular	
Trebeigh Preceptory ^{#}		Knights Templar (purportedly); Knights Hospitaller founded before 1199 "by the bounty of" Henry de Pomeral and Reginald Marsh; united with Ansty before 1432; dissolved after 1557/8; granted to Henry Wilby and George Blythe 1573/4	Treleigh Preceptory; Turleigh Preceptory
Tregonan Cell, St Ewe		Celtic monks dependent on St Keverne's Monastery founded 6th century; dissolved 11th century	
Tregonan Grange		Cistercian monks grange of Beaulieu, Hampshire founded before 1263; dissolved before 1527; "considerable remains" existing 1755 have since disappeared	St Keverne Grange
Tregony Priory ^{~}		Augustinian Canons Regular alien house: priory cell dependent on Le Val, Bayeux; founded before 1125(?); granted to Merton, Surrey 1267	The Priory Church of St James, Tregony ____________________; Tregoney Priory
Truro — Convent of the Epiphany ^		Community of the Epiphany, Anglican	
Truro Blackfriars		Dominican Friars (under the Visitation of London) founded before 1259 (during the reign of Henry III) by the Reskimer family; (church consecrated 1259-60); dissolved 1538; granted to Edward Anglianby 1553/4	
Tywardreath Priory		Benedictine monks alien house: daughter house of St-Serge, Angers founded c.1088 by Richard fitz Turold, Lord of Cardinham Castle, chief baron of Cornwall (or 1169 "by some noblemen", or 1135); became denizen: independent c.1400; dissolved 1536; granted to Edward, Earl of Hertford 1542/3	St Andrew ____________________; Truwardraith Priory

Return to top of page

=== Cumbria ===
(For references and location detail see List of monastic houses in Cumbria)

Foundation	Image	Communities & provenance	Formal name or dedication & alternative names
Appleby Whitefriars ^{#}		Carmelite Friars founded 1281 (c.1290-3) by Lords Vescy, Percy, and Clifford; dissolved 1539	
Armathwaite Nunnery		Benedictine nuns founded before 1200 (6 January 1089 dubiously purported), endowed by William Rufus; dissolved 1537; granted to William Gryme or Carleil 1552/3	(church dedicated to Jesus Christ and the Blessed Virgin Mary) ____________________; Armethwaite Nunnery
Bleatarn Grange		Cistercian monks grange dependent on Byland, Yorkshire; founded during the reign of Henry II	
Calder Abbey		Savignac monks — from Furness; founded 10 January 1135-1137 by Ranulf Meschin, first Lord of Cumberland; community released from jurisdiction of Furness to that of Savigny; establishment ruined; transferred to Hood 1138; Savignac monks — from Furness; refounded c.1142-3, rebuilt; Cistercian monks orders merged 17 September 1147; dissolved 1536; granted to Thomas Leigh 1538/9; now in private ownership without public access	Caldre Abbey
Carlisle Cathedral Priory ^{+}		purported monastery of monks and nuns founded 686 on land granted by Ecgfrith, King of Northumbria; destroyed in raids by the Danes c.875; rebuilt before 1092 by William Rufus and Walter, a Norman priest; secular canons from before 1092; Augustinian Canons Regular founded 1122 and built by Henry I; Augustinian Canons Regular — Arroasian(?) 1133; dissolved 1540: last prior appointed as first dean of the cathedral; episcopal diocesan cathedral founded 1133; extant	The Priory Church of the Holy Trinity, Carlisle The Cathedral Church of The Holy and Undivided Trinity, Carlisle (1133) ____________________; Carlisle Priory
Carlisle Blackfriars		Dominican Friars (under the Visitation of York) founded (before?) 1233 outside the city walls, but ordered to be demolished for a highway; moved 1237; dissolved 1539	
Carlisle Greyfriars		Franciscan Friars Minor, Conventual (under the Custody of Newcastle) founded 1233; church destroyed by fire in 1292 and rebuilt; dissolved 1539	
Cartmel Priory ^{+}		Augustinian Canons Regular founded 1189/94 by William Marshall, Baron of Cartmel and Earl of Pembroke; dissolved 1536/7; granted to John Holcroft 1540/1; church now in parochial use	Kertmel Priory
Chapel-le-Wood Cell		Premonstratensian Canons cell dependent on Cockersand	
Conishead Priory ^{^}, Ulverston		originally a hospital founded 1160 (after 1154); Augustinian Canons Regular founded 1188 (before 1181) by Gamel de Pennington (or William de Lancaster II); still occupied by canons at 16 October 1536; country house named 'Conishead Priory' built on site: and currently the home of the Buddhist Manjushri Kadampa Meditation Centre	The Priory Church of the Blessed Virgin Mary, Conishead ____________________; Conisheved Priory
Dacre Abbey		monks founded before 731; destroyed c.875 by Vikings; refounded before 926; Parish Church of St Andrew built to the south of the site	
Furness Abbey		Savignac monks — from Tulketh (Lancashire) dependent on Savigny; (founded 4 July 1124 at Tulketh by Stephen, Count of Boulogne); transferred from Tulketh 1126 (1124-7); Cistercian monks orders merged 17 September 1147; dissolved 1537; granted to Thomas Cromwell; (EH)	Furnes Abbey
Hawkshead Grange		Cistercian monks grange of Furness; founded c.1160; 17th century Hawkshead Old Hall incorporates remains of grange; currently in use as a farmhouse	
Holmcultram Abbey ^{+}, Abbeytown		Cistercian monks — from Melrose, Scotland founded 30 December 1150 by Henry, son of David, King of Scotland; dissolved 1538; church in parochial use until destroyed in an arson incident 9 June 2006; roof and plasterwork replaced; restoration ongoing, church in use again (2012)	Holm Cultram Abbey; Holme Cultram Abbey
Holme Eden Abbey		Benedictine nuns removed from Fort Augustus, Invernessshire 1921; dissolved 1983; formerly Holme Eden Hall; altered for use as a nursing home	Priory of Saint Scholastica
Kirkby Lonsdale	Benedictine monks manor of St Mary's Abbey, York — incorrectly asserted to have been a cell		
Kirkby Stephen	Benedictine monks estate of St Mary's Abbey, York — incorrectly asserted to have been a cell		
Lanercost Priory ^{+}		Augustinian Canons Regular — possibly from Pentney, Norfolk founded c.1166 (or 1169) by Robert de Villibus, Lord of Gilleisland; dissolved 1537; granted to Thomas Lord Dacre part converted into private house named 'Dacre Hall' church now in parochial use; (EH)	The Priory Church of Saint Mary Magdalene, Lanercost
Nunnery near Kirkoswald		Benedictine nuns house named 'Nunnery House' built on site	
Penrith Friary		Augustinian Friars (under the Limit of York) founded c.1291; dissolved 1539; house named 'The Friarage' built on site 1717	
Preston Patrick (?)Abbey		Premonstratensian Canons daughter house of Cockersand; founded after 1192(?); transferred to Shap before 1201; house named 'Challons Hall' built on or near site	The Abbey Church of Saint Mary Magdelene, Preston Patrick ____________________; Preston Abbey
Ravenstonedale Priory		Gilbertine Canons founded before c.1200; dissolved 1539(?); Parish Church of St Oswald built immediately to the south of the site	Ravenstonedale Cell
St Bees Priory ^{+}		nuns cell? founded before c.640?, during the reign of King Oswald by Bega; brief existence; transferred to Hartlepool, Northumbria (County Durham); or founded after 850 (c.900) by Bega — possible brief existence, though more likely an anchorites cell; Benedictine monks daughter house of St Mary's, York; founded not before c.1120 by William Meschin, on site of earlier church (c.900?); dissolved 16 October 1539; granted to Sir Thomas Challoner 1553/4; church now in parochial use	The Priory Church of SS Mary and Bega, Saint Bees, Saint Bees Priory ____________________; St Bee's Priory
St Constantine's Cells		Benedictine monks three cells, hermitage dependent on Wetheral; founded before 1112;	
Seaton Priory		Benedictine nuns daughter house of Nunburnholme, Yorkshire; founded c.1190-1200 by Henry Kirby; independent from after 1313; dissolved 1540; granted to Hugh Askue 1541/2; site now occupied by farmhouse named 'Seaton Hall'	Nunnery of Leakly, in Seaton; Seton Priory; Lekeley Priory
Shap Abbey		Premonstratensian Canons daughter house of Cockersand; (community founded at Preston Patrick before 1192(?)); transferred 1201 (1199), built (during the reign of Henry II) by Thomas Fitz Gospatrick; dissolved 1540; granted to Thomas Lord Wharton 1544/5; (EH)	Hepp Abbey
Wetheral Priory		Benedictine monks — from St Mary's, York dependent on York; founded 1106 by Ranulph Meschin, Earl of Cumberland; dissolved 20 October 1538; granted 1541/2	The Priory Church of Saint Constantine, Wetheral The Priory Church of the Holy Trinity, Saint Mary and Saint Constantine, Wetheral ____________________; Wetherall Priory

Return to top of page

=== Derbyshire ===
(For references and location detail see List of monastic houses in Derbyshire)

Foundation	Image	Communities & provenance	Formal name or dedication & alternative names
Barrow Camera ^^{?}		Knights Hospitaller founded before 1189: church granted by Robert de Bakepuze; probably not inhabited by brothers for long periods; annexed to Yeaveley before 1433; remains possibly incorporated into Arleston House built on site 16th/17th century	
Beauchief Abbey	Historical county location. See entry under South Yorkshire		
Bradbourne Priory		Augustinian Canons Regular cell? dependent on Dunstable, Bedfordshire founded 1238: granted by Geoffrey de Cauceis; dissolved ?	Church of All Saints, Bradbourne
Breadsall Priory		Augustinian Canons Regular founded between 1220 and 1266; (erroneous ref. to Friars Eremites (Austin Friars) in records of 1266); dissolved 1536; granted to Henry, Duke of Suffolk 1552; 13th-century arch retained in the basement of Elizabethan mansion built on site, became hotel and golf club 'Marriott Breadsall Priory Hotel' 1980	The Priory Church of the Holy Trinity, Breadsall ____________________; Brisoll Priory; Bredsall Park
Calke Priory ^{#}		Augustinian Canons Regular founded c.1131/before 1129-39 or 1130-6/before 1161 by Maud, widow of the Earl of Chester; transferred to Repton 1153–1172; dissolved 1538; granted to John, Earl of Warwick 1547; mansion named 'Calke Abbey' built on site	The Priory Church of Saint Giles, Calke ____________________; Calke Cell
Dale (Stanley Park) Abbey, Deepdale		hermitage 12th century Augustinian Canons Regular dependent on Calke; cell founded 1153-8 by Serlo de Grendon; canons recalled to Calke c.1184; Premonstratensian Canons from Tupholme, Lincolnshire; founded ?c.1185; canons recalled to Tupholme c.1192; canons transferred from Welbeck, Nottinghamshire c.1196; canons transferred from Newsham (Newhouse), Lincolnshire c.1200; avoided suppression 1536 by payment of substantial fine; dissolved 24 October 1538	The Abbey Church of the Blessed Virgin Mary, Dale ____________________; Stanley Park Abbey; (De Parco Stanley); Le Dale Abbey
Darley Priory ^{^}		Augustinian Canons Regular daughter house of St Helen's, Derby; founded c.1146 by Robert de Ferraris (Ferrers), Earl of Derby: transferred from St Helen's; dissolved 22 October 1538; granted to Sir William West 1540/1; house named 'Darley Park' built on site 18th century, demolished 1962; a monastic building (probably the priory guest house) is now 15th century Darley Abbey public house — 'Old Abbey Inn'; partly 15th-century cottage at 7 Abbey Lane may incorporate monastic remains	The Priory Church of Saint Mary, Darley ____________________; Darley Abbey; Little Derby Friary; Little Dirby Friary
Derby Blackfriars		Dominican Friars (under the Visitation of Oxford) founded before 1239; dissolved 3 January 1539; occupied by an 18th-century Friary Hotel built on site; converted into a public house 1996; currently in use as a nightclub	The Annunciation
Derby — King's Mead Priory		Benedictine nuns founded 1149-59 (c.1160) by the abbess of Derby; dissolved 1536; granted to Francis, Earl of Shrewsbury 1543/4; site now occupied by a 16th/17th-century building	St Mary ____________________; De Pratis Priory
Derby Priory (Augustinian)		Augustinian Canons Regular founded 1137 by Towyne, a burgess of Derby; most of the monks transferred to Darley c.1146; reduced to cell 1154; became a hospital 1160; ceased before 1360	The Priory Church of Saint Helen, Derby
Derby Priory (Cluniac)		Cluniac monks alien house: priory cell dependent on Bermondsey, Surrey (Greater London); founded before 1140; granted to Bermondsey by Waltheof, son of Sweyn; accidentally destroyed by fire; rebuilt c.1335; became denizen: independent from 1395; dissolved 1536;	The Priory Church of Saint James, Derby
Gresley Priory		Augustinian Canons Regular founded c.1135-40 by William de Greisley (or Fitz-Nigel); dissolved 1536; granted to Henry Cruche 1543/4; nave of the priory church in use as parochial church of Church Gresley	The Priory Church of Saint Mary and Saint George, Gresley ____________________; Church Gresley Priory; Greisley Priory
Lees Priory		Augustinian Canons Regular ?cell dependent on Rocester, Staffordshire; founded before c.1160?; dissolved after 1517?	Leyes Priory
Locko Preceptory		St. Lazarus Hospitallers and Leper Hospital founded c.1297; dissolved 1375	The Hospital of Saint Mary Magdalene ____________________; Lockhay Preceptory
Repton Priory ^^{+}		Anglo-Saxon monks and nuns — double monastery founded before 660 traditionally by St David; destroyed in raids by the Danes 874; Augustinian Canons Regular — from Calke founded c.1153-9; rebuilt 1172 by Maud, widow of Ranulph, Earl of Chester; dissolved 25 October 1538; remains incorporated into Repton School buildings (founded 1557); St Wystan's Church on site incorporates substantial remains of the Anglo-Saxon foundation	St Wystan The Priory Church of the Holy Trinity, Repton ____________________; Repingdon Priory
Yeaveley Preceptory, Stydd		Knights Hospitaller founded c.1136 (or c.1190 or 1268?) by Ralph de Fun and Sir William Meynill; dissolved 1535 (1540); granted to Charles, Lord Montjoy 1543/4; remains incorporated into farmhouse; the Church of St Saviour was part of the Hospitallers' possessions	St Mary and St John the Baptist ____________________; Yeaveley and Barrow Preceptory; Stydd Preceptory; Stede Preceptory; Yeveley Preceptory; Yeaveley and Stydd Preceptory

Return to top of page

=== Devon ===
(For references and location detail see List of monastic houses in Devon)

Foundation	Image	Communities & provenance	Formal name or dedication & alternative names
Allerton Cell		Benedictine hermits cell dependent on Tavistock	
Axminster Monastery ^{~}		Saxon monks or secular canons collegiate founded before 757 when Cyneheard the atheling was interred in the minster; secular canons collegiate founded c.936 by King Athelstan; made dependent on York, Yorkshire 1060 by Edward the Confessor; dissolved 1535; collegiate and parochial church of St Mary possibly built on site during the Norman period	
Axmouth Priory		Benedictine monks alien house: possible monastic grange, dependent on Montebourg; founded before 1387 (during the reign of Henry II) by Richard de Rivers, Earl of Devonshire; dissolved 1414; granted to Walter Erle (Earl) 1552	
Barnstaple Priory		Cluniac monks alien house: daughter house of St-Martin-des-Champs, Paris founded c.1107 (before 1199) by Johel of Totness; became denizen: independent from 1403; dissolved 1535; granted to William, Lord Howard 1537/8	The Priory Church of Saint Mary Magdalene, Barnstaple The Church of Saint Mary the Virgin
Barnstaple Austin Friary (?)		Augustinian Friars licensed 1348 and 1353 — apparently never established due to objection by the prior of the Cluniac house	
Burlescombe Priory ^{≈}		Augustinian Canons Regular recorded in the time of Richard I, (probably Canonsleigh Priory, in the parish of Burlescombe)	Burdlescombe; possibly Canonsleigh
Bodmiscombe Preceptory		Knights Hospitaller founded after 1200(?) (possibly during the reign of Henry III); dissolved before 15th century?; apparently absorbed by Buckland 14th/15th century	Bothemescomb Preceptory
Braunton Monastery		traditionally site of monastery purportedly founded 5th century by St Branock (Brynach of Nevern)	
Brightley Priory ^{#}		Cistercian monks — from Waverley, Surrey founded 3 May 1136 (or 1132, 1133 or 1138) by Richard fitz Baldwin de Brioniis, Lord of Okehampton and Sheriff of Devon; abandoned 1141; transferred to Forde, Dorset; site now occupied by Brightley Farm, where a building is possibly a monastic chapel	
Buckfast Monastery		Benedictine monks founded 1018 by Aylward, Duk; Buckfast Abbey (see immediately below) built on site	
Buckfast Abbey *		Savignac monks — from Savigny founded 27 April 1136 by Ethelwerd, son of William Pomerei; built on site of Benedictine monastery (see immediately above); Cistercian monks orders merged 17 September 1147; dissolved 1539; granted to Sir Thomas Dennys 1539/40; became ruinous Benedictine monks priory founded 1882, rebuilt 1884 to 1938 (church 1906 to 1938); raised to abbey status 1902; affiliated to the English Congregation 1960; extant	The Abbey Church of Our Lady, Buckfast ____________________; Buckfastre Abbey
Buckland Abbey		Cistercian monks — from Quarr, Isle of Wight founded 1278 by Amicia, Countess of Devonshire; dissolved 1539; granted to Sir Richard Greynfeld (Grenville) 1541/2; converted into a mansion named the 'Cider House' by 1576; sold to Sir Francis Drake 1581; remained with that family to 1946; house granted to NT 1949 currently principally in use as a museum; (NT)	The Abbey Church of Saint Benedict, Buckland
Canonsleigh Abbey ^		On site of Leigh, in the parish of Burlescombe; Augustinian Canons Regular — from Plympton? priory founded c.1161-1173 by Walter II de Claville, (a descendant of the Domesday Book tenant Walter I de Claville), lord of the manor of Burlescombe; dissolved before 1285; Augustinian Canonesses abbey founded before 1285 by Maud, Countess of Devon; dissolved 1539; remains now incorporated into farm buildings	The Priory Church of the Blessed Virgin Mary and Saint John the Evangelist, Leigh (1161–1285) The Priory Church of the Blessed Virgin Mary and Saint John the Evangelist and Saint Etheldreda, Leigh (1285–1539) ____________________; Leigh Abbey; Canon's Leigh; Burlescombe Priory? (see above)
Chudleigh Abbey		Brigittine nuns transferred from Spettisbury, Dorset 1887; transferred to Marley House, Rattery (now Syon Abbey) 1925	The Abbey Church of Saint Bridget of Syon, Chudleigh
Churchill Monastery		uncertain order and foundation	
Cornworthy Priory		Augustinian Canonesses founded 1205/1238 by the Edgecomb family; dissolved 1539; granted to Edward Harris and John Williams 1560	Court Prior
Cove		Knights Hospitaller member of Bodmiscombe Preceptory	
Cowick Priory ^{#}		Benedictine monks alien house: cell dependent on Bec-Hellouin; founded 1144: granted as cell to Bec-Hellouin by William Fitz-Baldwin; became denizen: granted to Eton College 1451; granted to Tavistock after 1464; dissolved 1538	The Priory Church of Saint Andrew, Cowick ____________________; Cowick Priory
Crediton Monastery		monks founded 739; secular episcopal diocesan cathedral founded 909: see reputedly transferred from Bishops Tawton; see transferred to Exeter 1050; secular collegiate refounded 1050; dissolved 1548	St Gregory (possibly)
Dartmouth Austin Friars		Augustinian Friars (under the Limit of Oxford) (founded at Clifton in Dartmouth 1331); dissolved before 1348; church of St Petrox built on site 16th century	
Dartmouth Monastery		monks? uncertain order and foundation chapel of St Patrick in the Castle annexed as a cell to a "great abbey"	
Denbury Priory		Benedictine monks dependent on Tavistock; founded 1086; dissolved 1539; site now on Wrenwell Farm	Denbury Cell; Denbury Grange
Dunkeswell Abbey		Cistercian monks daughter house of Forde, Dorset; founded 16 November 1201 by William Briwere; dissolved 1539; granted to John, Lord Russell 1534/5; site in multiple ownership, with the Holy Trinity parish chapel built on site 1842	
Exeter Cathedral Priory ^{+}		founded ?before c.690; Benedictine? monks 932 (see immediately below) secular canons founded 1050; episcopal diocesan cathedral founded 1050: see transferred from Crediton; extant	The Priory Church of the Blessed Virgin Mary and Saint Peter The Cathedral Church of Saint Peter in Exeter
Exeter Monastery		Saxon founded 868 by King Etheldred	
Exeter Monastery		Benedictine monks founded 932 by King Athelstan; monks repeatedly fled through Danish raids but recalled by Canute 1019	
Exeter Nunnery (?)		Augustinian Canonesses supposedly founded c.968; purportedly rebuilt as the Deanery 15th century Later sources deny its existence.	
Exeter Priory (?)		Carthusian monks licence granted to Richard Stapleton 1331/2 to build and endow a monastery — apparently never established	
Exeter Blackfriars ^{#}		Dominican Friars (under the Visitation of London) founded before 1232; dissolved 1538; house named 'Bedford House' built on site, demolished 1773	Exeter Blackfriars
Exeter Greyfriars		Franciscan Friars (under the Custody of Bristol) founded before 1240; transferred by Thomas Bitton (Bytten), Bishop of Exeter, to new site south of the South City Gate c.1292-1303 (see immediately below); dissolved 1538	
Exeter Greyfriars		Franciscan Friars (under the Custody of Bristol) transferred by Bishop Bytten from behind the North and West Gates c.1292-1303 (see immediately above)	
Exeter — Polsloe Priory		Benedictine nuns founded before/c.1160: transferred from Oldbury, Warwickshire; dissolved 1536 (1538); granted to John, Earl of Warwick during the reign of Edward VI; largely demolished, remaining range converted into country house	The Priory Church of Saint Katherine, Polsloe ____________________; Polleshoo Priory
Exeter — St James Priory ^{#}		Cluniac monks daughter house of the abbey of St Martin-in-the-fields, Paris; founded before 1143 (1141) by Baldwin de Redverus (Redvers/Rivers), Earl of Devon; dissolved; house built on site called 'The Old Abbey'	St James
Exeter — St Nicholas Priory ^	St Nicholas Priory, Exeter	Benedictine monks — from Battle, Sussex founded 1087 by William the Conqueror; dissolved 1536; granted to Sir Thomas Denys 1540/1; private houses built on site 1820; monastic architecture restored; in ownership of Exeter Corporation 1913; open to public as a museum 1916; (closed for repair until 2008)	The Priory Church of Saint Nicolas, Exeter ____________________; Benedictine Priory of St Nicholas
Exminster Monastery ^{#}		pre-conquest monastic or secular community founded 8th century	
Frithelstock Priory		Augustinian Canons Regular — Arroasian founded c.1220 by Sir Robert Beauchamp, Kt.; dissolved 1536; granted to Arthur Viscount Lisle 1537/8	The Abbey Church of Saint Mary and Saint Gregory, Frithlestock ____________________; Frethelstoke Priory; Fristoke Priory
Hartland Abbey		secular college founded before 1066 by Gytha, wife of Earl Godwin; Augustinian Canons Regular — Arroasian founded 1161-9 (secular collegiate church of St Nectan and its endowments granted to Richard, Archdeacon of Poictiers by Geoffrey of Dinam; approved by Henry II and Bartholomew, Bishop of Exeter); dissolved 21 February 1539; granted to William Abbot 1545/6; remains (cloisters) incorporated into house named 'Hartland Abbey' built on site	Hertland Abbey
Indio Monastery		uncertain order and foundation	
Ipplepen Priory ^{#}		Augustinian Canons Regular alien house: cell, daughter house of St Pierre-Rille founded c.1143(?): church granted by the Fougères family to the priory, transferred from Notre-Dame-de-Fougères; dissolved c.1414; granted to Ottery St Mary 1438; house called 'The Priory' possibly built on site	
Ivybridge Priory +		Sisters of the Sacred Hearts of Jesus & Mary — from St. Quay 1910; Augustinian (Augustinian Recollect) founded 1932; closed 2016 with building now in parochial use; originally 'Cadleigh House'	St Austin's Priory
Kerswell Priory		Cluniac monks alien house: cell dependent on Montacute, Somerset; founded 1119–1129; became denizen: independent from 1407; dissolved 1538 or 1539; granted to John Etherege (Atherege) 1546/7; 16th century house built on site	Careswell Cell
Leigh Cell		Sauvignac monks grange(?) dependent on Buckfast(?) founded c.1137(?); Cistercian monks orders merged 17 September 1147	Leigh Grange
Marsh Barton Priory ^{#}		Augustinian Canons Regular dependent on Plympton founded 1142; dissolved 1539	St Mary St Mary de Marsh
Modbury Priory		Benedictine monks alien house: dependent on St-Pierre-sur-Dives founded c.1140 by Sir Peter-sur-Dive, sic., or (purportedly) by a member of the Chambernoun family; extant 1430; dissolved c.1441; granted to Eton College by Edward VI; nominally reverted to Tavistock c.1461-67	St George
Newenham Abbey		Cistercian monks daughter house of Beaulieu, Hampshire founded 6 January 1246 or 1247 by Reginald de Mohun, Earl of Somerset; dissolved 1539; leased to the Duke of Suffolk; granted to Thomas, Duke of Norfolk 1562/3	The Priory Church of the Blessed Virgin Mary, Newenham ____________________; Neuham Abbey
Otterton Priory		Benedictine monks alien house: cell dependent on Mont-St-Michel, Normandy; founded before 1087 by the monks of Mont-St-Michel; dissolved 1414; subsequently granted to Syon Abbey; granted to Richard Duke at the dissolution of Syon 1539; part of claustral building converted into mansion	Otterington Priory
Ottery St Mary Monastery	supposed pre-Conquest monastery ("disproved")		
Pilton Priory^{+}		Benedictine monks founded ?before 12th century purportedly by King Athelstan (evidence lacking and disputed); dissolved 1539	The Priory Church of Saint Mary the Virgin, Pilton
Plymouth — St Dunstan's Abbey		Sisters of the Most Holy Trinity founded by Priscilla Lydia Sellon with the support of the Henry Phillpott, Bishop of Exeter; transferred to Berkshire 1906; property transferred to St Mary the Virgin at Wantage, who continued in use as St Dunstan Abbey School for Girls	The Abbey Church of Saint Dunstan, Plymouth; St Dunstan of Glastonbury
Plymouth Blackfriars(?)		purported Dominican Friars founded 1431; site now occupied by the Black Friars Distillery; possible confusion with Greyfriars	
Plymouth Greyfriars		Franciscan Friars (under the Custody of Bristol) founded 1383; in private ownership 1513; dissolved 1538	Plymouth Friary
Plymouth Whitefriars ^{#}		Carmelite Friars founded before 1296–7; dissolved 1538	
Plympton Priory		secular collegiate founded 904 (before 909); Augustinian Canons Regular church built on site 1121 by William Warlewas (Bishop of Exeter 1150-9); dissolved 1539	The Priory Church of Saint Peter and Saint Paul, Plympton
St Michael's Monastery		Benedictine monks purported cell dependent on Malmesbury	St Michael
Sidmouth Priory (Augustinian) (?)		purported foundation of Augustinian Canons Regular probable confusion with Benedictine founded (see immediately below)	
Sidmouth Priory		Benedictine monks alien house: cell or grange dependent on Mont St Michel founded 11th century: manor granted by William the Conqueror; dissolved 1414(?); Bridgettine monks grange of Syon Abbey c.1431; dissolved; remains incorporated in Marlborough Hotel	
Tavistock Abbey		Benedictine monks founded 961/974 (or 975-80) (begun by Ordgar, Earl of Devonshire and completed by his son); dissolved 1539; granted to John, Lord Russell 1539/40; mansion built on site, now 'The Bedford Hotel'	The Abbey Church of the Blessed Virgin Mary and Saint Rumon, Tavistock ____________________; Tavestock Abbey
Teignmouth Abbey ^		Benedictine nuns (founded at Dunkirk, Flanders 1662, daughter of Ghent) transferred from Hammersmith, London 1862; now divided up as private housing	The Abbey Church of Saint Scholastica, Teignmouth
Torre Abbey		Premonstratensian Canons — from Welbeck, Nottinghamshire founded 1196 by William Briwere; dissolved 1539; granted to Sir John St.Leger 1543/4; country house built on site, now in ownership of Torbay Corporation	Torr Abbey
Totnes Priory		Benedictine monks alien house: cell dependent on St-Serge, Angers founded c.1088 by John Aluredi; became denizen: independent from before 1416; dissolved 1536; granted to Catherine Champernoun and others 1543/4; rebuilt priory church in parochial use, municipal buildings built on claustral site	
Totnes Trinitarian Priory		Trinitarian monks founded 1271; dissolved 1509 (suppressed to 1519); granted to the vicars of Exeter Cathedral 1519; seized by the Crown; returned to the vicars 16th century until 1801	Little Totnes Priory; Werland Priory; Warland Priory
Townstall Monastery, Dartmouth		supposed alien cell	
Yodby Monastery		uncertain order and foundation	

Return to top of page

=== Dorset ===
(For references and location detail see List of monastic houses in Dorset)

Foundation	Image	Communities & provenance	Formal name or dedication & alternative names
Abbotsbury Abbey ^{+}		secular canons collegiate founded c.1026 by Orcus, steward to Canute; Benedictine monks — from Cerne; founded 1044 (during the reign of Edward the Confessor) by Orcius or by his widow Tola; dissolved 12 March 1539; granted to Sir Giles Strangwaies 1543/4; much in private ownership, partly in parochial use	The Abbey Church of Saint Peter ____________________; Abbotesbury Abbey; Abbodesbirig Abbey
Beaminster		pre-conquest monastic or secular community founded before 862	Bebingmynster
Bindon Abbey		Cistercian monks — from Little Bindon dependent on Forde; founded 22 or 27 September 1172 by Robert de Burgo and his wife Maud; dissolved 1539; granted to Sir Richard Poynings 1540/1; now in private ownership	
Blackmoor Priory Hermitage		order and foundation uncertain hermitage in existence by 1300, with brothers apparently following a rule similar to Augustinian Friars; dissolved/abandoned, becoming a free chapel after 1424	Hermitage
Bridport Whitefriars (?)		purported foundation for Carmelite Friars founded 1261; probably ceased to exist before 1365	
Bridport Priory		order uncertain 13th century; converted into a residence named 'St Jones'	
Cerne Abbey ^, Cerne Abbas		monastic before 604 founded by St Augustine hermitage; secular ? 9th century; Benedictine monks founded before 987 by Engleward (Egelward); purportedly destroyed by Canute; dissolved 1539; granted to John Dudley and ___ Ascough 1574/5; remains now incorporated into private house	St Peter St Mary, St Peter and St Benedict St Edwold (St Athelwold) ____________________; Cernell Abbey
Charminster		pre-conquest monastic or secular community; parish church of St Mary (dating from 11th century) possible successor of minster on site	
Chilcombe Camera		Knights Hospitaller dissolved before 1308	
Christchurch Priory ^{+}		tradition of very early monastery; secular canons collegiate founded before/c.1060; manor and church granted by Henry I to Richard de Redvers and Baldwin de Redvers, Earl of Devon; Augustinian Canons Regular founded 1150, by petition of Hilary, Bishop of Chichester, and the bishop of Winchester to Richard de Redvers; dissolved 28 November 1539; granted to Joseph Kirton 1545/6; on site of earlier church demolished 1094; priory church 1540, now in parochial use	The Priory Church of Christ, Christchurch Church of the Holy Trinity, Twyneham ____________________; Twyneham Priory; Twinham Priory
Cranborne Priory		tradition of early monastery Benedictine monks founded c.(?)980 by Haylward Snew (Aylward Sneaw (Snow)); becoming dependent on Tewkesbury (of which Cranborne was previously the mother house) in 11th century; abbot and 57 monks removed to Tewkesbury 1102, Cranborne reduced to priory status, becoming a cell dependent on Tewkesbury; dissolved 31 January 1540; granted to Thomas Francis 1559/60	The Abbey Church of the Blessed Virgin Mary and Saint Bartholomew The Priory Church of The Blessed Virgin Mary and Saint Bartholomew, Cranborne ____________________; Cranbourne Priory; Cranburn Cell
Dorchester Greyfriars ^{#}		Franciscan Friars Minor, Conventual (under the Custody of Bristol) founded before 1267 by "the ancestors of Sir John Chidiock"; dissolved 1538 (1536); granted to Sir Edmund Peckham 1543/4	
Forde Abbey ^		Cistercian monks daughter house of Waverley, Surrey; (community founded at Brightley, Devon 1136 or 1138) transferred from Brightley 1146/8?; dissolved 1539; claustral remains now incorporated a mansion with public access	
Frampton Priory		Benedictine monks alien house: daughter house of St-Etienne, Caen, Normandy; founded before 1077 by William the Conqueror; dissolved before 1414; granted to St Stephen's College, Westminster 1437; granted to Sir Christopher Hatton 1571/2, who sold it to John Brown, Esq.	
Fryer Mayne Preceptory		Knights Hospitaller founded before 1275; shared single preceptor with Baddesley 15th century; formally merged with Baddesley 1471; dissolved; granted to William Pole and Edward Downing 1563/4	Friary Mayne Preceptory; Friar Mayne Preceptory; Freyer Mayne Preceptory; Mayne Preceptory; Mayne Ospitalis
Gillingham Friary		possible Dominican Friars founded c.1267: Henry II granted oak for repair of the Dominicans' church; no other reference	
Gillingham Minster		Saxon minster 19th century St Mary's Parish Church possibly on site	
Hilfield Friary *		Franciscan Friars founded 1921 in farm buildings; extant	The Friary of Saint Francis, Hilfield
Holme Priory		Cluniac monks alien house: dependent on Montacute founded 1142 (mid 12th century or c.1107) by Robert de Lincoln; became denizen: independent from 1407; dissolved 1539; granted to John Hannon 1547; parish church until 1746; mansion named 'Holme Priory House' built on site of remains	The Blessed Virgin Mary ____________________; East Holme Priory; Holne Priory; Holme Cell
Horton Priory		Benedictine monks abbey founded 961 (960 or (c.)970) by Ordgar, Earl of Devonshire or his son Ordulph (Edulph); probably destroyed in raids by the Danes 997; refounded c.1050; reduced to priory cell status 1122 under Henry I, dependent on Sherborne; dissolved 1539; granted to Edward, Duke of Somerset 1547; then to William, Earl of Pembroke; 18th-century church built on site of ruins of previous parochial church on the site of the priory	St Wolfrida ____________________; Horton Abbey; Horton Cell
Iwerne Minster		pre-conquest monastic or secular community; parish church of St Mary possible successor of minster on site	
Kingston Camera		Knights Hospitaller member of Fryer Mayne, with Stinsford church	
Little Bindon Abbey		Cistercian monks — from Forde founded 1149 by William de Glastonia; transferred to Bindon 1172; much of the masonry used in the construction of Lulworth Castle	
Loders Priory		Benedictine monks alien house: daughter house of St-Mary-de-Montebourg, Normandy founded c.1107 (during the reign of Henry I) by Richard Re Redveriis; Carthusian monks under the monastery of St Anne at Coventry 1399-1414; Priory Church now in parochial use; Brigetine nuns (under Syon, Isleworth) 1414	St Mary Magdalen ____________________; Lodres Priory
Lulworth Abbey		Trappist monks — from Val Sainte, Switzerland founded 1795 by Mr Thomas Weld; raised to abbey status 1813; forced to leave England and returned to Melleray 1817	The Monastery of the Most Holy Trinity, Lulworth
Lyme Friary (?)		Carmelite Friars — to be licensed to William Darre, chaplain — apparently never established	Lyme Regis Friary
Lytchett Minster		pre-conquest monastic or secular community	
Melcombe Priory, Melcombe Regis		Dominican Friars (under the Visitation of London) founded 1418 by Rogers Esq. of Brianston; dissolved 1538; granted to Sir John Rogers 1543/4	Milton Friary; Melcombe Regis Friary
Milton Abbey ^, Milton Abbas		secular college founded 938 (or 933) by King Athelstan; Benedictine monks founded 964; destroyed by fire 1309; rebuilt 1322; dissolved 1539; granted to Sir John Tregonwall 1539/40; restored 1789 and 1865; domestic remains incorporated into a mansion 1771; Abbey Church is owned by the Diocese of Salisbury but used by Milton Abbey School in term time as its chapel. The Abbey Church is open to the public and accessed through the school grounds.	The Priory Church of Saint Michael and Saint Mary, Milton The Abbey Church of The Blessed Virgin Mary, Saint Samson and Saint Branwalader, Milton ____________________; Middleton Abbey
Muckleford Grange		possible Tironensian monks alien house: cell (grange?) dependent on Tiron; estate granted to Tiron Abbey, Normandy, de facto controlled by Andwell, Hampshire	
Piddletrenthide Priory		Benedictine monks cell dependent on Hyde Abbey, Hampshire founded unknown; dissolved 1354 (1345?); chapel demolished after 1382	Piddletrenthide Cell
Poole — St George's Friary		Friars of St George — apparently a guild property	
Povington Priory		Benedictine monks alien house: grange: dependent on Bec-Hellouin; foundation date unknown, manor granted to Bec-Hellouin by Robert Fitz Gerold; dissolved 1230; reckoned to be a parcel of Ogbourne by 1291	Povington Grange
Shaftesbury Abbey		Benedictine nuns founded c.888 by Alfred (or before 860 by Alfred, his father Æthelbald and brothers Æthelbert and Ethelred), possibly on site of 7th century Saxon minster (see immediately below); Benedictine nuns refounded during the reign of Edgar; dissolved 2 March 1539; granted to William, Earl of Southampton 1547/8; remains now within a walled garden	The Abbey Church of Saint Mary, Shaftesbury The Abbey Church of Saint Mary, Saint Edward, King and Martyr, Shaftesbury
Shaftesbury Minster		Saxon nuns possibly founded before c.670; destroyed? in raids by the Danes before 888; Benedictine nunnery possibly built on site (see immediately above)	
Shapwick Grange		purported priory order and foundation uncertain; acquired by the Carthusians at Sheen, Surrey (Greater London) after 1414; (limited corroboration for existence and status)	Shapwick Priory
Sherborne Abbey ^		founded before 672: granted by Cenwealh, King of Wessex; Saxon minster and bishop's see secular episcopal diocesan cathedral priory founded 705; Benedictine monks cathedral priory refounded c.993; see transferred to Old Sarum between 1075 and 1078; raised to abbey status 1172; dissolved 18 March 1539; granted to Sir John Horsey 1546/7; church now in parochial use monastic buildings now incorporated into a public school	The Blessed Virgin Mary ____________________; Shireburn Abbey
Spettisbury Priory		Benedictine nuns alien house: cell dependent on St-Pierre-de-Préaux; founded before 1100 (during the reign of William II) by Robert de Bellomonte, Earl of Mallent (Count of Meulan) and Earl of Leicester; annexed to Toft Monks 1324; privately leased 1390; granted to with am Priory by Henry V; dissolved 1535; granted to Charles Blount, Lord Mountjoy 1543/4	dedication unknown ____________________; Spetisbury Priory; Spectesbury Priory
St Monica's Priory, Spetisbury		Augustinian Canonesses Regular of the Windesheim Congregation 1800; Bridgettine Nuns 1861; Canons Regular of the Lateran 1887; Ursuline Nuns 1907-1926; sold at auction to Thomas Oakley 9 June 1927	The Priory of Saint Monica, Spetisbury
Stour Provost Grange		Benedictine monks alien house: grange dependent on St-Leger, Preaux; founded c.1070; dissolved c.1471	
Sturminster Marshall		pre-conquest monastic or secular community	
Sturminster Newton		pre-conquest monastic or secular community	
Tarrant Abbey		Anchoresses of "no order" founded c.1186; Cistercian nuns founded c.1100 by Richard Power, Bishop of Chichester (Richard le Poor of Salisbury), built by Ralph de Kahaynes; raised to abbey status before 1228; dissolved 13 March 1539; granted to Sir Thomas Wyat 1541/2; site now occupied by Abbey Farm; Tarrant Abbey House possibly incorporates remains of the abbey	St Mary and All Saints ____________________; Tarrant Crawford Abbey; Tarrant Kains Abbey; Tarrent Abbey; Tarrant Cell; possibly 'Camesterne' ('Camestrum') (St Mary Magdalene)
Wareham Nunnery		Benedictine? nuns alien house: daughter house of Lira, Normandy reputedly founded c.672 (late7th/early8th century); said to have been destroyed in raids by the Danes 876; traditionally refounded 915 by Elfleda; dissolved 997-8: again destroyed by the Danes; destroyed again 1015; monastic property in possession of St Wandrille Abbey (which held the minster) 1086; Benedictine priory built on site (see immediately below)	The Blessed Virgin Mary ____________________ monasterium of holy virgins
Wareham Priory		Benedictine monks alien house: cell dependent on Lyre Abbey, Normandy founded 12th century (during the reign of Henry I) by Robert, Earl of Leicester on site of earlier nunnery (see immediately above); ownership passed to Mount Grace, Yorkshire 1398; dissolved 1414; Carthusian monks granted to the Carthusians at Sheen, Surrey (Greater London) after 1414; dissolved 1536; granted to Thomas Reve and George Cotton; house named 'The Priory of Lady St Mary House' ('The Priory') built on site 16th century, possibly incorporates remains of the priory	Lady St Mary Priory ____________________; Warham Priory
West Lulworth Priory		Cistercian monks — from Forde founded 1149 (or 1171(?) by William de Glastonia); transferred to Bindon 1172; site close to 13th century Little Bindon chapel	
Wilcheswood Monastery		order uncertain founded 1373 by Roger le Walleys, lord of the manor of Langton Wallis; earliest dated charter 1295 (speculated to have followed Augustinian and Premonstratensian rules, or a small collegiate church); apparently dissolved 1536	St Leonard ____________________; Wilcheswood Priory; Wilkswood Priory
Wimborne Minster		Benedictine? nuns and monks founded before 705 by Cuthburh; destroyed ? 998; converted into a college of secular canons before 1066; dissolved 1547; granted to Edward, Duke of Somerset 1547; then to Giles Keylway and William Leonard; then to Edward, Lord Clinton	St Cuthburga ____________________; Winburn Priory; Twinborn Priory
Winterborn Monkton Grange		Cluniac monks alien house: grange dependent on Cluny founded before 1214; dissolved c.1450	Winterborn Grange; Winterborn Monckton
Yetminster		Saxon minster	

Return to top of page

=== County Durham ===
(For references and location detail see List of monastic houses in County Durham)

Foundation	Image	Communities & provenance	Formal name or dedication & alternative names
Barnard Castle Friary (?)		Augustinian Friars (under the Limit of York) founded 1381: licensed by Neville, Archbishop of York, land granted by Thomas Beauchamp, Earl of Warwick; possibly not established, but if so failed before 1387?	
Baxterwood Priory		Augustinian Canons Regular — possibly from Gisborough, Yorkshire via Haswell founded 1180; transferred from Haswell after 1180 (possibly before Haswell was built); dissolved 1196; lands appropriated by Finchale Priory	Priory Church of the Blessed Virgin Mary, Baxterwood ____________________; Bactanesford Priory
Bradbury Cell		Benedictine monks chapel and cell dependent on Nun Monkton, Yorkshire founded 12th century	
Clare Abbey, Darlington		Franciscan nuns — from Scorton Hall founded 1857, property granted by Sir Caranby Haggerston; transferred to Herefordshire, amalgamating with the house at Much Birch; Hospitaller Order of Saint John of God	The Abbey Church of Saint Clare, Darlington
Durham Cathedral Priory ^{+}		secular canons episcopal diocesan cathedral founded 997 (995); extant; founded 995 (997), built by Bishop Aldhun; Benedictine monks founded 1093 (or 1083) by Bishop William of St Carileph, who expelled the seculars; dissolved 1539	The Abbey Church of Saint Mary and Saint Cuthbert at Durham The Cathedral Church of Christ and Blessed Mary the Virgin, Durham
Durham Greyfriars		Franciscan Friars Minor, Conventual (under the Custody of Newcastle) founded before 1239; dissolved before 1240(?), friars apparently settled at the chapel of St Mary, but on meeting with opposition transferred to Hartlepool	Hartlepool Friary
Durham — St Anthony's Priory *		Minoresses founded at the former vicarage of St Nicholas Parish Church; Society of the Sacred Mission; extant	St Antony's Priory, Durham
Ebchester Nunnery		nuns founded before 660 by St Ebba (purportedly daughter of King Ethelfrid); destroyed in raids by the Danes c.875; reference to hermitage or chapel mid-12th century and 1241 (Chapel of St Mary, Yareshale (Yareshaugh)) possibly on site, private chapel of Bishops of Durham before mid-15th century	St Ebbas Nunnery
Egglestone Abbey		Premonstratensian Canons — from Easby, Yorkshire daughter house of Easby; founded between c.1190 and c.1195, probably by Ralph Moulton: land granted by Ralph de Moulton, sub-tenant of Ralph de Lenham, who ratified the grant 1198; refounded 1537; dissolved 5 January 1540; granted to Robert Shelley 1548/9; converted into a house 1548, then labourers cottages; (EH)	The Blessed Virgin Mary and St John the Baptist ____________________; Egleston Abbey
Finchale Priory		Benedictine monks cell dependent on Durham; 1115 (or 1128) by Ranulf, Bishop of Durham who permitted St Godrick to establish his hermitage before 1170; becoming priory dependent on Durham 1196; confirmed to Durham by Hugh Pudsey, Bishop of Durham; dissolved 1538; granted to the Dean and Chapter of Durham 1534/5; (EH)	The Blessed Virgin Mary and St John the Baptist St John the Baptist and St Godric
Gateshead House		monks founded before 653; apparently abandoned when monks left for Ireland	
Hartlepool — St Hilda's Monastery		probably monks and nuns founded c.640 by Hieu, an Irishwoman (possibly St Bega) placed in charge by St Aidan destroyed 800?	St Hilda's Monastery
Hartlepool Greyfriars		Franciscan Friars Minor, Conventual (under the Custody of Newcastle) transferred from Durham, before 1240; dissolved 1538	
Hartlepool Friary?		Dominican Friars probably copyist's error ref. to Franciscan Friary (see immediately above)	
Haswell Grange		Benedictine monks endowment — possibly from Gisborough, Yorkshire; transferred to Baxterwood after 1180, probably prior to any buildings being erected; becoming a grange under Finchale	
Jarrow Priory	Historical county location. See entry under Tyne and Wear		
Jarrow Friar?	Historical county location. See entry under Tyne and Wear		
Neasham Priory		Benedictine nuns founded before 1156 (before 1163) purportedly by Lord Dacres; dissolved 1539–40; granted to James Lawson 1540/1; house named 'Neasham Abbey' built near site 19th century	St Mary ____________________; Nesham Priory; Nesseham Priory
Norton Monastery?		St Mary's Church incorporates remnants of a church built c.1000 — no reference of pre-Conquest community, but size suggests more than a parochial church; granted to St Cuthbert's, then to Chester-le-Street Cathedral	
Owton Priory		Gilbertine Canons charter confirming founded 1204 by Alan de Wilton, probably never established (though possibly a grange at Owton Grange nr Brierton)	St Mary ____________________; Oveton in Hartness Priory;Owton in Harness Priory
Samford Priory?		Benedictine monks probably confused for Stamford Priory, Lincolnshire	
South Shields Monastery		Saxon monks and nuns founded 648 by St Aidan for St Hilda; Benedictine? nuns refounded? c.686; destroyed ? 865–75	Wherhale Monastery?; Wyrale Monastery
Wearmouth Abbey	Historical county location until Tune and Wear created in 1974. See List of monastic houses in Tyne and Wear		

Return to top of page

=== Essex ===
(For references and location detail see List of monastic houses in Essex)

Foundation	Image	Communities & provenance	Formal name or dedication & alternative names
Assandun Minster^{~(/+)}		monastic or secular community founded 1020 by Canute; usually identified as Ashingdon, but also Hadstock	Ashingdon Minster?; possibly Hadstock Minster (Ashdon beside Hadstock)
Bedemans Berg Priory		hermitage founded before 1135 (during the reign of Henry I); Benedictine monks cell dependent on Colchester founded before 1135; dissolved 1536	dedication unknown
Beeleigh Abbey ^		Premonstratensian Canons transferred from Neasham via Parndon 1180; founded before 1172 at Parndon by Robert Mantell; dissolved 1536; granted to Sir John Gate 1540/1; remains now incorporated into private house without public access	Abbey Church of the Blessed Virgin Mary and Saint Nicholas, Beeleigh ____________________; Bileigh Abbey (originally Maldon Abbey)
Berden Priory ^{#}		Augustinian Canons Regular founded 12th century, probably by a member of the Rocheford family; apparently initially a hospital; dependent on Walden 1343; dissolved 1536; granted to Henry Parker 1537 (1538/9); site now occupied by mansion named 'Berden Priory'	The Priory Church of Saint John the Evangelist, Berden
Bicknacre Priory		hermitage of Jordan founded before 1175; Augustinian Canons Regular founded 1175 by Maurice Fitz Jeffery and Tiretai, Sheriff of Essex (or Maurice FitzGeoffrey of Tiltey, former Sheriff of Essex): converted to priory late 1175; dissolved 1507 on the death of the last prior, at which time no canons remained; granted to Henry Polsted 1539/40; granted to St Mary's Hospital without Bishopsgate, London	The Priory Church of Saint Mary and Saint John the Baptist, Bicknacre ____________________; Woodham Ferrers Priory; Woodham Priory; Wudeham Priory
Blackmore Priory ^{+}		Augustinian Canons Regular founded 1152-62 by Adam and Jordan de Samford; dissolved 1525 for Wolsey's college at Oxford; granted to John Smith 1540/1; priory church now in parochial use as the Parish Church of St Laurence	The Priory Church of Saint Lawrence, Blackmore ____________________; Jericho Priory
Bradwell Minster ^{+}		Roman Saxon Shore fort of Othona reused as monastery Celtic-style community founded c.654 by St Cedd; St Peter's Cathedral built at fort gatehouse; becoming a minster within Diocese of London shortly after October 664 (when Cedd died); believed destroyed in raids by the Danes 9th century; dependent on St Valery on the Somme 1068; sold to William of Wykeham 1391; in use as a barn 1750; restored as a chapel 1920; continuing as ecumenical place of worship and pilgrimage	St Cedd's Monastery; St Peter-on-the-Wall; Ithancester Monastery; Ythancester Monastery
Burstead Grange^{#}		Cistercian Monks grange or cell dependent on Stratford; during the flooding of Stratford the community transferred here until the re-edification of the abbey	
Castle Hedingham Priory		Benedictine nuns founded ?before 1190 by Aubrey de Vere, 1st Earl of Oxford (or by his wife Countess Lucia (Lucy), later the first prioress); dissolved 1536; granted to John, Earl of Oxford 1536/7	The Priory Church of the Blessed Virgin Mary, Saint James and the Holy Cross ____________________; Castlehedinhgam Priory; Heningham Priory
Chelmsford Blackfriars		Dominican Friars (under the Visitation of London) founded before 1277 (either at Chelmsford or originally at Fulsham); dissolved 1538; granted to Antony Bonvixi 1542/3	Chelmesford Friary
Coggeshall Abbey ^{+}		Savignac monks — from Savigny founded 3 August 1140 by King Stephen; Cistercian monks orders merged 17 September 1147; dissolved 5 February 1538; granted to Sir Thomas Seymour 1537/8; Little Coggeshall Abbey called 'Grange Barn'; site now occupied by a private house (re)built 1581 with limited public access; (NT)	The Abbey Church of Saint Mary and Saint John at Coggeshall ____________________; Coxhall Abbey; Coggeshale Abbey
Colchester Crutched Friary ^{#}		Crutched Friars founded before 1230-35 by William de Lanvelli; by 1392 became a secular hospital or free chapel; Crutched Friars refounded 1496; dissolved 1538; granted to Thomas, Lord Audley 1543/4; location established during excavation 1928	Hospital of the Holy Cross and Saint Helen
Colchester Greyfriars		Franciscan Friars Minor, Conventual (under the Custody of Cambridge) founded before 1237 by Robert, Lord FitzWalter (who became a friar); dissolved 1538; granted to Francis Jobson and Andrew Audley 1544/5	Colchester Greyfriars
Colchester — St Botolph's Priory		secular founded c.1093 by Ernulphus (later first prior); Augustinian Canons Regular refounded c.1100-6; dissolved 1536; granted to Sir Thomas Audley 1536/7; (EH)	The Priory Church of Saint Julian and Saint Botolph, Colchester (from before 1106)
Colchester — St John's Abbey ^{^}		Benedictine monks founded 1096/7 by Eudo, courtier of William the Conqueror; dissolved 1539; granted to John, Earl of Warwick 1547/8; (EH)	The Abbey Church of Saint John the Baptist, Colchester ____________________; Colchester Abbey; Colchester Priory
Colne Minster		founded before 1045; subsequently site of Earl's Colne Priory	
Cressing Preceptory		Knights Templar founded 1136 (1150) by King Stephen: donor, Maud (Matilda), queen of Stephen; Knights Hospitaller after 1312; dissolved after 1381: plundered during peasants' revolt; private farm 1515; granted to Sir W. Hughes, Kt. 1543/4; passed to Sir John Smyth and his family; 'The Granary' built 1623	Cressing Temple
Earl's Colne Priory		Benedictine monks dependent on Abingdon, Berkshire (Oxfordshire) founded before/c.1107 by Albericus de Vere (later a monk there) with consent of Henry I and Maurice, Bishop of London; on or near the site of an earlier minster extant 1045; practically independent from 1311; dissolved 1536; granted to John, Earl of Oxford 1536/7; 17th-century house built on site, incorporated into 1865 house currently on site	Earls Colne Priory; Monks Colne Priory; Colne Priory; Colum Priory; Colun Priory
Frating Abbey			
Hadstock Minster?		Church of St Botolph, site of important late-Anglo-Saxon church, belonging to Ely, identified by some as Assunden Minster built c.1020 by Canute	
Halstead Cell		Benedictine monks founded late 11th century (during the reign of William the Conqueror) by Ingelrica, wife of Ranulf Peverell; dissolved; granted to Giles Leigh 1537/8	Halstede Cell
Hatfield Broad Oak Priory ^{+}		Benedictine monks alien house: cell dependent on St-Melaine, Rennes; founded c.1135 by Aubrey de Vere, father of the 1st Earl of Oxford; dissolved 1534; granted to Sir Edward North 1543	The Priory Church of Saint Mary and Saint Melaine, Hatfield Broad Oak ____________________; Hatfield Regis Priory; Hatfield Broadoak Priory
Hatfield Peverel Priory ^{+}		Benedictine monks secular college founded before 1087; converted into priory as a cell of St Albans by William Peverel before 1100; dissolved 1536; priory church in parochial use as the Parish Church of St Andrew	The Priory Church of Saint Mary the Virgin, Hatfield Peverel
Hockley		alternative possible location of Assandun Minster	
Latton Priory ^		Augustinian Canons Regular founded before 1292; abandoned 1534; granted to Sir Henry Parker 1536/7 remains now incorporated into farm buildings	The Priory Church of Saint John the Baptist, Latton
Leez Priory ^{#}		Augustinian Canons Regular founded before 1200 (13th century) by Sir Ralph Gernoun; dissolved 1536; granted to Sir Richard Rich 1536; site now occupied by 16th-century mansion named 'Leez Priory'	Leighs Priory; Leigh Priory; Little Leighs Priory
Little Dunmow Priory ^{+}		Augustinian Canons Regular founded 1106 (1104) by Lady Juga; dissolved 1536; granted to Robert, Earl of Sussex 1536/7; part of conventual church now in parochial use as the Parish Church of St Mary	Dunmow Parva Priory
Little Horkesley Priory		Cluniac monks alien house: daughter house of Thetford, Norfolk (dependent on Lewes, Sussex) founded before 1127 by Robert Fitz Godebald (Robert of Horkesley) and his wife Beatrice; became denizen: independent from 1376; dissolved 1525; church destroyed by bombing in 1940	The Priory Church of Saint Peter, Horkesley ____________________; Horkesley Priory; Horkesley Parva Priory
Little Maplestead Preceptory		Knights Hospitaller probably founded ?before 1186 by Juliana, daughter and heiress of Robert Dorsnell; dissolved c.1463; granted to George Harper	The Church of Saint John the Baptist, Maplestead ____________________; Maplestead Preceptory; Maplestead Commandery
Maldon Whitefriars		Carmelite Friars founded 1293 (14th century) by Richard Gravesend, Bishop of London, and Richard Isleham, rector of South Hanningfield; dissolved 1538; granted to George Duke and John Sterr 1544/5	
Panfield Priory		Augustinian Canons Regular alien house: dependent on St-Etienne, Caen; founded 1069/70 (1070–77) by Waleran Fitz Ranulph; dissolved 1413 (1414); granted to Sir Giles Caple 1538/9	Paunsfield Priory
Parndon Abbey ^{#}		Premonstratensian Canons Regular — from Newhouse founded before 1172 by Robert Mantell; transferred to Beeleigh 1180; traditional site now occupied by buildings of Harlow Newton Golf Club	Abbey Church of Saint Mary and Saint Nicholas, Great Parndon ____________________; Great Parndon Abbey
Prittlewell Priory ^, Southend-on-Sea		Cluniac monks alien house: dependent on Lewes, Sussex; founded between 1086 and 1121 by Robert Fitz Swain; became denizen: independent from sometime between 1351 and 1374; dissolved 1536; granted to Thomas Audley 1537/8; granted to Sir Richard Rich 1551; acquired by the Earl of Nottingham 1678; then the Scratton family; sold by Daniel Scratton 19th century; bought by Robert Jones 1917; given to Southend Borough 1920; site now within public Priory Park, now in ownership of Southend Corporation	The Priory Church of Saint Mary, Prittlewell
St Osyth's Abbey ^		Augustinian Canons Regular founded before 1118 by Richard de Belmeis, Bishop of London and St Osyth, on the site of an earlier Saxon nunnery, established as Priory raised to Abbey status; dissolved; granted to Thomas, Lord Cromwell 1539/40 then to Sir Thomas Darey 1551/2; after reformation incorporated into a mansion; now in private ownership with public access	The Abbey Church of Saint Osyth, Saint Osyths ____________________; St Osyth's Priory; Chich Abbey
Southminster		Saxon minster	
Stansgate Priory		Cluniac monks alien house: cell dependent on Lewes, Sussex; founded 1122 by the predecessors of Lewes Priory; became denizen: independent from sometime between 1351 and 1374; in parochial use as the parish church for Steeple until closure 9 February 1525; dissolved 1525; granted to Cardinal's College Oxford; granted to the Hospital of St John of Jerusalem 1531; sold to Edmund Mordaut 1544	St Mary Magalen ____________________; Stanesgate Priory
Takeley Priory		Benedictine monks alien house: dependent on St Valery, Picardy; founded 1066–86; dissolved c.1391; now in grounds of Warish Hall	The Priory Church of Saint Valery, Takeley
Thoby Priory		Augustinian Canons Regular founded 1141-51 by Michael Capra, his wife and son; dissolved 1525; granted to Sir Richard Page, Kt. 1530/1; granted to Wolsey's college at Oxford	Thobey Priory; Ginges Priory
Thremhall Priory		Augustinian Canons Regular founded c.1150 (11th century or mid-12th century) by Gilbert de Monefixo; dissolved 1536; granted to John Carey 1536/7; site now occupied by a modern house	The Priory Church of Saint James the Apostle, Thremhall
Tilbury Monastery		Saxon monastery founded c.654 (630) by St Cedd; probably destroyed in raids by the Danes 9th century	
Tilty Abbey ^{+}		Cistercian monks founded 1153 by Robert Ferrers, Earl of Derby and Maurice FitzJeffery; dissolved 1536; granted to Thomas Lord Audley 1543/4; church now in parochial use	Tiltey Abbey
Tiptree Priory		Augustinian Canons Regular founded 12th century by Ralph de Munchensi dissolved; 16th-century house built on site	The Priory Church of Saint Mary and Saint Nicholas, Tiptree
Tolleshunt Major Grange			
Tolleshunt Knights — St John's Monastery *		Orthodox monks and nuns founded 1959; extant	Monastery of John the Baptist (1959) Patriarchal Monastery of St John the Baptist (1965) Patriarchal Stavropegic Monastery of St John the Baptist
Walden Abbey ^		Benedictine monks founded 1136 by Jeffrey (Geoffrey de) Mandevil[le], Earl of Essex; raised to abbey status 1190; dissolved 1538; granted to Sir Thomas Audley 1538; site now occupied by Audley End House and St. Mark's College	The Priory Church of Saint Mary and Saint James the Apostle, Walden The Abbey Church of Saint Mary and Saint James the Apostle, Walden ____________________; Saffron Walden Abbey; Little Walden Abbey; Walden Priory
Waltham Abbey ^{+}		secular canons founded ?1016-1035 (during the reign of Canute); refounded before c.1060 by Earl Harold; Augustinian Canons Regular founded 1177 by Henry II; dissolved 23 March 1540; granted to Sir Antony Deny part of church now in use as parish church	Holy Cross
West Mersea Priory		Benedictine monks alien house: dependent on St Ouen, Rouen; founded c.1046(?) by Edward the Confessor; dissolved 1400; granted to Higham Ferrer's collegiate church 1426; granted to Robert Dacres, Esq. 1542/3; conventual church now in parochial use as parish church of SS Peter & Paul	The Priory Church of Saint Peter and Saint Paul, Mersea ____________________; Mercy Priory; West Meresey Priory
Witham Preceptory		founded 1138–48, manor granted by King Stephen, his wife Matilda and son Eustace of Boulogne; dissolved before 1200(?), apparently united with Cressing and retained as a manor	
Wix Priory^{+}		Benedictine nuns founded 1123-33 by Walter and Alexander Mascherell; dissolved 1525; site now occupied by Abbey Farmhouse blocked arches of priory church form north wall of the church of St Mary The Virgin	The Priory Church of Saint Mary, Wix ____________________; Wickes Priory; Wikes Priory; Sopwick Priory

Return to top of page

=== Gloucestershire ===
(For references and location detail see List of monastic houses in Gloucestershire)

Foundation	Image	Communities & provenance	Formal name or dedication & alternative names
Beckford Priory	Historical county location. See entry under Worcestershire		
Berkeley Abbey		nuns founded before 807; destroyed before 1051 secular collegiate founded before 1066 (1019–1053) by Earl Godwin; dissolved c.1135 or later (after 1338); granted to Reading, Berkshire; current parochial church of St Mary possibly on site of minster or a property of the minster	Berkeley Minster ____________________ possibly Oldminster
Bishop's Cleeve		minster and church of St Michael granted by Offa and Ealdred 768–79; apparently annexed to the bishop or church of Worcester before 888	
Blockley Monastery		Saxon monastery founded before?855; granted to Ealhun, Bishop of Worcester by Burhred, King of Mercia 855	
Boxwell Priory		Benedictine nuns possibly destroyed in raids by the Danes	
Brimpsfield Priory		Benedictine monks founded before 1100; alien house: (non-conventual: grange?), dependent on St Wandrille, Fontenay; dissolved 1414 (before 1441); granted to Eton College, then to Windsor	Brimpsfield Grange
Cheltenham Minster		Anglo-Saxon minster here from 8th century onwards which was a monasterium or collegiate church as opposed to a monastery. Not to be confused with the more recent Cheltenham Minster, where St Mary's Parish Church was redesignated a Minster by the Bishop of Gloucester on Sunday 3 February 2013. Reference to minster 803 founded before 803 (c.770: apparently extant for 30 years); absorbed by Worcester ? before 890	
Cirencester Abbey		Saxon minster — secular college founded before 839 (during the reign of Egbert, King of Wessex) by Alwin; Augustinian Canons Regular founded (1117-) 1131 by Henry I; dissolved 19 December 1539; granted to Sir Thomas Seymour 1547; granted to Richard Masters 1563/4; site now within a public park; house named 'Abbey House' built on site	The Blessed Virgin Mary
Daylesford Monastery		founded 718 (? 727) by Begia (Baegia), land granted by Æthelbald, King of Mercia; granted to Worcester by Beorhtwulf 841; later claimed by Evesham dissolved	Daeglesford Priory
Deerhurst Abbey ^{+}		Saxon minster founded late-7th century; Benedictine? monks founded after 715 purportedly by Dodo (co-founder of Tewkesbury); destroyed? c.878; Benedictine monks rebuilt/(re)founded c.970 by St Oswald; destroyed c.975; alien house: dependent on St-Denis rebuilt before 1056, purportedly by Edward the Confessor, who granted it to St-Denis c.1059 — alien priory; became denizen: independent from 1443; granted to Eton College c.1447; restored to St Denis, for English monks 1461; secular chaplain without monks 1467; granted as cell to Tewkesbury; dissolved 1540; conventual church in parochial use as the Parish Church of St Mary	St Mary the Virgin St Mary the Virgin and St Denis ____________________; Derehures Abbey
Farmcote Grange		Cistercian monks grange of Hailes Abbey	
Flaxley Abbey ^{+}		Cistercian monks daughter house of Bordesley, Worcestershire founded 30 September 1151 by Roger, Earl of Hereford; dissolved 1536–7; granted to Sir Anthony Kingston 1544/5; remains now incorporated into a private house without public access	The Blessed Virgin Mary ____________________; Flexley Abbey; Dene Abbey
Gloucester Blackfriars		Dominican Friars (under the Visitation of Oxford) founded 1239 (before 1241) by Sir Stephen de Hermshall (or by Henry III) and consecrated 1284; dissolved 1538; granted to Thomas Bell 1539/40, who made it a drapering house	
Gloucester Greyfriars		Franciscan Friars Minor, Conventual (under the Custody of Bristol) founded before 1230 (1231), granted by Lord Berkley, under the guidance of Agnellus of Pisa, with timber provided by Henry III; dissolved 1538; granted to John Jennings 1543/4; church converted into a brewery	
Gloucester Whitefriars ^{#}		Carmelite Friars founded before 1268 (during the reign of Henry III) purportedly by Queen Eleanor, Sir Thomas Gifford and Sir Thomas Berkley; dissolved c.25 July 1538; granted to Richard Andrews and Nicholas Temple 1543/4	
Gloucester Cathedral Abbey ^{+}		Benedictine monks and nuns — double house founded before 679 (c.681) by Wulfhere, King of Mercia and his brother and successor Æthelred; destroyed in raids by the Danes after 767; secular canons minster founded before 823 (c.823-5); Benedictine monks founded c1022; Benedictine monks refounded c.1058; dissolved 2 January 1540; granted to the Bishop and officers of Gloucester; conventual church becoming an episcopal diocesan cathedral founded 1541; extant	The Abbey Church of Saint Peter, Gloucester The Cathedral Church of Saint Peter and the Holy and Indivisible Trinity in Gloucester (1541)
St Oswald's Priory, Gloucester		church of secular canons traditionally founded 660 by a son of Penda of Mercia; Augustinian Canons Regular founded 890s/refounded 909 by Æthelflæd/Æthelflæda and her husband Æthelred, ealdorman of Mercia; founded before 1153 as a priory by Henry Murdac, Archbishop of York; granted to John Jennings 1539/40; subsequently in parochial use as the Parish Church of St Catherine; destroyed 1643	St Oswald, King and Martyr
Hailes Abbey		Cistercian monks — from Beaulieu, Hampshire founded 17 July 1246 (1245) by Richard, Earl of Cornwall; dissolved 24 December 1539; granted to Sir Thomas Seymour 1547; granted to William, Marquis of Northampton 1550; (NT)	The Blessed Virgin Mary ____________________; Hayles Abbey; Tray Abbey
Hatherop Priory		Carthusian Monks founded 1222 transferred to Hinton 1227–32	
Hazleton Abbey		Cistercian monks daughter house of Tintern, Monmouthshire; (community founded at Kingswood earlier site 7 September 1139); transferred from Kingswood c.1149-50; dissolved c.1150-4; transferred to Tetbury; (EH)	The Blessed Virgin Mary
Horsley Priory ^		Benedictine monks alien house: cell dependent on Troarn; founded between 1066 and 1087 (during the reign of William the Conqueror) by Roger, Earl of Shrewsbury; Augustinian Canons Regular became denizen: cell granted to Bruton 1260; vicarage 1380; dissolved; granted to Sir Walter Denys of Dyrham 1553; a prison late-18th century; 19th century parish church of St Mary now occupies the site or an area to the north; other monastic buildings possibly currently in use as a hotel	dedication unknown ____________________; Horkeslegh Priory
Kingswood Abbey, earlier site		Cistercian Monks — from Tintern, Monmouthshire daughter house of Tintern; founded 7 September 1139 by William de Berkeley; refounded 1164-70 on new site; transferred to Hazleton 1149–50; this site retained as a grange; dissolved 1 February 1538 and demolished; gatehouse remains; (EH)	Kingswood Grange
Kingswood Abbey		Cistercian Monks — from Tintern, Monmouthshire (community founded at Kingswood earlier site 7 September 1139); transferred from Tetbury c.1164-70; dissolved 1 February 1538	
Kinley Priory		purportedly an ancient priory, lands seized by William the Conqueror	Kinline Priory
Lechlade Priory		Augustinian Canons Regular founded 13th century by Richard, Earl of Cornwall	The Priory Church of Saint John the Baptist, Lechlade ____________________; Lechelade Priory
Leonard Stanley Priory ^{+}		Benedictine monks founded c.1130 by Roger de Berkeley II; Augustinian Canons Regular confirmed to Gloucester Abbey 1146; dissolved 1538; granted to Sir Anthony Kingston church now in parochial use	The Priory Church of Saint Leonard of Stanley ____________________; Stanley St Leonard Priory; Stanley Priory
Llanthony Secunda Priory		Augustinian Canons Regular — from Llanthony, Wales daughter house of Llanthony founded 1136 at the instance of Robert, Bishop of Gloucester on a site granted by Miles (Milo) of Gloucester, Earl of Hereford; built by the prior and canons at Llanthony Priory; dissolved 1538; granted to Sir Arthur Porter 1540/1	The Priory Church of the Blessed Virgin Mary; Lantony Priory; Lanthony Priory
Minchinhampton Priory		Benedictine nuns alien house: dependent on Holy Trinity, Caen; probably a grange: no evidence of nuns resident; granted to the nuns (or minchins) of Holy Trinity, Caen 1082 by William the Conqueror; leased before 1192; forfeit 14th century; reverted to the Crown 1414; granted to Syon Abbey 1424; granted to Andrews, Lord Windsor 1542/3;	Minchin Hampton Priory
Minsterworth		Saxon minster	
Newent Priory		Benedictine monks alien house: dependent on Cormeilles Priory, Normandy; founded before 1086 by William fitz Osbern; dissolved 1411 by Henry IV; granted to Fotheringay College; granted to Sir Richard Lee 1547; St Mary's Parish church possibly the Priory Church	The Blessed Virgin Mary ____________________; Noent Priory; Newenton Priory
Poulton Priory		chantry chapel founded 1348 by Sir Thomas Seymour; Gilbertine Canons founded 1350; dissolved 1539; conventual church becoming the parish church demolished and replaced 1873; monastic remains incorporated into a wall at Priory Farm on site	The Priory Church of Saint Mary, Poulton
Prinknash Abbey *		Benedictine monks founded 1928 at St Peter's Grange; transferred to new abbey 1972 (see immediately below); transferred back to St Peter's Grange 29 June 2008; extant	
Prinknash Abbey — former site		Benedictine monks (community founded 1928 at St Peter's Grange); transferred here 1972; transferred back to St Peter's Grange 29 June 2008 (see immediately above)	
Quenington Preceptory		Knights Hospitaller founded between 1144 and 1162 by Walter, the first Prior of the Order in England by the bounty of Agnes de Lacy and her daughter; dissolved 1540; granted to Sir Richard Morisine and Sir Anthony Kingston 1545/6; demolished 17th century; site now occupied by Quenington House	Queinington Preceptory
St Briavels Chantry		hermitage Cistercian monks chantry dependent on Grace Dieu; founded c.1361, granted to Grace Dieu; dissolution unknown	
Temple Guiting Preceptory		Knights Templar founded c.1150, lands granted by Gilbert de Lacy and Roger de Waterville; benefactors included Roger, Earl of Hereford, and Roger d'Oilly; dissolved 1308–1311; possibly in ownership of Knights Hospitallers after 1338, but neither used as preceptory or camera	Guiting Preceptory
Temple Guiting Grange		possible Knights Templars grange of Temple Guiting Preceptory	
Tetbury Monastery		Saxon monastery founded before 680; land granted by King Æthelred of Mercia; site possibly near current after-medieval parish church of St Mary Magdalene (built on the site of a medieval church)	Tettan Monastery
Tetbury Abbey		Cistercian monks (community founded at Kingswood earlier site 7 September 1139); transferred from Hazleton c.1150-4 (1148–54); site found to be unsuitable; transferred to Kingswood c.1164-70; monastic remains apparently incorporated into current residences in Tetbury	The Blessed Virgin Mary
Tewkesbury Abbey ^{+}		hermitage of Theokus; Benedictine? monks cell dependent on Cranborne; founded c.715 by Dodo, Saxon lord; destroyed? in raids by the Danes 9th century; cell refounded c.980; enlarged by Robert RitzHaimon 1102; transferred from Cranborne 1102; raised to abbey status 1102; dissolved 9 January 1540; granted to Thomas Strowde, Walter Erie and James Paget 1544/5; now in parochial use	The Abbey Church of the Blessed Virgin Mary, Tewkesbury ____________________; Theokesbury Abbey
Twyinging Monastery		Saxon monastery founded before c.770 (during(?) the tenure of Mildred, Bishop of Worcester); granted to Worcester c.800 or 814	Bituinaeum Monastery; Ad Tuueoneaam
Winchcombe Nunnery		nuns founded 787 by Offa; Benedictine foundation built on site (see immediately below)	
Winchcombe Abbey		Benedictine monks founded 798 by King Ranulph on site of a nunnery (see immediately above); secular founded 9th century?; raised to abbey status c.969; destroyed by fire 1151; rebuilt and rededicated 1239; dissolved 1540; granted to Sir Thomas Seymour 1547/8; abbot's house used as parish workhouse; demolished 1815	The Abbey Church of St Mary and St Kenelm, Winchcombe ____________________; Winchcombe Priory; Winchelcombe Abbey
Withington Monastery		Saxon monastery founded between 674 and 704?: site granted to Abbess Dunna and her daughter Bucga for monastery by viceroy Oshere, with the consent of King Æthelred of Mercia dissolved after early-9th century	
Woodchester Monastery		religious house purportedly built by Gueta, wife of Earl Godwin	
Wotton under Edge Friary		Crutched Friars founded 1349(?) (1347): licence for foundation granted by Edward III 1349; dissolution unknown, probably after only a few years	
Yate Monastery		Saxon monastery founded 777-9?: land granted to St Mary's, Worcester between 777 and 779; dissolved after early-9th century; absorbed by Worcester c.888?	

Return to top of page

=== Greater London ===
(For references and location detail see List of monastic houses in Greater London)

Foundation	Image	Communities and provenance	Formal name or dedication and alternative names
Aldgate Priory		Augustinian Canons Regular founded 1107-8 by Queen Maud; conventual church rebuilt 1339 onwards; dilapidated since 1532; dissolved 1534; granted to Sir Thomas Audley, Speaker of the House of Commons 1531/2; largely demolished thereafter	Christchurch, Aldgate
Aldgate Abbey		Franciscan nuns founded 1293-4 by Edmund, Earl of Lancaster, confirmed by his brother Edward I; dissolved March 1539;	The Abbey Church of the Grace of the Blessed Virgin Mary and Saint Francis, without Aldgate ____________________; The Minories, London; Holy Trinity, Minories
Barking Abbey		Benedictine? nuns and monks — double house founded c.666 by St Erkenwald son of Anna, King of the East Angles; destroyed in raids by the Danes 870; refounded 946-951; Benedictine nuns refounded 965-75 by King Edgar and St Dunstan dissolved 14 November 1539; granted to Edward, Lord Clinton 1551/2	St Mary St Mary and St Ethelburgha ____________________; Berking Abbey; Bedenham Abbey
Bentley Priory		Augustinian Canons Regular founded 1171 by Ranulf de Glanville; dissolved before 1532; house named 'The Priory' possibly built on site: formerly in use as a girls' school, then a hotel; now in ownership of R.A.F. Bentley Priory	The Priory Church of Saint Mary Magdalen, Bentley
Bermondsey Minster		Saxon monastery founded not earlier than under Pope Constantine I (708-715) nothing further known about its history — possibly destroyed in raids by the Danes 9th century and succeeded by a new minster at Southwark	
Bermondsey Abbey		Cluniac monks alien house: dependent on La Charité; priory founded 1082 by Alvin (Aylwin) Child, citizen of London (first monks arrived 1089); became denizen: independent from 1381; raised to abbey status 1399 by order of the Pope; dissolved 1 January 1538; granted to Sir Richard Southwell 1541/2; and demolished soon after	St Saviour
Brockley Abbey		Premonstratensian Canons daughter house of Sulby, Northamptonshire; founded before 1182 by Countess Juliana and her seneschal Michael of Thornham; dissolved 1199–1208; transferred to Bayham, (East) Sussex c.1180	The Abbey Church of the Blessed Virgin Mary, Brockley
Bromley-by-Bow Priory		Benedictine nuns founded before 1122; dissolved 1536	Bromley Priory; Stratford-at-Bow Priory; Stratford-by-Bow Priory
Clerkenwell Priory		Knights Hospitaller founded c.1144 (or c.1100 by Jordan Briset, Baron, and his wife Muriel); dissolved 1540; the tower was blown up by Protector Somerset, much of the material used to build Somerset House	St John's Clerkenwell
Clerkenwell Priory (Augustinian)		Augustinian Canonesses founded 1100 by Robert, Priest, or c.1144 by Jordan FitzRalph (Briset); also given as Benedictine nuns dissolved c.1539; granted to Walter Hanley and John Williams, Knight 1545/6	The Priory Church of Saint Mary de Fonte The Priory Church of Saint Mary of the Assumption
Ealing Abbey *		Benedictine monks — from Downside, Somerset founded 1897; priory 1916; raised to abbey status 1955; extant	The Abbey Church of Saint Benedict, Ealing
Eastminster Abbey		Cistercian monks daughter house of Beaulieu, Hampshire; founded 20 March 1350 by Edward III; dissolved 1538; granted to Sir Arthur Darcy 1542/3	New Abbey; The Abbey of St Mary de Graciis; St Mary Graces Abbey
Elsing Spital Priory		secular college (community founded at London within Cripplegate before 1329) transferred here: founded 1329 by William Elsing; nuns conventual hospital founded 1331; chapel for priory and hospital built 1332; Augustinian Canons Regular conventual hospital; founded 1340; granted to John Williams, Master of the King's Jewels 1539/40; destroyed by fire 24 December 1539/40; priory church in parochial use from dissolution; demolished 1923	Elsing Spittle Priory; Priory and Hospital of St Mary-within-Cripplegate; Church of St Alphage, London Wall
Feltham Priory		Anglican Benedictine nuns founded 24 June 1868 by Father Ignatius; transferred to Twickenham	SS Mary and Scholastica ____________________; Feltham Nunnery
Greenwich Blackfriars		Dominican Friars founded 1376 by Edward III and Sir John Norbury; dissolved; refounded by Queen Mary; dissolved by Elizabeth I	
Greenwich Greyfriars ^{#}		Observant Franciscan Friars founded 1482: permission granted by the Pope to Edward IV, established 1485; suppressed for rejection of papal authority 1534; Franciscan Friars Minor, Conventual (under the Custody of London) refounded 1534; dissolved 1538; Observant Franciscan Friars refounded 1555; dissolved 1559; demolished; north-west wing of hospital currently stands on site	
Haliwell Priory		Augustinian Canonesses founded before 1127 (before 1150(?)) by Robert fitz Gelran (Fitzmore), canon of St Paul's; benefacted by Richard Belmeis, Bishop of London; also given as Benedictine nuns dissolved c.1539; granted to William Webb 1544/5	The Priory Church of Saint John the Baptist, Holywell ____________________; Holywell Priory; Holywell Nunnery, Shorditch
Hampton Cell then, later, Hampton Preceptory		Sisters of St John of Jerusalem founded before 1180; transferred to Sisters of St John Priory, Buckland, Somerset c.1180	
Hampton Cell then, later, Hampton Preceptory		Knights Hospitaller founded before 1180(?); manor procured by Hospitallers 1237; referred to as a camera 1338; later guest house; leased out 1505; dissolved 1338; lands were leased to the royal courtier Giles Daubeney 1494, who built private house; demolished 1514; 99-year lease obtained from the Hospitallers by Wolsey June 1514; Hampton Court built on site	
Harmondsworth Priory		Benedictine monks alien house: cell(?) dependent on St-Catherine-du-Mont, Rouen; founded between 1066 and 1087 (during the reign of William the Conqueror); dissolved ?before 1391; granted to Winchester College; granted to Sir William Paget 1547/8	
Hornchurch Priory ^{+}		Augustinian Canons alien house: cell dependent on the Hospital of St Nicholas and St Bernard in Montjoux, Savoy; founded 1158/9 by Henry II; dissolved November 1390; granted to New College, Oxford 1391;	Saint Nicholas and Saint Bernard
Hounslow Priory		hospital founded before 1200; Trinitarians founded after 1224 (possibly 1252); dissolved 1538; granted to William, Lord Windsor; Parish Church of the Holy Trinity built on site 1828	The Holy Trinity ____________________; Hounslow Friary
Kilburn Priory		anchoresses cell founded before/c.1130; Benedictine nuns founded 1139 (during the reign of Henry I) by the Convent of Westminster; possibly Augustinian Canonesses during existence — but began and ended as Benedictine; dissolved 1537 (1536); granted to John, Earl of Warwick 1547/8	Kylburn Nunnery
Lesnes Abbey		Augustinian Canons Regular — Arrouasian founded June 1178 by Richard de Luci, Justiciar of England; dissolved 1525; granted to Cardinal Wolsey's college at Oxford; granted to Sir Ralph Sadler 1536/7	The Abbey Church of Saint Thomas the Martyr, Lesnes ____________________; Westwood Abbey
Lewisham Priory		Benedictine monks alien house: cell dependent on St Peter, Gent; founded 11 September 918: granted by Elstrudis, Countess of Flanders and her sons Arnulf and Adelulf, confirmed by King Edgar August 964; confiscated and destroyed; restored 1044 by Edward the Confessor; dissolved 1414; granted to the Carthusians at Sheen by Henry V 1415	
London Areno Friars		Friars of St Mary de Areno founded 1267 by William Arnand, a knight of Henry III; ceased 1317 with the death of the last brother, Hugh of York (appears to be the same establishment as the London Pied Friars and Westminster Pied Friars)	
London Austin Friars		Augustinian Friars founded 1253 by Humphrey Bohun, Earl of Hereford and Essex; dissolved 1538; granted to John a Losco 1550, who founded preaching house for congregation of Walloon refugees; nave used as church, quire, transepts and tower demolished 1600; church destroyed by fire 1862; rebuilt 1863; bombed in 1940 during World War II; rebuilt 1950-6 as the Dutch Church, Austin Friars	
London Charterhouse ^, Charterhouse Square		secular college intended 1348; chapel built; founded by Sir Walter de Manny; Carthusian monks founded 1371; dissolved 1537; granted to Sir Thomas Audley 1544/5; almshouse and Charterhouse School founded by Thomas Sutton on the site 1622; which transferred to Godalming 1872; and that part of the site is now research facilities for the Barts and The London medical school	House of the Salutation of the Mother of God
London, Cornhill Greyfriars		Franciscan Friars Minor, Conventual (under the Custody of London) founded 1224: hired a house here after living for a number of days with the Dominicans at Holborn upon arriving in London; transferred to Newgate 1225	
London Crutched Friars		Crutched Friars founded before 1269; dissolved 1538	
London, Friars of the Sack, Aldersgate		Friars of the Sack founded 1257; transferred to Lothbury (see immediately below) before 1271–2	
London, Friars of the Sack, Lothbury		Friars of the Sack (community founded at Aldersgate (see immediately above) 1257); transferred here before 1271–1; abandoned 1305; chapel became a chantry	
London, Holborn Blackfriars		Dominican Friars founded before 1224 (probably 1221); transferred to Ludgate (see immediately below) after 1275	Monumenta Conventus Londinensis
London, Ludgate Blackfriars		Dominican Friars (community founded at Holborn (see immediately above) before 1224 (probably 1221)) transferred here after 1275; dissolved 12 November 1538; briefly refounded under Queen Mary at Smithfield	
London, Newgate Greyfriars		Franciscan Friars (under the Custody of London) (community founded at Cornhill 1224); transferred here 1225: John Iwyn, citizen of London, allowed them the use of land and property; school founded church completed 1327; dissolved 12 November 1538; granted to the City of London 1546/7; reused as Christ Hospital	
New Temple, London ^{+}		Knights Templar (community founded at earlier site (see immediately below) 1121); transferred here 1161; dissolved 1308–12; Knights Hospitaller transferred 1324; part leased to lawyers for use as a hostel; dissolved after 1540; leased to the Benches of the Inner and Middle Temple by James I 1609; restorations 19th century; church severely damaged in World War II in 1941; restored 1947–57	
London, Old Temple		Knights Templar founded 1121; transferred to new site (see immediately above) 1161	Camden Preceptory
London Pied Friars		Pied Friars (appears to be the same as London Areno Friars, and Westminster Pied Friars)	
London — St Dominic's Priory		Dominican Friars opened 1867, church completed 1882	The Priory of Our Holy Father St Dominic; Our Lady of the Rosary and Saint Dominic
London — St Helen's, Bishopsgate ^{+}		Benedictine nuns founded before 1216 by William fitz William(s), goldsmith; dissolved 25 November 1538; granted to Sir Richard Cromwell 1541/2; conventual buildings were acquired by the Leathersellers' Company 1543; conventual church now in parochial use as the Parish Church of St Helen, Bishopsgate; church restored 18th, 19th, 20th century; damaged by IRA bomb 10 April 1992; restored 1995–7	St Helen
London — St James Monkswell Chantry		Carthusian monks house or cell of the Abbot of Garendon; chantry(?), daughter house of Garendon, Leicestershire; founded 1341	
London, St Mary Spital		Augustinian Canons Regular conventual hospital or priory founded 1197 by Walter Fitz Ealdred land granted by Walter Brunus, citizen of London, and his wife Roisia; granted to Stephen Vaughan who made his home in the precinct	St Mary the Virgin ____________________; St Mary Spittle, without Bishopsgate; Domus Dei
London, St Mary of Bethlehem Friary		Augustinian Canons Regular — Order of Bethlehem conventual hospital; St Mary of Bethlehem Sisters founded 1247, land granted by Simon Fitz Mary to Godfrey, bishop of Bethlehem to founded a house of canons, brothers and sisters; hospital became attached to the founded before 1329; dissolved; hospital but was moved to Moorfields 1675-6 and then to the South side of the Thames in 1814 (see Bethlem Royal Hospital)	The Bethlehem Hospital; Bedlam
London, St Thomas of Acon Hospital		Augustinian Canons Regular conventual hospital	
London, Smithfield Blackfriars		Dominican Friars briefly founded under Queen Mary	
London Whitefriars		Carmelite Friars founded 1247 by Sir Richard Grey; church built 1253; rebuilt mid-14th century dissolved 1538; granted to Richard Moresyne and William Butts 1540/1; frater, library and kitchen granted to the King's Armourer; Michael Drayton and Thomas Woodford, nephew of the playwright Thomas Lodge, converted the former refectory for use as The Whitefriars Theatre 1608 (or possibly 1606); theatre closed 1629	
London within Cripplegate (?)Priory		nuns(?)/conventual hospital founded before 1329; became dilapidated; abandoned 1329; transferred to Elsing	
Merton Priory		Augustinian Canons Regular founded 1114 (1117) by Gilbert Norman, Sheriff of Surrey; dissolved 1538; Merton Abbey Station built on site 19th century; site now occupied by shopping centre with purpose-built basement from which remains are visible	The Priory Church of Saint Mary, Merton The Priory Church of Saint Mary of Merton ____________________; Merton Abbey St Mary's Priory; St Mary of Merton
Moor Hall Preceptory		Knights Hospitaller founded apparently c.1176, granted by Beatrice de Bollers, widdow; apparently became a camera by 1338; dissolved 1338; chapel demolished 1960	Harefield Preceptory; Harefield Camera; Moor Hall Camera
Richmond Greyfriars ^{#}		Observant Franciscan Friars founded 1499 or 1500; dissolved 1534; probably passed to the Austin Friars; probably Augustinian Friars refounded 1534; dissolved 1536?	Richmond Austin Friars (1534-6); Sheen Friary
Ruislip Priory		Benedictine monks alien house: dependent Bec-Hellouin; founded (during the reign of William the Conqueror) land granted by Ernulph de Heding; conventual until after? c.1250; parcel of Ogbourne, Wiltshire 1291; dissolved 1404; granted to Ralph Sadler 1540/1; Manor Farm House built 16th century	Riselipp Priory
St Bartholomew's Priory ^{+}		Augustinian Canons Regular founded 1123, land obtained from Henry I by Roahere, formerly a minstrel at court; became a priory with a separate hospital; dissolved October 1539; granted to Lord Rich 1558/9; now St Bartholomew's Hospital, and priory church in parochial use	The Priory Church of St Bartholomew-the-Great, Smithfield
Sheen Priory		Carthusian monks founded c.1414 by Henry V; dissolved 1539; granted to Edward, Earl of Hertford 1540/1; restored 26 January 1557 by Queen Mary, under Maurice Chauncy of London (who became prior) dissolved by Elizabeth I	The Priory Church of Jesus of Bethlehem ____________________; Richmond Priory; Shene Priory
Sheen Whitefriars		Carmelite Friars founded c.1315; dissolved c.1318; community transferred by Edward II to his manor called the 'Palace of Beaufort' at Oxford 1317–8	
Southwark Cathedral Priory ^{+}		Saxon minster church pre-1066, allegedly built on the remains of an earlier nunnery; probably founded as a burghal minster either late in the reign of Alfred or earlier in the reign of Edward the Elder; probably succeeded the minster at Bermondsey; Augustinian Canons Regular (re)founded 1106; largely destroyed by fire 1212; subsequently rebuilt; dissolved 27 October 1539; granted to Sir Antony Brown 1544/5; episcopal diocesan cathedral founded 1 May 1905: see created for new diocese separated from Rochester; extant	The Priory Church of Saint Mary Overie, Southwark
Stratford Langthorne Abbey		Savignac monks founded 25 July 1135; Cistercian monks orders merged 17 September 1147; dissolved 1538	The Abbey Church of Saint Mary, Stratford Langthorne ____________________; West Ham Abbey
Stratford Friary *		Franciscan Friars Minor extant	
Syon Abbey		Bridgetine nuns founded 1431; dissolved 1539; 18th century house acquired	Charterhouse at Sheen
Tooting Priory		Benedictine monks alien house: dependent on Bec-Hellouin; manor held by Bec-Hellouin at the Domesday Survey; founded before 1086: granted by Richard de Tonbridge, Lord of Clare; dissolved before 1315(?); parcel of Ogbourne 1315; dissolved by Henry V 1414 and granted to his brother John, Duke of Bedford; on his death 14 September 1436, it passed to Henry VI who granted to John Ardern for ten years; granted to Eton College 1440	Tooting Bec Priory
Twickenham Abbey		Bridgetine nuns founded 1415 by Henry V (who laid the first stone 22 February and signed charter 3 March); transferred to Syon 1431	
Twickenham Priory		Anglican Benedictine nuns transferred from Feltham; transferred to West Malling, Kent	
Upminster		Saxon 'minster'; possibly on site now occupied by the Parish Church of St Laurence	
Westminster Abbey ^{+}		legendary very early foundation; possibly monastery founded c.616 (probably just a chapel or church) by Sebert on instruction by Bishop Mellitus; some evidence of monastery, possibly secular, founded before 785, destroyed? in raids by the Danes 871-2?, restored Benedictine monks founded c.960 (959); dissolved 16 January 1540; episcopal cathedral 1540–1550; restored 1556; dissolved 1559; collegiate church 1560; now in use as a royal peculiar	The Abbey Church of Saint Peter in Westminster
Westminster Pied Friars		Pied Friars (appears to be the same establishment as the London Areno Friars and London Pied Friars)	
Woodford Green Friary *		Franciscan Friars Minor extant	Friary and Parish of St Thomas of Canterbury

Return to top of page

=== Greater Manchester ===
For references or to add or amend any details or images, please refer to the individual article for each monastic house.

Foundation	Image	Communities & provenance	Formal name or dedication & alternative names
Gorton Monastery ^		Franciscan Friars; extant	The Church and Friary of St Francis
Kersal Priory		hermitage Cluniac monks alien house: cell, dependent on Lenton, Nottinghamshire; founded 1145-53: granted after 1143 by Ranulph 'de Gernon', Earl of Chester; became denizen: independent from 1392; dissolved 1538	St Leonard ____________________; Kershall Priory
Marland Grange ^{~}		Cistercian monks grange of Stanlow, Cheshire, then of Whalley; founded before 1212	
Warburton Priory ^{#}		Premonstratensian Canons cell, daughter house of Cockersand, Lancashire; founded c.1200 church of St Mary and St Werburgh granted to Cockersand by Adam of Dutton; abandoned before 1271	Warburton Cell

Return to top of page

=== Hampshire ===
(For references and location detail see List of monastic houses in Hampshire)

Foundation	Image	Communities and provenance	Formal name or dedication and alternative names
Alton Abbey *		Anglican Benedictine monks founded 1895; extant	The Abbey of Our Lady and Saint John
Andover Priory		Benedictine monks alien house: dependent on St-Florent-de-Saumur; founded before 1087, church of St Mary granted to St-Florent by William the Conqueror, confirmed by the Pope 1146; dissolved c.1414; alienated to Winchester College	St Peter Blessed Virgin Mary
Andwell Priory		Tironensian monks alien house: daughter of Tiron founded between 1100 and 1135 (during the reign of Henry I) by Adam de Port of Maplederwell; dedicated 1215/38 by John, Bishop of Ardfert (officiating for Peter des Roches, Bishop of Winchester); dissolved 1391; granted to Winchester College	The Blessed Virgin Mary (or St John the Baptist?)
Baddesley Preceptory ^{#}		Knights Hospitaller transferred from Godsfield Preceptory; Hospitallers manor and estate of Godsfield here before 1167; transferred here before/c.1355; dissolved 1540; granted to Sir Nicolas Trockmorton 1539/40; house named 'Baddesley Manor' built on site	North Baddesley Preceptory; South Badeisley Preceptory
Beaulieu Abbey ^		Cistercian monks transferred from Faringdon Abbey, Berkshire daughter of Citeaux; founded 2 November 1203 (1204) by John; dissolved 1538; granted to Thomas Wriothesley Esq. 1538/9; now part of Beaulieu Palace House, in private ownership with public access	The Abbey Church of Saint Mary, Beaulieu ____________________; Bellus Locus Regis; De Bello Loco Regis; (Royal Beaulieu); abbatia quae vocitatur Bellus Locus
Breamore Priory		Augustinian Canons Regular founded 1128-33 by Baldwin de Reveriis and his uncle Hugh; dissolved 1536; granted to Henry, Marquis of Exeter 1536/7; Elizabethan manor house (1536) on site	The Priory Church of the Holy Trinity, Saint Mary and Saint Michael, Breamore ____________________; Bromere Priory
Breamore Minster ?		large pre-Conquest church suggested to have been a minster 10th century — evidence lacking	St Mary
Damerham Monastery		Saxon monastery founded before 880–5; community mentioned in Alfred the Great's will; land granted to Glastonbury, Wessex (Somerset) after 944–6	
Eling Monastery ?		possible site of ancient monastery under Abbot Cimberth (Cynebert), (alternatively at Redbridge); founded c.680; strong evidence that the current Parish Church of St Mary, substantially restored 1863, was the pre-conquest minster, possibly Reodford/Redbridge	possibly Reodford Monastery; possibly Nursling Monastery
Ellingham Priory		Benedictine monks alien house: cell, dependent on St-Sauveur-le-Vicomte founded 1160, church of St Mary and land granted by William de Solariis to build a cell; dissolved 1414; granted to Eton College 1462	Church of Saint Mary Church of All Saints
Farnborough Abbey *		Premonstratensian Canons cell founded 1887; French Benedictine 1895; raised to abbey status 1903; English Benedictine cell of Prinknash Abbey, Gloucestershire 1947; priory 1969; independent community 1980; extant	The Abbey Church of Saint Michael the Archangel, Farnborough
Fordingbridge Preceptory ?		Knights Templar built 12th century on site of Saxon church; church owned by Templars, possible preceptory — lacking positive identification; transferred to Knights Hospitallers 1308–12; intact non-parochial chapel incorporated into present parochial church	
Godsfield Preceptory		Knights Hospitaller founded before/c.1171; transferred to North Baddesley 1355; chapel on site c.1360-70	
Hamble Priory		Tironensian monks alien house: daughter of Tiron founded between 1109 and 1140 by William Giffard, Bishop of Winchester; dissolved 1391; granted to Winchester College	Priory of St Andrew, Hamble ____________________; Hamble-en-le-rys; Hamblerice; Hamble-le-Rice
Hayling Priory		Benedictine monks alien house: daughter of Jumièges founded after/c.1067 ("by King William, and afterwards by King Henry I"), land granted by William the Conqueror; part of estate (possibly including church and conventual buildings) inundated by the sea 1324-5 and 1340; dissolved 1413; granted to Arundel College 1541/2; granted to the Carthusians at Sheen, Surrey (Greater London); site is now beneath the sea — a number of locations suggested as being the main site	Halling Priory; Hailing Priory
Marwell 'Priory'		Augustinian Canons Regular founded 13th century by Henry de Blois, Bishop of Winchester; secular college for four priests, of whom one was titled 'prior'; dissolved after 1540; granted to Sir Henry Seymore 1551	SS Stephen, Laurence, Vincent and Quintin, Martyrs ____________________; Merewell Priory; Merewelle Priory
Mottisfont Abbey ^		Augustinian Canons Regular founded 1201 (13th century) by William Brimere dissolved 1536; granted to William, Lord Sandys 1536/7; remains now incorporated into a mansion named 'Mottisfont Abbey' built 1538–40	The Priory Church of the Holy Trinity, Mottisfont ____________________; Mottisfont Priory; Motisfont Priory
Netley Abbey		Cistercian monks daughter of Beaulieu founded 25 July 1239, projected by Peter des Roches, Bishop of Winchester on land granted by him before 1238; co-founder with Henry III; dissolved 1536; granted to Sir William Paulet 1536/7; (EH)	The Abbey Church of the Blessed Virgin Mary and Saint Edward the Confessor, Netley ____________________; Locus Sancti Edwardi (Lieu-Saint-Edward); Nettely Abbey
Nursling Monastery ?		Benedictine monks founded 8th century by St Boniface; destroyed in raids by the Danes c.878; 'The Walls' reputedly the site of monastery; although argued that the monastery was at Romsey; inconclusive evidence of pre-Conquest foundation from excavations during 1982	possibly Redford Monastery; Reodford Monastery
Pamber Priory ^{+}		Benedictine monks alien house: daughter of St Vigor, Cerisy (Cerisy-le-Forêt); founded 1100 (c.1120-30); dissolved 1135; dissolved 1414; granted to St Julian's Hospital, Southampton; granted to Queen's College, Oxford 1446 and continues in that ownership; priory church extant	St Mary and St John the Baptist ____________________; Monk Sherborne Priory; Sherborne Priory
Portchester Priory ^{+}		Augustinian Canons Regular founded 1128-9(1133), by William de Pont de l'Arche(d'Arch), chamberlain and sheriff of Hampshire, with the assistance of Henry I within the walls of the castle; site soon proved unsuitable; transferred to Southwick c.1145; dissolved 7 April 1538; granted to John White 1538/9; priory church in parochial use as the Parish Church of St Mary	St Mary ____________________; Porchester Priory
Portsmouth Blackfriars	projected house for Dominican Friars (1225) establishment never implemented		
Redbridge Monastery		founded c.680; possible site of ancient monastery under Abbot Cimberth (Cynebert), though more likely at Eling	Reodford Monastery
Romsey Abbey ^{+}		nuns probably founded c.907 by Edward the Elder or by Ethelwold, Saxon nobleman Benedictine nuns refounded 967 by King Edgar; dissolved 1539; granted to John Bellow and R. Pigot 1546/7; church now in parochial use	The Abbey Church of Saint Mary and Saint Elfleda, Romsey ____________________; Rumesey Abbey
Sapalanda Monastery		possible monastery, possibly from Winchester Cathedral Priory	
Selborne Priory		Augustinian Canons Regular founded 1233–34 by Peter des Roches, Bishop of Winchester (charter dated 20 January 1233/4, confirmed by Pope Gregory IX September 1235); dissolved 1484: house financially and physically dilapidated; annexed by Magdalen College, Oxford 11 September 1484 (confirmed 1485)	Priory Church of the Blessed Virgin Mary
Southampton — Greyfriars		Franciscan Friars founded before 1235; Observant Franciscan Friars refounded 1498; dissolved 1534; Augustinian Friars founded 1534; dissolved 1538; granted to John Pollard 1544/5; granted to Arthur Darcy 1551	Southampton Austin Friars
Southampton — St Denys's Priory		Augustinian Canons Regular founded 1127 (1124) by Henry I; dissolved 1536; granted to Francis Dawtrey 1538/9	St Denis Priory; St Denys by Southampton Priory
St Leonard's Grange		Cistercian monks grange and chapel dependent on Beaulieu; founded 13th century	
Southwick Priory		Augustinian Canons Regular (community founded at Portchester c.1128-9 (or 1133)); transferred here 1145, built 1145-53 (indulgences granted by the Archbishop of Canterbury to establish the canons at Southwick); dissolved 7 April 1538	Our Lady of Southwick
Temple Southington Preceptory		Knights Templar founded before 1240; dissolved before 1308	Temple Preceptory; Sotherington Preceptory
Titchfield Abbey		Premonstratensian Canons — from Halesowen, Worcestershire (West Midlands) daughter of Halesowen; founded 1232-3 by Peter des Roches (Peter de Rupibis), Bishop of Winchester; dissolved December 1537; granted to Thomas Wriothesley 1537; converted into a mansion named 'Palace House' by 1542, much of which demolished 1781; (EH)	The Abbey Church of the Blessed Virgin Mary and Saint John the Evangelist, Titchfield ____________________; Tychfield Abbey
Ventnor Priory	Historical county location. See entry under Isle of Wight		
Wherwell Abbey ^{#}		Benedictine nuns founded c.986 by Elfrida, widow of King Edgar, probably on site of Saxon minster; dissolved 21 November 1539; country house named 'The Priory' built on site mid-18th century, immediately to the south-east of the abbey church	The Abbey Church of the Holy Cross and Saint Peter, Wherwell ____________________; Whrewell Abbey
Winchester — St Augustine's Friary, possible earlier site ^{~}		Augustinian Friars (under the Limit of Oxford) founded before 1300 possibly on a site outside the city wall; in 1342 the Pope instructed the Bishop of Winchester to allow the friars to move from their premises to a site they had procured within the city wall 1341; the Pope sanctioned the move in 1346 (see immediately below)	
Austin Friary, Winchester ^{~}		Augustinian Friars (under the Limit of Oxford) (community founded before 1300 possibly on a site outside the city wall (see immediately above)) transfer sanctioned by the Pope 1346; dissolved 1538; house named 'The Friary' built in the vicinity of the site	
Winchester Blackfriars		Dominican Friars (under the Visitation of London) founded c.1231 (before 1235); dissolved 1538	
Winchester Greyfriars		Franciscan Friars (under the Custody of London) founded 1237; dissolved 1538; granted 1543/4	St Francis
Carmelite Friary, Winchester		Carmelite Friars founded before 1268 (1278) by Peter, rector of St Helen's, Winchester; dissolved 1538	
Hyde Abbey		Benedictine monks (community founded at New Minster 901); transferred from New Minster, (see immediately below), 1110 (1109); dissolved 30 April 1539; granted to Richard Bethel 1545/6	New Minster
New Minster, Winchester		secular canons founded 901 by Edward the Elder, site granted by Alfred the Great; Benedictine monks refounded 964; transferred to new site at Hyde (see immediately above) 1110 (1109)	The New Minster
St. Mary's Abbey, Winchester ^{#}		Benedictine nuns founded c.902 (c.900 / 9th century) by Alfred the Great and his queen Ealhswith; completed before 908 by Edward the Elder refounded and rededicated 963 by Bishop Ethelwold; rededicated 1108; destroyed in the siege of Winchester; rebuilt 1141; dissolved 15 November 1539; granted to John Bello and John Broxholme 1546/7	St Mary ____________________; Nunnaminster Abbey; St Mary's Abbey
Priory of Saint Swithun		fictitious accounts of very early foundation; Saxon monastery built before 642-3 by King Cenwealh; Benedictine monks founded 648; episcopal diocesan cathedral founded c.662/3: see split from Dorchester; damaged in raids by the Danes 860 and 879; repaired; demolished 1093-4 when the East end of the new cathedral church was completed (see immediately below)	The Cathedral Church of the Holy Trinity, Saint Peter and Saint Paul in Winchester The Cathedral Church of the Holy Trinity, Saint Peter, Saint Paul and Saint Swithun in Winchester ____________________; Old Minster
Winchester Cathedral Priory ^{+}		secular canons founded c.942–1064: built 1079-1094 by Wakelin, Bishop of Winchester; Benedictine monks founded 964; dissolved 1539; episcopal diocesan cathedral founded 8 April 1093; extant	The Cathedral Church of the Holy Trinity, Saint Peter, Saint Paul and Saint Swithun in Winchester
Wintney Priory		Cistercian nuns founded before 1200 (during the reign of William the Conqueror) by the son of Peter Jeffrey; dissolved 1536; granted to Richard Hill, Esq., Sergeant of the King's Cellar 1538/9; 18th-century Wintney Farmhouse on site	Priory of the Blessed Virgin and St Mary Magdalene, Wintney ____________________; Winteney Priory

Return to top of page

=== Herefordshire ===
(For references and location detail see List of monastic houses in Herefordshire)

Foundation	Image	Communities & provenance	Formal name or dedication & alternative names
Aconbury Priory		Sisters of St John of Jerusalem with brethren founded 13th century (c.1200) by Margery (Margaret), wife of Walter de Lacy on a site granted by King John; with a hospital, and attached to the preceptory of Dinmore; Augustinian Canonesses refounded 1237 with Papal permission; dissolved 1539 (?); granted to Hugh de Harry 1541/2; priory church (restored by Sir George Gilbert Scott 1863) in parochial use as the Parish Church of Saint John until 1967	The Priory Church of the Holy Cross, Aconbury St John the Baptist ____________________; Acornbury Priory
Acton Beauchamp Monastery		grant of land 718 (727?) as "perpetual dwelling of servants of God", otherwise unknown	
Archenfield Monastery		founded before 914–917, when Cyfeiliog, 'Bishop of Archenfield' was captured by Norsemen	
Aymestrey Priory		Augustinian Canons Regular — Victorine transferred from Shobdon; founded c.1150(?); dissolution unknown: transferred to Wigmore	
Barton Priory?		Benedictine monks founded before 1199 (recorded by Gervase of Canterbury — possibly Brockbury (Colwall))	
Belmont Abbey *		Benedictine monks founded 1859; extant Roman Catholic priory-cathedral founded 1859 status raised to abbey-cathedral 1917; dissolved 1920; see transferred to St David's Cathedral, Cardiff	The Abbey Church of Saint Michael and All Angels, Belmont
Beodune Priory		Augustinian Canons Regular — Victorine transferred from Wigmore c.1155; founded c.1155(?); dissolution unknown; transferred to Shobdon after 1155?	Byton Priory?
Bosbury Preceptory		Knights Templar founded c.1217–1219 by William Marshall, Earl of Pembroke; dissolved 1308–12; Knights Hospitaller founded 1312; dissolved 1410; merged with Dinmore and Garway 1410; house named 'Temple Court' possibly built on site 18th century	Upleadon Preceptory
Cheleburne Priory?		Augustinian Canons Regular (possibly Chirbury Priory, Shropshire)	Chalborn Priory; possibly Pynkney Priory possibly Chirbury Priory
Clifford Priory ^		Cluniac monks alien house: dependent on Lewes, Sussex founded 1129-30 by Simon fitz Richard; became denizen: independent from sometime between 1351 and 1374; dissolved 1536; granted to William Herbert, Earl of Pembroke 1553; site occupied by Priory Farm, which probably incorporates monastic remains	The Blessed Virgin Mary
Colwall Priory		Benedictine monks cell dependent on Great Malvern, Worcestershire; founded before 1199; dissolved ?	Brockbury Priory
Craswall Priory		Grandmontine monks alien house: dependent on Grandmont; founded c.1225 by Walter de Lacy; dissolved 1462; granted to God's House College, Cambridge 1462	St Mary's Priory
Dinmore Monastery (?)		order and foundation unknown; small monastic community apparently existed prior to the arrival of the Knights (see immediately below)	
Dinmore Preceptory		Knights Hospitaller founded before 1189; chapel 14th century; dissolved before 1535: privately leased; granted to Sir Thomas Palmer in 1548; chapel restored 1886 by H F St John	Chapel of St John of Jerusalem; Dynmore Preceptory
Dore Abbey ^{+}, Abbey Dore		Cistercian monks — from Morimond founded 26 April 1147 by Robert Ewyas; dissolved 1537; granted to John Scudamore 1539/40; church restored 1633 and now in parochial use	Abbey Dore
Dulas Monastery		Benedictine monks purportedly founded here; transferred to Ewyas Harold	
Ewyas Harold Priory		Benedictine monks cell dependent on Gloucester; founded after 1100 by Harold son of Ralph of the Vexin: church of St Michael granted by Harold, Lord of Ewyas, purportedly first established at Dulas; dissolved 1358 monks withdrawn due to lack of revenue	St James and St Bartholomew
Flanesford Priory ^		Augustinian Canons Regular founded 1346/47 by Richard Talbot, 2nd Baron Talbot; dissolved 1537; granted to George, Earl of Shrewsbury 1538/39; converted into a farm; remains now incorporated into a private house	The Priory Church of Saint Mary the Virgin and Saint John the Baptist, Flanesford
Garway Preceptory		Knights Templar founded 1185-88: grant made by Henry II; dissolved 1308–12; Knights Hospitaller refounded after 1312; merged with Dinmore before 1489; dissolved before 1535 with Dinmore	
Garway Clas		Celtic monks — clas to 11th century?	
Hentland Monastery		Celtic monks purportedly founded 6th century by St Dubricius	
Hereford Cathedral Priory		secular episcopal diocesan cathedral founded 669 (680); extant; Benedictine monks — abbey? founded c.1025 built early 11th century; destroyed 1055; dissolved before 1066; rebuilt 12th century by Bishop Renhelm	The Cathedral Church of the Blessed Virgin Mary and Saint Ethelbert in Hereford
Saint Guthlac's Priory, Hereford		probable Saxon minster secular collegiate: St Guthlac's Collegiate Church founded before 1066; Benedictine monks — monastic church or chapel founded c.1101; united with Hereford priory; badly damaged in the Baron's War c.1143; and amalgamated with Hereford Priory 1143; transferred to new site outside the town (see immediately below)	St Guthlac's in the Castle
Hereford Priory		secular collegiate: St Peter's Collegiate Church founded before 1084; Benedictine monks transferred from earlier site (see immediately above); dependent on Gloucester; granted to Gloucester Abbey by Hugh de Lacy 1100; dissolved 1538; granted to John ap Rice 1542/43	St Guthlac St Peter, St Paul and St Guthlac
Hereford Blackfriars — earlier site		Dominican Friars (under the Visitation of Oxford) founded 1246 by Sir John Daniel; transferred to new site 1322 (see immediately below)	
Hereford Blackfriars		Dominican Friars (under the Visitation of Oxford) founded 1246 at earlier site (see immediately above); transferred to new site 1322; dissolved; granted to Elizabeth Wynne 1562/63	
Hereford Greyfriars		Franciscan Friars Minor (under the Custody of Bristol) founded before 1228; dissolved 1538	
Hereford Preceptory		Knights Hospitaller	
Holme Lacy	projected house of Premonstratensian Canons c.1235; daughter house of Lavendon; establishment never implemented		St Mary and St Thomas Martyr
Kilpeck Priory^{#}		Benedictine monks founded c.1134 by Hugh, son of William the Norman who granted the church to Gloucester; dissolved 1428 when the cell was united to Gloucester; granted to the Bishop of Gloucester	Kilpecke Priory
Kinsham Grange		Benedictine monks alien house;	
Leominster nunnery			
Leominster Priory ^{+}		Saxon nuns (possibly also monks) purportedly built c.660 by Merwald, King of West Mercia; destroyed in raids by the Danes 9th century; secular canons collegiate refounded 9th century; nuns 9th century; destroyed 1046; Benedictine monks founded after 1123: ruined monastery granted to Reading by Henry I, confirmed by Richard, Bishop of Hereford; rebuilt 12th century, fully conventual by 1139; dissolved 1539and granted to the bailiffs and burgesses of Leominster	St Peter (660); The Priory Church of Saint Peter and Saint Paul, Leominster (12th century)
Leominster Priory		Cluniac monks	
Limebrook Priory		Augustinian Canonesses (or Benedictine nuns?) founded c.1189 (during or before the reign of Richard I) by Robert de Lingen or a member of the Mortimer family; Augustinian Canonesses 1516 (in the time of Bishop Booth); dissolved 28 December 1539; granted to John West and Robert Gratwick 1553	St Mary ____________________; Lymbroke Priory
Moccas Clas		Celtic monks reputedly founded 6th century by St Dubricius from Hennland on Wye; dissolved before 1066?	Mochros
Monkland Priory		Benedictine monks alien house: cell dependent on Conches founded before 1100; dissolved c.1414	
Much Dewchurch Clas		monks of St David founded 6th century; parochial? before 1066	
Ocle Priory		Benedictine monks alien house: cell dependent on Lyre; founded c.1100 by the ancestors of Robert Chandos; granted to the Carthusians at Sheen, Surrey c.1414; granted to Sir Philip Hobby 1541/42; site now occupied by Livers Ocle farmhouse	Acley Priory; Livers Ocle Priory
Shobdon Priory		Augustinian Canons Regular — Victorine dependent on Bristol; founded between 1131 and 1135 (during the reign of Henry I and tenure of Robert de Bethune, Bishop of Hereford) by Oliver de Merlimound, steward for (and on behalf of) Hugh Mortimer; transferred to [Eye, nr.] Aymestrey c.1150; transferred from Beodune (?Byton) after 1155; transferred to north of Wigmore	
Sutton Camera		Knights Hospitaller under Dinmore	
Titley Priory ^{#}		Tironensian monks apparent alien house: cell dependent on Tiron; founded 1120–21; dissolved 1391; granted to Winchester College c.1535; church rebuilt 1865; house named "Priory Cottage" built on site 16th century	St Peter
Welsh Bicknor Clas		dissolved before 1100	
Wigmore Priory		Augustinian Canons Regular — Victorine (community founded at Shobdon 1131-35); transferred from [Eye, nr.] Aymestry; transferred to Beodune (? Byton)	
Wigmore Abbey ^		Augustinian Canons Regular — Victorine — from Shobdon; (community founded at Shobdon between 1131 and 1135); transferred here 1172-79 by Hugh Mortimer, Baron Wigmore; dissolved 1538; granted to Sir Thomas Palmer 1548/49; remains now incorporated into farm and buildings	St James
Wormsley Priory		possibly originally a hermitage; Augustinian Canons Regular — Victorine founded after 1200 (13th century) (late in the reign of John or early in the reign of Henry III) by Gilbert Talbot; dissolved 1539; granted to Edward Lord Clinton 1545/46	The Priory Church of Saint Mary and Saint Leonard, Wormsley ____________________; Priory of St Leonard de Pyon; Wormeley Abbey

Return to top of page

=== Hertfordshire ===
(For references and location detail see List of monastic houses in Hertfordshire)

Foundation	Image	Communities & provenance	Formal name or dedication & alternative names
Ashridge Priory		monastery or college of the Precious Blood; Bonshommes monks founded 1283 by Edmund, Earl of Cornwall; dissolved 16 November 1539	the Precious Blood
Barden Priory?		Augustinian Canons Regular possibly Berden, Essex or the hospital at Bigging (Berdene in Anstey)	St Mary
Cathale Priory		Benedictine nuns founded before 1189(?) (c.1200) probably by William de Mandeville; dissolved before 1240; granted to the nuns of Cheshunt by Henry de Bohun; canons removed; chapel survived to 1613 when land acquired by James I; chapel remains extant 1830s	
Cheshunt Priory		Benedictine nuns founded before 1183; dissolved 1536; granted to Sir Anthony Deny 1536/7	Cestrehunt Priory; Chesthunt Priory
Flamstead Priory		Benedictine nuns founded c.1150 (during the reign of Stephen) by Roger de Toney; dissolved 1537; granted to Sir Richard Page 1539/40; site now occupied by Beechwood Park School	Flamsted Priory
Hertford Priory ^{#}		Benedictine monks founded before 1093 (during the incumbency of Abbot Paul and during the reign of William the Conqueror (Note: Hertford Priory: Cobbett)) by Ralph de Limesy and granted to St Albans, Hertfordshire after 1077; dissolved 1538; granted to Sir Antony Denny and his wife 1537/8; conventual church demolished after 1540; passed to Sir Thomas Wiley who built the private chapel of St John, demolished 1680 on the orders of the Bishop of Lincoln; site now occupied by parish church	St Mary
Hertford Trinitarian Priory		lepers' hospital of St Mary Magdelene (founded before 1199) taken over by Trinitarians; Trinitarian monks founded c.1261; apparently under Easton, Wiltshire until 1448 as a hospital; later under Moatenden; apparently abandoned before 1535(?)	St Mary Magdalene (before 1199) Holy Trinity and St Thomas Martyr c.1261
Hitchin Whitefriars		Carmelite Friars founded c.1317; dissolved 17 October 1538; granted to Edward Watson and H. Henderson 1546/7; site now occupied by Hitchin Priory Hotel, part of cloister arches still visible; 17th/18th century country house built on site	St Mary ____________________; Hitchin 'Priory'
Hitchin Priory		Gilbertine Canons (Note: Hitchin Priory: mistakenly recorded as a nunnery by T. Tanner, Notitia Monastica) founded 1361-2 by Edward de Kendale; dissolved 1538	St Saviour
Hitchin Minster		Saxon minster founded before 11th century (references 10th & 11th century); parochial church before 1086	
Muresley Priory, nr Ivinghoe		Benedictine nuns founded between 1107 and 1129, reputedly by Walter Giffard, bishop of Winchester (who died 1129), (or c.1160 or 1133); community evicted; granted to Sir John Dance c.1537	St Margaret ____________________; Meursley Priory; Mursley Nunnery; St Margaret's Priory; St Margaret's in the Wood, Meuresley; St Margaret's de Bosco; Ivinghoe Nunnery; Ivinghoe Priory; Ivanhoe Monastery
King's Langley Priory		Dominican Friars (under the Visitation of Cambridge) founded before 1308; dissolved 1538; Dominican nuns — from Dartford refounded 1557; dissolved 1558: nuns transferred to Dartford	King's Langley Blackfriars
Lannock		Knights Templar founded before 1148 (manor granted to Templars but no preceptory founded); Knights Hospitaller let privately 1338	
Markyate Priory ^{#}		hermitage before 1145; Benedictine nuns founded 1145 by Ralph de Langford, Dean and Chapter of St Paul's, through the influence of Geoffrey, Abbot of St Albans; apparently soon destroyed by fire; dissolved 1537; granted to George Ferrers; site now occupied by a manor house named 'Markyate Cell' built on priory remains; parochial church of St John the Baptist built at the south corner of the site	Holy Trinity ____________________; Mergate Priory; Market-Street Priory
Mirdial Priory?		purported Augustinian Canons Regular (evidence lacking)	St Mary
New Biggin Priory ^{#}		Gilbertine Priory priory cell founded 1361-2 by Sir Edward de Kendale; dissolved 1538; granted to John Cokke 1544/5; residence built on site 1585; converted to almshouses c.1812	St Saviour ____________________; Hitchin Nunnery
Redbourn Priory		Benedictine monks cell dependent on St Albans; founded 1178 by Abbot Simon or Abbot Warin built by John, Bishop of Ardfert; plundered by the French 1217; apparently abandoned before 1535; granted to John Cock 1539/40	St Amphibalus ____________________; St Amphibalus Priory; Redburn Priory
Rowney Priory ^(?)		Benedictine nuns founded c.1164 by Conan, Duke of Brittany and Earl of Richmond; plundered early 15th century; dissolved 11 September 1457; granted to the patron, John Fray, chief baron of the Exchequer, who established a chantry; confiscated by the Crown 1548; 19th century house built on site, said to incorporate fabric from the priory	St John the Baptist ____________________; Rowheing Priory; Rownay Priory
Royston Priory		Augustinian Canons Regular founded 1173-9 by Ralph de Rochester (on the site of a chapel built by his uncle Eustace de Merk) built in the time of Walter Walensis, Abbot of Colchester; dissolved 9 April 1537; granted to Robert Slete, Esq. 1540/1 priory church converted for parochial use as the Parish Church of St John the Baptist; a Georgian House also built on the site	The Priory Church of St John the Baptist and St Thomas the Martyr
St Albans Abbey ^{+}		Benedictine? monks founded c.793; lax? c.820; secular collegiate and nuns from before 940; Benedictine monks and nuns c.970 (976) to 1140; Benedictine monks from 1140; dissolved 5 December 1539; parochial thereafter; episcopal diocesan cathedral founded 1877; extant	The Cathedral and Abbey Church of Saint Alban, St Albans
St Albans Nunnery		Benedictine nuns — with regular priests or brethren; attached to the abbey, living near the almonry; founded before 940; transferred to Sopwell 1140	
St Mary de Pre Priory		leper hospital founded 1194 by Warin (Garinus), Abbot of St Albans; Benedictine nuns with regular priests or brethren c.1328; Benedictine nuns founded after 1352; abandoned 1528; annexed to St Albans; granted to Ralph Rawlet, Esq. 1540/1	St Mary de Pré Priory; St Mary de Pre Nunnery; De La Praye Nunnery
St Margaret's Priory		Benedictine nuns founded before 1129, possibly by William Giffard, Bishop of Winchester, grants confirmed after his death 1129; dissolved 1536	Ivinghoe Priory
Sawbridgeworth Priory		Benedictine monks probable cell dependent on Westminster Abbey founded c.1135 (late in the reign of Henry I or during that of Stephen); conventual church now in parochial use as the Parish Church of St Mary the Great	
Sopwell Priory		purportedly a hermitage prior to Benedictine foundation; Benedictine nuns founded 1140 by Geoffrey, Abbott of St Albans; subject to the abbess of St Albans c.1330; dissolved 1537	St Mary ____________________; Sopewell Priory
Standon Cell		Sisters of the Order of St John of Jerusalem dissolved c.1180: transferred to Sisters of St John Priory, Buckland, Somerset	
Standon Preceptory		Knights Hospitaller founded 1147 (before 1154) (during the reign of Stephen) by Gilbert de Clare, Earl of Hereford; dissolved before 1443–4; leased out 1330; revived; under a preceptor 1360; leased out before 1443–4	
Standon Priory		hermitage built by William the Anchorite; Benedictine monks alien house: cell dependent on Stoke by Clare, Suffolk founded 1173 and 1178 when Richard de Clare Earl of Hertford granted to his monks of Stoke the hermitage; dissolved c.1306; apparently reverted to a hermitage or chapel 1306; granted to Stoke College 1415	The Priory Church of St Michael of Salburn in Standon ____________________; Salburn Priory in Standon; Salburn Priory
Temple Dinsley Preceptory ^{#}		Knights Templar founded 1147 (during the reign of Stephen): granted by Bernard de Balliol, preceptory established later; dissolved 1308–12; Knights Hospitaller refounded 1324; let privately 1338; preceptory founded after 1338; leased to the preceptor of Ribstone and Mount St John 1498; let out privately 1507; granted by Henry VIII to Sir Ralph Sadler demolished 1712; site now occupied by The Princess Helena College built 1714	Temple Dynnesley Preceptory
Ware Priory ^{#+}		Benedictine monks alien house: dependent on St-Evroul; founded before 1081, with endowment by Hugo de Grentemaisnil; dissolved 1414; granted to the Carthusians at Sheen, Surrey (Greater London); granted by Henry VIII; The old rectory or manor house built on the site early-17th century, altered 18th and 19th century; conventual church much altered, now in parochial use as parish church of St Mary the Virgin;— little, if any, remaining monastic fabric	
Ware Greyfriars		Franciscan Friars Minor (under the Custody of Cambridge) founded 1338 by Thomas second Lord Wake of Liddell, who received the king's permission in February 1338 to give to the Friars Minors property and land; dissolved 1538;; private residence 1544; incorporated into a house named 'The Priory'	
Wormley Priory ^{+}		Augustinian Canons Regular cell, dependent on Waltham, Essex; founded after 1177 (when church and manor granted to Waltham) and before c.1260; dissolved c.1510(?): alienated from Waltham; church restored 19th century; now in use of parish church of St Laurence	St Lawrence ____________________; Prior Sancti Laurentii de Worem
Wymondley Priory, Little Wymondley		hospital founded before 1218 by Richard [de] Argentein; Augustinian Canons Regular founded soon after; hospital continued until 1290; dissolved 6 April 1537; granted to James Nedeham, surveyor of the king's works, 1541/2; site now occupied by a Tudor Tithe barn	St Mary ____________________; Little Wymondley Priory; Wymondesley Parva Priory

Return to top of page

=== Isle of Wight ===
Foundation	Image	Communities and provenance	Formal name or dedication and alternative names
Appuldurcombe House, Wroxall		Benedictine monks alien house dependent on Montebourg; founded c.1100: manor granted by Richard de Redvers to Montebourg Abbey before 1090; dissolved 1414; 16th century Elizabethan house built on site; hotel 1859; leased for use as a college for young gentlemen 1867-1890s; Benedictine monks founded 1901–1908; virtually abandoned 1909; used to accommodate troops in the two World Wars; damaged by a mine 1943; currently a shell internally in ruins; (EH)	St Mary
Barton Priory		Augustinian Canons Regular — from Cambridge priory(?) founded 1275 by John Insula, Rector of Shalfleet and Thomas de Winton, Rector of Godshill; dissolved 1439; granted to Winchester College	The Holy Trinity; Barton Oratory; Burton College
St Mary's Priory, Carisbrooke^{#}		Cistercian monks alien house: priory cell dependent on Lire Abbey; founded c.1156 by Baldwin de Redvers: granted to Lire by William fitz Osbern, Marshall of William the Conqueror; granted to Mount Grace, Yorkshire, by Richard II; Benedictine monks restored by Henry IV; dissolved 1414; granted to the Carthusians at Sheen, Surrey by Henry V	The Priory Church of Saint Mary the Virgin, Carisbrooke
Carisbrooke Priory *		Dominican nuns currently owned by the Carisbrooke Priory Trust, a registered charity; extant	The Open Door
Newport Whitefriars?		Carmelite Friars	
Quarr Abbey		Savignac monks founded 27 April 1132 by Baldwin de Redvers (Redveriis); Cistercian monks orders merged 17 September 1147; dissolved 1536; granted to John and George Mills 1544/5	The Abbey Church of Our Lady of the Quarry; Quarrer Abbey
Quarr Abbey *, Binsted		Benedictine monks founded 24 May 1907 from Appuldurcombe House current house constructed from the ruined masonry of the former abbey; extant	
St Cecilia's Abbey, Ryde * Appley House, Ryde		Solesmes nuns returned to France from exile Benedictine nuns daughter of Liege Abbey; founded at Ventnor 1882; transferred to Appley House 1922; priory attained abbey status 1926; aggregated into the Solesmes Community 1950; extant	Priory of the Peace of the Heart of Jesus; Abbey of the Peace of the Heart of Jesus (1926)
St Cross Priory		Tironensian monks alien house: cell dependent Tiron; founded before 1132 (c.1120): church founded (in the tenure of Gervase, Abbot de Insula (Quarr)) by Robert Colaws; dissolved 1391; granted to Winchester College; site apparently occupied by a viaduct and railway	
St Helen's Priory		Cluniac monks alien house: dependent on Wenlock, Shropshire; founded c.1090 (before 1155); dissolved 1414	
Ventnor Priory, Steephill View		Benedictine nuns daughter of Liege Abbey, Belgium, founded 1882; transferred to Appley House, Ryde 1922; Steephill View house now demolished; Priory Lodge, built 1970, now occupies the site	Pax Cordis Jesu

Return to top of page

=== Kent ===
Foundation	Image	Communities & provenance	Formal name or dedication & alternative names
Aylesford Priory *		Carmelite Friars founded 1242 by Richard de Grey, Lord of Cudnor (Richard, Lord Grey); conventual church built 1242–1248; rebuilt 1348–1417; dissolved 1538; granted to Sir Thomas Wyat 1541/2; church demolished, conventual buildings converted for private residence; rebuilt after fire 1930; Carmelite Friars from 1949	'The Friars'
Badlesmere Priory		Augustinian Canons Regular founded 8th century	
Badmonden Priory		Augustinian Canons Regular (?)alien house: cell dependent on Beaulieu, Normandy dissolved 1414; granted to St Andrew's Priory, Rochester; dissolved 1540; granted to the dean and chapter of Rochester	
Bilsington Priory ^		Augustinian Canons Regular founded 1253 by John Mansell (Maunsel), Lord Chief Justice of England; dissolved 28 February 1536; granted to the Archbishop of Canterbury 1538/9; used as a farmhouse through post-medieval period; remains now incorporated into a house	
Blakwose Priory		Premonstratensian Canons cell of Lavendon, Buckinghamshire founded before 1158; transferred to St Radegund's after 1203–4; retained as a grange of the abbey; dissolved c.1377	Blackwose Priory
Boxley Abbey ^		Cistercian monks daughter house of Clairvaux; founded 23 October 1143 (1143/46) by William de Ipre, Earl of Kent; dissolved 21 January 1538; granted to Sir Thomas Wyat 1540/1; part of remains now incorporated into a private house	The Priory Church of the Blessed Virgin Mary, Bilsington
Brockley Abbey	Historical county location. See entry under London		
Canterbury Austin Friars, earlier site		Augustinian Friars founded 1318 by Richard French, baker (licence granted to Walter Reynolds, Archbishop of Canterbury by Edward II to alienate part of the former Friars of the Sack site to the Austin Friars); transferred to new site (see immediately below) 1324	
Canterbury Austin Friars		Augustinian Friars (community founded at earlier site (see immediately above) 1318); transferred here 1324; rebuilt 1408; dissolved December 1538; granted to G. Harper 1541/2	
Canterbury Blackfriars ^		Dominican Friars (under the Visitation of London) founded c.1236 (c.1221) by Henry III; church built 1237 to after 1244; dissolved 1538; granted to Thomas Wiseman 1559/60; frater currently in use as a church of the Church of the First Church of Christ Scientist	
Canterbury Cathedral Priory^{+}		secular canons possibly collegiate founded c.600 (598): Roman church restored by St Augustine with the aid of Æthelberht, King of Kent; episcopal diocesan cathedral founded c.600; extant; Benedictine monks founded 997; rebuilt 1070 under Archbishop Lanfranc; dissolved 1539;	The Cathedral and Abbey Church of Christ, Canterbury, The Cathedral Church of Christ, Canterbury
Canterbury Friars of the Sack		Friars of the Sack founded before 1274; some friars apparently transferred to new site at Cambridge before 1289; dissolved after 1314	
Canterbury Greyfriars, earlier site		Franciscan Friars Minor, Conventual (under the Custody of London) founded 1224; transferred to new site (see immediately below) c.1268	
Canterbury Greyfriars		Franciscan Friars Minor, Conventual (under the Custody of London) (community founded apparently on a site north of the hospital (see immediately above) 1224); transferred here c.1268: founded 1270 by John Diggs, an Alderman of the city; Observant Franciscan Friars transferred 1489; dissolved 1534; Franciscan Friars Minor, Conventual transferred from Observants 1534; dissolved 1538; granted to Thomas Spilman 1539/40	
Canterbury — St Augustine's Abbey		Benedictine monks (assumed) founded (598-605) 598 by Æthelberht, King of Kent on the advice of St Augustine; Benedictine monks (re)founded c.960; dissolved 30 July 1538; (EH)	St Peter and St Paul St Peter, St Paul and St Augustine (978) The Abbey Church of Saint Augustine, Canterbury
Canterbury — St Gregory's Priory		secular monastery founded by 1087 (before 1086) by Lanfranc, Archbishop of Canterbury; Augustinian Canons Regular refounded c.1123; church destroyed by fire 1145, rebuilt; dissolved 1536 (1537); granted to the Archbishop of Canterbury 1536/7	St Gregory's Hospital
Canterbury — St Mildred's Monastery		purported early Saxon monastery; probable minster 8th century	
Canterbury — Priory of St Sepulchre		Benedictine nuns founded c.1100 by Anselm, Archbishop of Canterbury; dissolved 1536; granted to James Hale 1546/7	St Sepulchre's Nunnery
Canterbury — St Mary of the Angels Friary *		Franciscan Friars Minor involved in running the Franciscan International Study Centre; extant	Friary of St Mary of the Angels
Cliffe Cell		Cluniac monks	
Combwell Priory^{#}		Augustinian Canons Regular abbey founded c.1220 by Robert de Turneham; reduced to priory status c.1220 due to endowment shortfall; disputed between Augustinian and Premonstratensian — found in favour of Augustinians c.1230; dissolved 1536; granted to Thomas Culpepper 1537/8; granted to Sir John Gage 1542/3	Cumbwell Priory; Combwell Abbey
Darenth Priory		Benedictine monks cell, apparently dependent on Rochester founded after 971: Archbishop Hubert granted the manor of Darent; dissolution unknown	
Dartford Blackfriars		Dominican Friars (under the visitation of London) founded 1356; attached to the nunnery (see immediately below); prior and friars recorded 1373; dissolved 1539	
Dartford Priory		Dominican nuns (or Augustinian Canonesses) subject to King's Langley, Hertfordshire founded 1346 by Edward III in the buildings of a former royal palace; dissolved after Elizabeth Cressener died and after 1 April 1539; Henry VIII built a manor house on the site; granted to Edmund Mervyn 1540/1, afterwards becoming the property of the Earl of Salisbury; Dominican nuns — from King's Langley refounded 1558; dissolved after 1559; granted to Anne of Cleves by Edward VI; later used by Queen Elizabeth; alienated by James I; J & E Hall's engineering works built on part of site	St Mary and St Margaret ____________________; Dertford Priory; Dartford Nunnery
Davington Priory^{+}^		Benedictine nuns founded 1153 by Fulk de Newenham; dissolved 1535; granted to Sir Thomas Cheney 1546/7; church now in parochial use — priory buildings in private ownership; restored as a private residence 19th century; since 1982 owned by Bob Geldof	The Priory Church of Saint Mary Magdalen, Davington; (parochially also dedicated to St Lawrence)
Dover Priory, earlier site		Saxon minster, secular canons founded 640 by Eadbald, King of Kent; transferred to St Martin's c.696 (see immediately below) by King Wihtred; church apparently rebuilt 10th century; repaired 1582, but practically unused thereafter and in ruins by 1724; in use as a Fives' Court early-1790s; in use as a garrison coal store during Napoleonic Wars (1793–1815); restored 1862 by Sir George Gilbert Scott and 1888 by William Butterfield	St Mary in Castro (St Mary in the Castle)
Dover Priory ^		secular canons transferred to from site within the castle (see immediately above) c.696 by King Wihtred; (?abbey 697); Augustinian Canons Regular refounded 1131 by Henry I and William de Corbeil, Archbishop of Canterbury; Benedictine monks — from Canterbury (who forced withdrawal of Augustinians) 1136; monks apparently withdrawn; Benedictine monks — sent from Canterbury by Theobald of Bec, Archbishop of Canterbury 1139; cell dependent on Canterbury; dissolved 1535; remains now incorporated into a private school: Dover College	The Priory Church of Saint Mary the Virgin and Saint Martin of the New Work, Dover
Dover Minster		Saxon minster founded 691; rebuilt 1070s; in parochial use as the Church of St Martin-le-Grand, from 16th century; demolished 18th-19th century; remains destroyed during World War II	
Dover Preceptory (?)		Knights Templar founded c.1128(?) apparently transferred to Temple Ewell before c.1185; (EH)	
Eastry Monastery (?)		a monastery purportedly founded before 673 by King Egbert — existence doubtful	
Elfleet Monastery (?)		founded by Domneva — probably Ebbsfleet possible duplication of Minster in Thanet Nunnery	
Erith Franciscan Friary *		Capuchin Franciscan Friars founded 1902; present church opened 1963; extant	
Faversham Abbey		Cluniac monks — from Bermondsey, Surrey founded 1148 (1147) by King Stephen and his queen Maud (Matilda) (apparently only nominally Cluniac from the outset); Benedictine monks 13th century (before 1207: by the reign of Henry III); dissolved 8 July 1538	St Saviour
Folkestone Priory, earlier site		Saxon minster and Benedictine? nuns founded before 640 by Eadbald, King of Kent — built in the castle precinct; destroyed in raids by the Danes before 927 (before 924); Benedictine monks alien house: dependent on Lonlay founded 1095: church granted to Lonlay by Nigel de Munevilla and his wife; abandoned 1137: transferred to new site (see immediately below)	St Mary and St Eanswith
Folkestone Priory		Benedictine monks alien house: dependent on Lonlay; (community founded at earlier site (see immediately above) before 640); transferred here 1137, permission granted to William de Albrinsis; became denizen:independent from 1399; dissolved November 1539, when priory was ruinous; leased to Edward, Lord Clinton; granted to him 9 January 1539	Falkstone Priory
Greenwich Friary	Historical county location. See entry under London		
Higham Priory		Benedictine nuns alien house: dependent on St-Sulpice-la-Forêt; founded c.1148(?) (1551) by King Stephen; became denizen: independent from after 1227; dissolved 1521–2; granted to St John's College, Cambridge by Henry VIII 1522	Lillechurch Priory; Littlechurch Priory; Heyham Priory
Hoo Monastery		Benedictine? monks founded c.(686-)687: land on the island (later Hoo St Werburgh) and adjoining granted tn Ecgbald and his familia monastery under an abbot 716; destroyed in raids by the Danes 9th century?	
Horton Priory ^		Cluniac monks alien house: cell dependent on Lewes, Sussex; founded c.1142 by Robert de Vere; became denizen: independent from 1351–74; dissolved 1536; granted to Richard Tate 1338–9; thereafter granted to --- Mantell; remains now incorporated into a private house	The Priory Church of St John the Evangelist, Horton ____________________; Monk's Horton Priory; Monkshorton Priory
Hythe Monastery		uncertain order and foundation	
Leeds Priory		Augustinian Canons Regular founded 1119 by Robert de Crevecoeur (Croucheart/Crepido Corde), Kt.; dissolved c.1540 (1539); granted to Sir Antony St Leger 1550–1	St Mary and St Nicholas ____________________; Leedes Priory
Lesnes Abbey (Westwood Abbey)	Historical county location. See entry under London		
Lewisham Priory	Historical county location. See entry under London		
Lossenham Friary		Carmelite Friars founded c.1242-7; destroyed by fire 1275; rebuilt; dissolved 1538	Lossenham Whitefriars
Lydd Monastery^{+}		Saxon minster possible monastic house founded after 774: land granted to the Archbishop of Canterbury; destroyed in raids by the Danes 893; Anglo-Saxon remains incorporated into All Saints' parish church	
Lyminge Abbey^{+}		Benedictine? nuns founded c.633 by Ethelburga, daughter of Æthelberht, King of Kent, on the site of a possibly Roman villa; monks and nuns refounded before 736 under Abbot Cuthbert; ravaged in raids by the Danes, but continued to after 964 (the time of Archbishop Dunstan); Saxon church, rebuilt c.965, incorporating remains of abbey church	Liming Abbey
Maidstone Friary		Carmelite Friars; 13th century Allington Castle site sold to Carmelites 1951; in private ownership early-21stC	
Maidstone Franciscan Friary		Franciscan Friars licence obtained 13 May 1331 by John atte Water to alienate in mortmain to the minister and Friars Minors of England property and land in Maidstone to build an oratory and dwelling-place; establishment never implemented	
Minster in Sheppey Priory^{+}		Benedictine? nuns founded c.670; destroyed in raids by the Danes before 900 (855); Benedictine nuns founded before 1087; Augustinian Canonesses? refounded 1123 (1130?, 1150) by William de Corbeil, Archbishop of Canterbury; Benedictine nuns refounded 1186?; Augustinian Canonesses refounded 1396; dissolved 1536; granted to Sir Thomas Cheiney (Cheney) 1537/8; remains of conventual church incorporated into parochial church	St Sexburga St Mary and St Sexburgha ____________________; Shepey Priory
Minster in Thanet Priory, earlier site		Saxon minster and Benedictine? nuns founded 669, granted by King Egbert to his niece Domneva to found a monastery; destroyed in raids by the Danes 1011; transferred to new site (see immediately below) secular collegiate Benedictine monks granted to St Augustine's Abbey 1027 by King Cnut; refounded as a grange of St Augustine's; 11th-13th century parochial church of St Mary reputedly built on site	St Domneva
Minster in Thanet Priory		Benedictine nuns transferred from earlier site (see immediately above)	St Mary Virgin St Mildred
Minster Abbey *		Benedictine nuns founded 1937; built on site of the earlier abbey (see immediately above); extant	
Minster in Thanet Nunnery		Benedictine nuns founded c.750, built by Ermengitha, sister of Domneva destroyed? in raids by the Danes 980	
Minster in Thanet Priory		Benedictine monks founded c.670, granted to Domneva by King Egbert, her uncle; destroyed in raids by the Danes 980; dependent on St Augustine's, Canterbury; granted to St Augustine's by Cnut 1027;	St Mary Virgin
Moatenden Priory		Trinitarian monks founded 1224 by Sir Michael de Ponynges; dissolved 1538; granted to Sir Antony Aucher 1538/9; site now occupied by a house named 'Moatenden Manor'	Mottenden Priory; Headcorn Priory; Muttiden Friary
New Romney Priory		Cistercian monks and nuns — double house alien house: grange dependent on Pontigny; founded 1264; dissolved c.1414	St John
New Romney Greyfriars		Franciscan Friars Minor, Conventual (under the Custody of London) founded before 1241; dissolved c.1287	Romney Greyfriars
Newington Priory		Benedictine nuns foundation unknown; transferred to Minster before 1087(?) secular canons from between 1154 and 1170; possible secular college, probably dissolved before 1179	
Ospringe Crutched Friars		Crutched Friars founded before 1234; dissolved c.1470; became a secular hospital	
Patrixbourne Priory		Saxon minster Augustinian Canons Regular alien house: cell dependent on Beaulieu, Normandy; founded c.1200; dissolved 1409; restored 1849 by Mr Marshall of Canterbury and 1857 by Sir George Gilbert Scott; church in parochial use as the Parish Church of St Mary	St Mary
Reculver Abbey		Benedictine? monks founded 669, granted to Bass (Bassa), priest, by Egbert, King of Kent; destroyed in raids by the Danes; annexed to Canterbury 949 by King Eadred: abbot and Benedictines probably removed; under a dean until c.1030	Raculfe Abbey
Rochester Cathedral Priory^{+}		secular canons founded 604; dissolved 1080; episcopal diocesan cathedral founded 604; extant; Benedictine monks refounded 1080 by Æthelberht, King of Kent; dissolved 1540	The Cathedral and Priory Church of Saint Andrew, Rochester
St Mildred's Monastery		purported early Saxon monastery; probably a minster 8th century	
St Radegund's Abbey		Premonstratensian Canons daughter house of Prémontré; founded 1193; dissolved 1536; now in private ownership	Bradsole Abbey
Salmstone Priory		Benedictine monks residential grange and manor with chapel dependent on St Augustine's, Canterbury	
Sandwich Whitefriars		Carmellite Friars founded before 1268 (before c.1272) dissolved 1538	
Sittingbourne Austin Friars		hospital, hermitage and chapel Silvester, the superior, apparently became a member of Austin Friars and received a grant to alienate the foundation; Austin Friars founded 1255; dissolved 1256?, Silvester apparently lapsed and the foundation ceased to be an Austin establishment	Shamele Austin Friars
Shoreham Minster		Saxon minster founded before 700; present church on site, the Parish Church of SS Peter and Paul, built between 1230 and 1270 (during the reign of Edward III) on the site of an earlier church	
Strood Hospital		hospital founded 1192-3; Benedictine monks founded 1330: required master to be a Benedictine monk; dissolved c.1402; continued as hospital to 1539	St Mary
Strood Preceptory		Knights Templar	
Sutton-at-Hone Preceptory^{+}		hospital founded before 1199; Knights Hospitaller granted 1214; preceptory established; lapsed before 1338 and farmed out; evidently revived shortly afterwards; dissolved 1358; remains in use as chapel and private residence; (NT)	St John's Jerusalem
Swingfield Preceptory		Sisters of the Order of St John of Jerusalem cell foundation unknown; transferred to Sisters of St John Priory, Buckland, Somerset c.1180; Knights Hospitaller founded before 1180; dissolved 1540	St John's Commandery; St John's Chapel
Temple Ewell Preceptory^{+}, Ewell		Knights Templar founded c.1185, benefactors William, brother of the King, and William Peverelle; dissolved 1308–1312; Knights Hospitaller refounded 1312; dissolved 1540; remains incorporated into parochial church	
Thanington Nunnery		St James's hospital founded before 1164; apparently became nunnery or sisterhood before 1343, with regular priests or brethren to after 1415; possibly ceased to be a hospital, at least for a time; dissolved 1551; granted to Robert Dartnall 1551/2	Tanington Hospital
Throwley Priory^{#}		Benedictine monks alien house: cell dependent on St Bertin, St Omer; founded c.1150 by Hugh de Chilham and William de Ipra; dissolved 1414; granted to Syon Abbey; house named 'Glebe Cottage' built on site	Thurleigh Priory
Tonbridge Priory^{#}		Augustinian Canons Regular founded before 1192 (late in the reign of Henry II) by Richard de Clare, Earl of Hartford (confirmed by the Pope 1192); dissolved 8 February 1525; became ruinous between 1753 and 1780; site later occupied by a railway goods station	St Mary Magdalen
West Langdon Abbey^{#}		Premonstratensian Canons daughter house of Leiston; founded 1189 (1192) by William de Auberville; dissolved 1535; granted to the Archbishop of Canterbury 1538/9; site now occupied by 16th-century farmhouse currently in use as a holiday cottage	St Mary and St Thomas Martyr of Canterbury ____________________; Langdon Abbey
West Malling Abbey		nuns founded 688(?); no further reference until: Benedictine nuns transferred from Twickenham founded c.1090 (during the reign of William II) by Gundulf, Bishop of Rochester; transferred to Milford Haven; dissolved 1538; granted to Henry Cobham, alias Brook 1569/70	The Abbey Church of Saint Mary, West Malling
West Peckham Preceptory		Knights Hospitaller founded 1337 by Sir John Culpepper; dissolved 1540; granted to Sir Robert Southwell 1543/4;	West Peccham Hospital; West Peckham Camera

Return to top of page

=== Lancashire ===
(For references and location detail see List of monastic houses in Lancashire)

Foundation	Image	Communities & provenance	Formal name or dedication & alternative names
Barnoldswick Abbey		Cistercian monks daughter house of Fountains, Yorkshire; founded 19 May 1147; transferred to Kirkstall, Yorkshire 1152, thereafter retained as a grange; currently located in a field called 'Monk's Royd'	Mount St Mary's Abbey
Beaumont Grange		Savignac monks dependent on Furness (Cumbria) founded c.1130: granted by Warine; a 'large and important colony'; Cistercian monks orders merged 17 September 1147	
Burscough Priory		Augustinian Canons Regular founded 1186 (c.1190) by Robert Fitz Henry, Lord of Lathom and Knowsley probably for canons from Norton; dissolved 1536	St Nicholas ____________________ probably Blakesmere Priory
Cartmel Priory	Historical county location. See entry under Cumbria		
Chapel-le-Wood Cell	Historical county location. See entry under Cumbria		
Cockerham Priory ^{#}		Augustinian Canons Regular cell of St Mary in the Meadows (de Pratis) at Leicester; founded c.1207 or 1208: granted to Leicester 1153-4 by William de Lancaster; cell 1281–90, secular chaplain appointed — most of the canons withdrawn; dissolved 1477	
Cockersand Abbey		land granted to Leicester 1153-6 by William I of Lancaster; Hospital of St Mary founded before 1184 by Hugh Garth, hermit, with benefactions from William of Lancaster II; Premonstratensian Canons cell dependent on Croxton, Leicestershire; priory refounded after 1184 by William of Lancaster (Lancastre) raised to abbey status 1192, continuing as a hospital; dissolved 29 January 1539; granted to John Kechin (Kitchen) 1543/4; now in private ownership of the Dalton family	St Mary ____________________; Thurnham Abbey
Conishead Priory	Historical county location. See entry under Cumbria		
Furness Abbey	Historical county location. See entry under Cumbria		
Hawkshead Grange	Historical county location. See entry under Cumbria		
Heysham Monastery(?) ^{#}		suggested early monastic settlement; 14th-15th century church of St Peter built on site, incorporating pre-Conquest remains 800–950	
Hornby Priory ^{#}		possible hospital 1160–1172; Premonstratensian Canons cell daughter house of Croxton, Leicestershire; founded c.1172(?) by a member of the Montbegons of Hornby (the ancestors of Sir Thomas Stanley) probably by Roger de Motgebon III; dissolved September 1538; granted to Lord Montegle 1544/5	St Wilfrid ____________________; Horneby Priory
Kersal Priory	Historical county location. See entry under Greater Manchester		
Lancaster Blackfriars		Dominican Friars (under the Visitation of York) founded 1259/60 by Sir Hugh Harrington; dissolved 1539; granted to John Polcroft 1540/1	
Lancaster Greyfriars		Franciscan Friars some evidence of short-lived house, precise site and dates of foundation and dissolution unknown	
Lancaster Priory		Benedictine monks founded c.1094 by Earl Roger of Poictiers (Roger, Earl of Poitiers); alien house: dependent on Séez; dissolved 1428	St Mary
Lytham Priory		Benedictine monks cell dependent on Durham; founded 1189-94 (1191-4) by Richard Fitz Rogers; dissolved 1535 (1534); granted to Sir Thomas Holcroft; demolished; 17th century country house built on site	St Mary and St Cuthbert ____________________; Lythom Priory
Marland Grange	Historical county location. See entry under Greater Manchester		
Penwortham Priory		Benedictine monks founded c.1104 (between 1104 and 1122) by the bounty of Warine Bussel; dissolved c.1535; granted to John Fleetwood 1542/3	
Preston Greyfriars		Franciscan Friars Minor, Conventual (under the Custody of Worcester) founded 1256(?) c.1260 by Edmond, Earl of Lancaster; dissolved 1539; granted to Thomas Holcroft 1540/1	
Sawley Abbey		Cistercian monks — from Newminster, Northumberland daughter house of Newminster; founded probably 6 January 1147 by William de Percy, monks probably arrived 1 January 1148; dissolved 1536; EH	Salley Abbey; Sallay Abbey
Staining Grange		Cistercian monks grange of Stanlow, Cheshire, then of Whalley; founded before 1240	
Tulketh Priory		Sauvignac monks founded 4 July 1124 by Stephen, Count of Boulogne; transferred to Furness (Cumbria) 1127	
Upholland Priory^{+}		chantry and collegiate chapel founded 1307–10; Benedictine monks/friars? founded 1319 (1318) by Walter Langton, Bishop of Lichfield; dissolved 1536; granted to John Holcroft 1545/6; remains incorporated into the Parish Church of St Thomas the Martyr	Holand Friary
Warburton Priory	Historical county location. See entry under Greater Manchester		
Warrington Austin Friars	Historical county location. See entry under Merseyside		
Whalley Abbey		Cistercian monks — from Stanlow, Cheshire daughter house of Combermere, Cheshire; (community founded at Stanlow 11 November 1172); transferred here 1296, founded 4 April 1296; dissolved 10 March 1537; granted to Richard Assheton and John Braddyll 1553/4; now in ownership of the Anglican Diocese of Blackburn and the Catholic Church	The Blessed Virgin Mary ____________________; Locus Benedictus de Whalley Abbey
Wyresdale Abbey		Cistercian monks — from Furness (Cumbria) and Savigny founded 1193 (c.1196), site possibly granted by Theobald Walter who appropriated a church to the new foundation between 1193 and 1196; transferred to Arklow, Co. Wicklow, Ireland, then to Abingdon, Co. Limerick; traditionally the site is below the meeting of the Marshaw Wyre and the Tarnbrook Wyre, on the north bank of the Abbeystead reservoir	

Return to top of page

=== Leicestershire ===
(For references and location detail see List of monastic houses in Leicestershire)

Foundation	Image	Communities & provenance	Formal name or dedication & alternative names
Aldermanshaw Priory ^		Cluniac monks founded before/c.1220-35; alien house: cell dependent on Bermondsey, Surrey (London); dissolved/ruinous before 1450; 17th century cottage built on site	Aldermans Haw
Belvoir Priory		Benedictine monks priory cell, dependent on St Albans, Hertfordshire; founded 1076-88 begun by Robert de Todeni, lord of Belvoir 1076; completed by Abbot Paul of St Albans; dissolved 1539	
Bradley Priory		Augustinian Canons Regular founded after 1220 by Robert Bundy; dissolved 1536; granted to Thomas Newell, Esq. 1537/8	Braddley Priory
Holy Hill monastery, Breedon ^{#}		Saxon Benedictine? monks — from Medeshamstede (Peterborough), (Cambridgeshire) founded late-7th century; abandoned 874 during Danish raids; Augustinian Priory built on site (see immediately below)	
Breedon Priory ^{+}		Augustinian Canons Regular priory cell, dependent on Nostell, Yorkshire; refounded between 1109 and 1122, on site of earlier Saxon monastery (see immediately above): church of SS Mary and Hardulph granted to Nostel by Robert de Ferrers; dissolved November 1539; granted to John, Lord Grey 1553	Bredon Priory
Buckminster ^{~}		possible Saxon minster	
Charley Priory ^{$}		dependent on Luffield, Buckinghamshire; confirmed to Luffield by the Pope 1173–4; founded before 1190, granted to Evroul by Countess Parnel of Leicester (Blanchmain's, Earl of Leicester); confirmed to Ware, chief dependency of St Evroul in England 1203–6; described as hermitage c.1220; Augustinian Canons Regular alien house: grange dependent on St Evroul; founded after 1220; ruinous 1455; dissolved 1465; granted to Frideswide, widow; united with Ulverscroft c.1465	Chorley and Ulverscroft Priory; Locum de S. Mariae de Charleia
Croxton Abbey		Premonstratensian Canons — from Newhouse, Lincolnshire; founded before 1160 (1163, 1162) by William Porcarius; dissolved 1538 (1539); granted to Thomas, Earl of Rutland 1538/9	Croxton Kerrial Abbey
Dalby and Heather Preceptory ^{#}		Knights Hospitallers founded before 1206, granted purportedly by Robert Bossu, Earl of Leicester; dissolved 1538 (1540); granted to Sir Andrew Nowell	Old Dalby Preceptory; Dalby Preceptory
Garendon Abbey		Cistercian monks probable daughter house of Waverley, Surrey; founded 28 October 1133 by Roboert Bossu, Earl of Leicester; dissolved 1536; granted to Thomas, Earl of Rutland 1540/1; house named 'Garendon Hall' built on site, demolished 1964	Gerondon Abbey
Grace Dieu Priory ^		Augustinian Canonesses founded c.1239/40 by Rose (Rorsia) de Verdon; 'White Nuns of St Augustine' dissolved 1538; granted to Humphrey Foster 1538/9; remains incorporated into a cottage; largely demolished 1696; in care of Grace Dieu Priory Trust; open to public from late 2004	The Priory Church of Holy Trinity and St Mary, Belton ____________________; Gracedieu Priory; Belton Priory
Heather Preceptory		Knights Hospitallers founded before 1199 (during the reign of King John); reduced to camera before 1338; dissolution unknown — administered from Dalby (itself dissolved 1540)	Hether Hospital
Hinckley Priory		Benedictine monks alien house: priory cell dependent on Lyre; founded before 1173(?): church and land granted to Lyre by Robert [Blanchmaines], Earl of Leicester (confirmed by Henry II); dissolved 1409; granted to the Dean and Chapter of Westminster; site later occupied by a mansion then smaller private houses	Hinkley Priory
Hinckley Dominican Priory		Dominican monks	
Kirby Bellars Priory +		Secular college or chantry founded 1316 by Roger de Bellars; Augustinian Canons Regular took on St Augustine's Rule in 1359; domestic buildings rebuilt before the reformation after a fire c. 1511; dissolved 1536: granted to Charles Blount, Lord Mountjoy 1543/4; earthworks work mark the remains of the site in the field north of the current parish church	Kirkby Bellers Priory; Kirkby Bellairs Priory; Kerkbey on the Wrethek Priory
Langley Priory ^		Benedictine nuns — from Farewell, Staffordshire founded c.1150(?) by William Pantulf (Pontulf) and his wife burgia; Cistercian nuns? (claimed during time of Pope Alexander III, claim apparently abandoned 13th century); dissolved 1536 (before1537); granted to Thomas Grey 1543/4; incorporated into a 16th/17th century house; present house incorporates medieval fabric	The Priory Church of God and the Blessed Virgin
Launde Priory ^{#}	The Chapel at Launde Abbey, part of the original priory buildings	Augustinian Canons Regular founded 1119-25 by Richard Basset and his wife Maud; dissolved 1539; granted to Thomas, Lord Cromwell 1539/40; site occupied by manor house named 'Launde Abbey' now a retreat/conference centre	St John the Baptist ____________________; Landa Priory
Leicester Abbey		Augustinian Canons Regular founded 1143 (1139?) by Robert Bossu, Earl of Leicester; dissolved 1538; granted to William, Marquis of Northampton 1550/1	The Abbey Church of the Assumption of the Blessed Virgin Mary, Leicester ____________________; St Mary de Pre; St Mary de Pratis (St Mary of the Meadows)
Leicester Austin Friary		Augustinian hermits founded 1254; dissolved November 1538; granted to John Bellew and John Broxholm	St Catherine
Leicester Blackfriars ^{#}		Dominican Friars (under the Visitation of Oxford) founded before 1284; dissolved 1538; granted to Henry, Marquis of Dorset 1546/7	St Clement
Leicester Friars of the Sack ^{~}		Friars of the Sack founded before 1274; apparently abandoned by 1295	
Leicester Greyfriars		Franciscan Friars Minor, Conventual (under the Custody of Oxford) founded before 1230 (1265) by Simon de Montfort, Earl of Leicester; Burial place of King Richard III after his defeat at the Battle of Bosworth 1485 (confirmed by the recovery of his body 2013); dissolved 1538; granted to John Bellew and John Broxholm 1545/6	
Leicester — Holy Cross Priory *		Dominican Friars founded 1882; church consecrated 14 May 1958; extant	The Priory of the Holy Cross, Leicester
Minsterton Monastery		possible Saxon minster	
Mount St Bernard Abbey, earlier site ^{#}		Cistercian monks (Cistercian order of the Strict Observance/Trappists) founded 1835; became a guest house when new monastery (see immediately below) opened 1844; reformatory 1856; closed 1885, demolished	
Mount St Bernard Abbey *		Cistercian monks (Cistercian order of the Strict Observance / Trappists) founded 1844; replaced earlier monastery (see immediately above); extant	
Owston Abbey ^{+}		Augustinian Canons Regular — Arroaisan founded before 1161 by Sir Robert Grimbald, confirmed by Theobald, Archbishop of Canterbury; Augustinian Canons Regular independent from before 1260–80; dissolved 1536; granted to Sir John Harrington 1538/9; site now in private ownership as Manor Farm; church restored and now in parochial use	The Abbey Church of Saint Andrew, Owston ____________________; Osulveston Priory
Rothley Temple		Knights Templar founded 1231: manor granted by Henry III; chapel built c.1240; Knights Hospitaller transferred 1312 (1313); dissolved before 1489 (1540); transferred to the Crown; granted to Babington family; manor house built on site	Rothley Preceptory
Swinford Preceptory		Knights Hospitaller founded before 1199: (granted before the reign of King John); under Dalby before 1220; separate camera under a seneschal 1338; dissolved 1538	
Ulverscroft Priory		Augustinian Eremites founded 1134: land granted by Ranulph de Gernon, Earl of Chester; Augustinian Canons Regular founded before c.1174(?) by Robert, Earl of Leicester; still referred to as a hermitage c.1220; suppression avoided 1536; dissolved 15 September 1539; now in private ownership without public access	St Mary
Ulverscroft Monastery		uncertain order and foundation	

Return to top of page

=== Lincolnshire ===
(For references and location detail see List of monastic houses in Lincolnshire)

Foundation	Image	Communities and provenance	Formal name or dedication and alternative names
Alkborough Priory ^{+}		Benedictine monks dependent on Spalding; founded 1052: granted to Spalding by Thorold; granted to Peterborough Cathedral (then Northamptonshire, but from 1974 in county of Cambridgeshire) by Abbot Brand between 1066 and 1069; alien house: cell 1074; dissolved 1220; partly rebuilt after the Reformation	St John the Baptist
Alvingham Priory ^^{/$}		Gilbertine Canons and Canonesses — double house founded 1148-54 (during the reign of Stephen or Henry II) possibly by William de Friston, Hugh de Scotene, or Hamelin the Dean or Robert Cheiney, Bishop of Lincoln; dissolved 29 September 1538; granted to Edward, Lord Clinton 1551/2; subsequently in parochial use; now redundant	St Mary
Aslackby Preceptory ^		Knights Templar founded c.1164 (early in the reign of Henry II (or Richard I)) by John le Mareschal: church of Aslackby and chapel granted to the Templars by Hubert de Rye 1164; Knights Hospitaller transferred 1308-12, under Temple Bruer; granted to Lord Edward Clinton 1543/4; remains incorporated into 18th century Temple Farmhouse built on site; gatehouse demolished as unsafe 1891	Aslakeby Hospital
Axholme Priory		Carthusian monks founded 1395-6: projected before 1389 by Thomas Mowbray, Earl of Nottingham, Earl Marshall of England; built from 1397 on the site of a Premonstratensian chapel; incorporated into Carthusian order 1432; founded 1397-8; dissolved 18 June 1538; granted to John Candysshe (Candish) of Westbutterwick and converted into manor house	The House of the Visitation of St Mary Virgin, Axholme ____________________; Epworth in the Isle of Axholme Priory; Axholme Charterhouse; Low Melwood Priory
Bardney monastery		Saxon monastery founded before 697 by Æthelred, King of Mercia (becoming a monk and abbot here) destroyed in raids by the Danes 870; Benedictine priory built on site (see immediately below)	
Bardney Abbey		Benedictine monks alien house: dependent on Charroux; priory founded 1087, on site of Saxon monastery (see immediately above); independent: raised to abbey status 1115/6; dissolved 1538; granted to Sir Robert Tirwhit; now in ownership of Bardney Parochial Council, with public access	The Priory of Saint Peter, Saint Paul and Saint Oswald The Abbey of Saint Peter and Saint Paul
Barlings Abbey, earlier site		Premonstratensian Canons daughter house of Newsham; founded 1154-5 by Ralph de Haya; transferred to new site shortly after (see immediately below); earlier site becoming a grange of the new abbey	The Abbey Church of the Blessed Virgin Mary, Barlings
Barlings Abbey		Premonstratensian Canons daughter house of Newsham; (community founded at earlier site (see immediately above) 1154-5); transferred here shortly after foundation; dissolved 1537; granted to Charles, Duke of Suffolk	The Abbey Church of the Blessed Virgin Mary, Barlings ____________________; Oxney Abbey
Barrow Monastery		Benedictine? monks founded between 669 and 672 by Wulfhere, King of Mercia and St Chad, Bishop of Lichfield; suggested to have been a minster or secular canons' foundation; destroyed in raids by the Danes c.870	Barrow-on-Humber Monastery; Ad Bavuae Monastery
Barton-upon-Humber Minster		Saxon minster monks or secular canons collegiate founded 10th century	
Belvoir Priory	Historical county location. See entry under Leicestershire		
Bonby Priory		Benedictine monks alien house: cell/grange, dependent on St Fromond; founded after 1199 dissolved before 1403; granted to Beauvale, Nottinghamshire after 1403; became parochial church prior to the dissolution; restored 1894	St Andrew
Boston Austin Friars		Augustinian Friars (under the Limit of Lincoln) founded 1317/8; dissolved 1539; granted to the Mayor and burgesses of Boston 1545/6	Austin Priors
Boston Blackfriars		Dominican Friars (under the Visitation of York) founded before 1288 (1222); church and other buildings were destroyed by fire during the chamberlain's riot 1287-8; dissolved 1538 (1539); granted to Charles, Duke of Suffolk 1540/1; Shodfriars Hall and Blackfriars Hall (both pictured) incorporate remains of the monastic house	
Boston Greyfriars		Franciscan Friars Minor, Conventual (under the Custody of York) founded before 1268; dissolved 1539; granted to the Mayor and burgesses of Boston 1545/6	
Boston Whitefriars, earlier site		Carmelite Friars founded 1293 by Sir ____ Orreby, Kt.; transferred to new site (see immediately below) 1307 (1308)	Skirbeck Whitefriars
Boston Whitefriars		Carmelite Friars transferred to from earlier site (see immediately above) 1307 (1308); dissolved 1539; granted to the Mayor and burgesses of Boston 1545/6	
Boston Priory		Benedictine monks dependent on St Mary's, York; founded 1089 (before 1098): Alan Rufus granted church of St Botolph to St Mary's; dissolved before 1291? (c.1300); Parish Church of St Botolph built on site 1309-c.1520; Knights Hospitaller purchased advowson from St Mary's 1480, church refounded as collegiate; church restored 1845 by George Gilbert Scott, 1851-3 by George Place and by Sir Charles Nicholson in 1929	
Bottesford Camera		Knights Templar dissolved 1308-12; Knights Hospitaller refounded 1308-12; leased 1338; 17th century manor house built on site	
Bourne Abbey ^{+}		Augustinian Canons Regular — Arroaisian founded 1138 by Baldwin Fitz Gilbert de Clare, who invited canons to settle at Bourne and granted St Peter's Church, land and resources; dissolved 1536 (1539); granted to Richard Cotton 1538/9 the church, as since modified, in parochial use	The Abbey Church of Saint Peter and Saint Paul, Bourne ____________________; Bourn Abbey
Bridge End Priory ^{$}		Gilbertine Canons founded before 1199 (during the reign of John) by Godwin, a citizen of Lincoln; burned 1445, becoming a cell of Semprimgham after 1445; dissolved 1538; granted to Edward, Lord Clinton 1541/2; masonry used in construction of Priory Farm (50 m to the north); only cropmarks visible on site	The Priory Church of Saint Saviour at Bridgend in Horbling ____________________; Holland Bridge Priory; Hollandbridge Priory
Broadholme Priory ^{$}		Premonstratensian canonesses (initially with canons and lay brothers) founded before 1154 by Agnes de Camville, land granted by her husband, Peter of Goxhill (or possibly in the reign of Stephen by the abbot and canons of Newsham); dissolved 1536	St Mary ____________________; Brodholm Priory
Bullington Priory ^{$}		Gilbertine Canons and Canonesses — double house founded 1148-1154 by Simon de Kyme (FitzWilliam); dissolved 26 September 1538; granted to Charles, Duke of Suffolk 1538/9; earthworks and cropmarks remain	The Priory Church of Saint Mary, Bullington
Burwell Priory		Benedictine monks alien house: cell, dependent on La Grande-Sauve; founded (before) 1100-7 ("by the Lords of Kyme"): church granted by Ansgot of Burwell; dissolved 1427; granted to Charles, Duke of Suffolk 1544/5; parochial church of St Michael (pictured) possibly tied to, and adjacent to the monastic house	St Michael
Bytham Abbey		Cistercian monks daughter house of Fountains, Yorkshire; founded 23 May 1147 by William le Gros, Count of Albemarle; transferred to Vaudey after 1149(?)	
Cammeringham Priory		Premonstratensian Canons alien house: daughter house of Blanchelande (Normandy); founded c.1192 by Richard de Haya and his wife Maud; sold to Cistercians of Hulton, (Staffordshire) in 1396; Cistercian monks refounded 1396; granted to Robert de Tirwhit 1545/6; 18th century manor house built on its cellary range	St Michael ____________________; Cameringham Priory
Catley Priory ^{$}		Gilbertine Canons and Canonesses — double house founded 1146/(1148)-1154 by Peter de Belingey (Billinghay); dissolved 1538; granted to Robert Carr, of Sleford 1539/40	The Gilbertine priory of St Mary, Catley ____________________; Catterley Priory
Covenham Priory		Benedictine monks alien house: cell, dependent on St-Calais; founded c.1082 by William the Conqueror at the instance of William de St Carilef (St Calais), Bishop of Durham; transferred to Kirkstead 1303	The Priory Church of Saint Mary, Covenham ____________________; Coverham St Mary's Priory
Croyland Monastery ^{#}		Saxon Benedictine? monks founded after 716/757 by Æthelbald, King of Mercia; destroyed in raids by the Danes 870; Benedictine monastery built on site (see immediately below)	
Croyland Abbey ^{+}, Crowland		Benedictine monks restored and rebuilt 948 by King Edred; founded 971 built on site of earlier monastery (see immediately above); dissolved 1539; eastern side of church destroyed; part of church now in parochial use as the Parish Church and part in ruins	The Priory Church of Saint Mary the Virgin, Saint Bartholomew and Saint Guthlac, Crowland ____________________; Crowland Abbey
Deeping St James Priory ^{+}		Benedictine monks priory cell, dependent on Thorney, Cambridgeshire; founded 1139 by Baldwin Fitz Gilbert (Baldwin Fil. De Gilsberti); dissolved before 1539; granted to the Duke of Norfolk 1540/1; priory church now in parochial use as the Parish Church of St James	St James ____________________; Deeping Priory; Deping Priory
Eagle Preceptory ^{#}		Knights Templar — hospital and preceptory founded before 1154 by King Stephen; dissolved 1308-12; Knights Hospitaller refounded 1312; dissolved 1540; granted to Thomas, Earl of Rutland and Robert Tirwhit 1541/2	Egle Hospital
Elsham Priory ^{#}		hospital founded before 1160; Augustinian Canons Regular founded before 1166 by Beatrice de Amundeville; dissolved 1536; granted to Charles, Duke of Suffolk 1538/9	The Hospital of SS Mary and Edmund at Elsham ____________________; Ellesham Priory; Ellesham Priory; Allesham Priory
Fosse Priory		Cistercian nuns founded before 1184 by the inhabitants of Torksey; given as Benedictine; dissolved 11 July 1539; granted to Edward, Lord Clinton 1551/2	Torksey Nunnery
Freiston Priory ^{+}		Benedictine monks priory cell, dependent on Crowland; founded after 1114: church of St James granted to Crowland by Alan de Creun; dissolved 1539; part of church now in parochial use	St James
Gokewell Priory		Cistercian nuns founded before 1148(?) (before 1185) by William de Alta Ripa; house disclaimed by Cistercian General Chapter 1268; dissolved 1536; granted to Sir William Tirwhit 1551-2; site now occupied by the derelict buildings of Gokewell Priory Farm	Gokwelle Priory
Grantham Greyfriars		Franciscan Friars Minor, Conventual (under the Custody of Oxford) founded before 1290: Pope Nicholas IV granted indulgences to penitents; dissolved 1539; Robert Bocher and David Vincent 1541/2	
Great Limber Priory, Limber Magna		Cistercian monks alien house: grange?, dependent on Aunay-sur-Odon, Normandy; founded before 1157 by Richard de Humet; dissolved 1393: sold by the abbot of Aunay to the priory of St Anne, Coventry; transferred to Knights Hospitaller (see immediately below)	Lemburgh Magna Priory
Great Limber Preceptory, Limber Magna ^{$}		probably Knights Hospitaller camera/grange refounded 1393 on site of Cistercian grange (see immediately above); dissolved; granted to John Bellew and others 1544/5; post-medieval house built on site; cropmarks remain	
Greenfield Priory		Cistercian nuns founded before 1153 by Eudo de Greinesby and his son Ralph; house disclaimed by Cistercian general chapter 1268; dissolved 1536; granted to Sir Henry Stanley and Lord Strange 1567/70	
Grimsby Abbey		Augustinian Canons Regular founded 1132(?) (1123-33) by Henry I; dissolved 1536; granted to Sir Thomas Henneage 1544/5; precise location unknown but evidence suggest the grounds of a country house named 'The Abbey'	The Abbey Church of Saint Augustine and Saint Olaf ____________________; Wellow Abbey
Grimsby Nunnery		Augustinian Canonesses — under the protection of the Canons at Wellow by Grimsby founded before 1184 by an ancestor of Henry IV (probably Henry II); given as Benedictine before 1185; damaged by fire 1311, and by fire and flood 1459; dissolved 15 September 1539; granted 1542/3	St Leonard ____________________; Grimesby Nunnery
Grimsby Austin Friars		Augustinian Friars (under the Limit of Lincoln) founded 1293 (before 1304) by William Fraunk with royal licence; dissolved March 1539, surrendered to Richard Ingworth, Bishop of Dover; granted to Austin Porter and John Bellow 1542/3	Austin Friars
Grimsby Greyfriars		Franciscan Friars Minor, Conventual (under the Custody of York) probably founded before 1240; dissolved 1538; granted to John Bellew and Robert Brokesby 1546/7	Grey Friars
Hagnaby Abbey		Premonstratensian Canons daughter of Welbeck, Nottinghamshire; founded 1175-6 by Lady Agnes, widow of Herbert de Orreby, in his memory,; independent: raised to abbey status 1250; dissolved 1536; granted to John Freeman, of London 1538/9; post-medieval house built on site; masonry from monastic buildings reputedly used in construction of St Andrew's Church, Hanna-cum-Hagnaby (pictured)	The Priory Church of Saint Thomas Martyr of Canterbury The Abbey Church of Saint Thomas Martyr of Canterbury ____________________; Hagneby Abbey
Haugham Priory		Benedictine monks alien house: dependent on St-Sever founded after 1080 and before 1101 by Hugh, Earl of Chester; dissolved 1397; granted to the Carthusians at St Mary's, Coventry; Carthusian monks refounded 1397; dissolved 1539?; granted to John Bellew and John Broxholm 1545/6	Hagham Priory
Haverholme Priory		Cistercian monks — from Fountains, Yorkshire founded 1137, land granted to Fountains by Alexander, Bishop of Lincoln; transferred to the Gilbertines at Louth Park 1139; Gilbertine nuns dissolved 1538?; granted to Lord Clinton 1538/9	Haverholm Priory
Henes Cell		Benedictine monks cell (/hermitage or grange?) of York	Haines Cell
Horkstow Camera		Knights Templar cell, dependent on Willoughton; founded before 1338	
Hough Priory ^{#}		Augustinian Canons Regular alien house: dependent on Notre-Dame-du-Voeu-Cherbourg; founded c.1164; dissolved c.1414; granted to the Carthusians at Mount Grace, Yorkshire; granted to John, Lord Russell 1541/2; site located to the south of All Saints Church	Hagh Priory; Haugh Priory
Humberston Abbey ^{#}		Tironensian monks — from Hambye founded c.1160 (during the reign of Henry II) by William Fitz Ralph (William Hermeri); Benedictine monks refounded after 1413; dissolved 1536; granted to John Cheke, Esq. 1551/2; site now occupied by medieval St Peter's Church (no evidence of this having been the abbey church)	St Mary and St Peter ____________________; Humberestone Abbey; Humbereston Abbey
Hirst Priory ^{#}		Augustinian Canons Regular priory cell, dependent on Nostell; founded before 1135 by Nigel d'Albini; dissolved 1540 (1539); granted to John, Earl of Warwick 1547/8	St Mary ____________________; Hyrest Priory
Ikanho monastery		alternative suggested location near Boston (see entry under Suffolk); Saxon Benedictine? monks founded near Boston; (alternatively founded 653-4 by St Botolph at The Anchorage on the Alde Estuary at Iken, Suffolk) destroyed in raids but apparently never rebuilt	St Botolph
Kirkstead Cell		possible hermitage or anchorite cell preceding the abbey	
Kirkstead Abbey, earlier site		Cistercian monks — from Fountains, Yorkshire founded 2 February 1139 by Hugh Brito, Lord of Tattershal; transferred to new site (see immediately below) between 1160 and 1175	
Kirkstead Abbey		Cistercian monks — from Fountains, Yorkshire (community founded at earlier site (see immediately above) 2 February 1139); transferred here 1187; founded by Robert, son of the founder of the earlier site; dissolved 1537; granted to Charles, Duke of Suffolk 1538/9; capella ante portas in use as parochial church	
Knaith Priory		Cistercian nuns (or possibly initially Benedictine nuns) founded c.1180 (or after 1135) by Reyner Evermere; Cistercian nuns by 1347, with priest brothers acting as chaplains (possibly Premonstratensian Canons) recorded by some as Benedictine dissolved 1539; granted to Sir Thomas Henneage 1539/40	The Priory Church of Saint Mary, Knaith ____________________; Heynings Priory; Heyninges Priory
Kyme Priory ^{+}		Augustinian Canons Regular founded c.1150 (before 1156) by Philip de Kyme, Steward of Gilbert, Earl of Lincoln; dissolved 6 July 1539; granted to Thomas, Earl of Rutland, and Robert Tirwhit 1541/2; remains incorporated into St Mary and All Saints parish church	The Priory Church of the Blessed Virgin Mary, Kyme ____________________; South Kyme Priory
Legbourne Priory		Cistercian nuns transferred from Karledale, Kedington or Halington founded after 1150 by Robert fitz Gilbert of Tathwell; sometimes referred to as an abbey; with regular priests or brethren 12th century to 14th century; also given as Augustinian and Premonstratensian dissolved before Michaelmas 1536; briefly restored during the Lincolnshire rebellion; dissolved; granted to Thomas Henneage 1540/1	St Mary ____________________; Lekeburn Priory
Lincoln Austin Friars		Augustinian Friars (under the Limit of Lincoln) founded c.1269-70: protection granted by Henry III 2 January 1270; dissolved 1539; granted to John Bellew and John Broxholm 1545-6	
Lincoln Blackfriars		Dominican Friars (under the Visitation of York) founded before 1238; dissolved 1539; granted to John Bellew and John Broxholm 1545-6; Technical College built on site 1931	
Lincoln Commandery		Knights Hospitaller founded before 1257: reference implies existence of commandery or bailiwick; evidently ceased before 1338	
Lincoln Friars of the Sack		Friars of the Sack founded before c.1266: location granted by Henry III; abandoned (?)before 1307; chapel 1307; chapel served by secular chaplains 1327; St Peter's College or Chantry 1359	
Lincoln Greyfriars		Franciscan Friars Minor, Conventual (under the Custody of York) founded c.1230: locality granted by William de Bellingworth (Beningworth), subdean of Lincoln (confirmation granted 7 February 1230-1; the old Guildhall assigned 1237); dissolved 1539; granted to J. Pope 1544-5; free Grammar School founded 1568 by Robert Morson; became the Mechanics Institute 1883; restored 1905; opened as the City Museum 1907	
Lincoln Whitefriars		Carmelite Friars founded before 1260 (1269) by Odo of Kilkenny; church demolished and rebuilt 15th century; dissolved 1539; granted to John Broxholm 1544/5; kitchen remained in domestic use until 17th century	
Lincoln — St Katherine's Priory		Gilbertine Canons founded after 1148; dissolved 1538; granted to Charles, Duke of Suffolk 1538/9	
Lincoln — St Mary Magdalen Priory		Benedictine monks cell, dependent on St Mary's, York; refounded from Rumburgh, Suffolk by Alan of Richmond c.1135(?); dissolved 1539; granted to John Bellew and John Broxholm 1545/6; remains now within a public park	St Mary's Priory; de Nicholia (presumably 'Lincolnia')
Long Bennington Priory ^{#}		Cistercian monks alien house: (?)grange, dependent on Savigny; founded1200(?) by Ralph de Filgeries; referred to as an alien priory, apparently a grange; dissolved after 1403; granted to the Carthusians at Mount Grace, Yorkshire 1421 (confirmed 1462); granted 1532/3; a house called 'Priory House' near the church is purported to be located near the site of the priory	Long Benyngton Priory; Long Bennington Grange
Louth Park Abbey		Cistercian monks dependent on Fountains, Yorkshire; (community founded at Haverholme 1137); transferred here 2 February 1139: land granted by Alexander, Bishop of Lincoln; dissolved 8 September 1536; granted to Sir Henry Stanley 1569/70	The Abbey Church of Saint Mary, Louth Park ____________________; Louth Abbey
Maltby Preceptory		(Knights Templar? founded c.1135-54); Knights Hospitaller founded 1312 by Ranulf, Earl of Chester; united with Skirbeck in 1386; annexed to the estate of the prior of England 1445; dissolved 1540	
Markby Priory		Augustinian Canons Regular founded c.1154-1189 (during the reign of Henry II) by Ralph fitz Gilbert; dissolved 1536; granted to Charles, Duke of Suffolk 1538/9	St Peter ____________________; Markeby Priory
Melwood Priory		Saxon monastery at Epworth	Low Melwood Priory; Melwood Priory; The Priory in the Wood
Mere		Knights Hospitaller — member of Willoughton	
Minting Priory		Benedictine monks alien house: dependent on St-Benoit-sur-Loire; founded c.1129, granted by Ranulph de Meschines, Earl of Chester; dissolved 1414; granted to Mount Grace 1421; granted 1542/3	St Andrew
Newbo Abbey, Sedgefield		Premonstratensian Canons — from Newsham daughter house of Newsham; founded 1198 by Richard de Malebisse; dissolved 1536; granted to Sir John Markham 1537/8	Neubo Abbey
Newsham Abbey		Premonstratensian Canons daughter house of Licques; founded 1143 by Peter de Gousel; dissolved 1536; granted to Charles, Duke of Suffolk 1538/9; likely to have remained unoccupied after suppression	St Mary and St Martial ____________________; Newhouse Abbey; Neus Abbey
Newstead Priory		hospital founded before 1200 by William d'Albini III; Augustinian Canons Regular refounded before 1247 probably by the son of William d'Albini; dissolved 1536	Newstead by Stamford Priory
Newstead-on-Ancholme Priory		Gilbertine Canons founded 1171(?), granted by Henry II; dissolved 2 October 1538; granted to Robert Henneage 1539/40	The Holy Trinity ____________________; Newstede-on-Alcolm Priory; Newstead Priory; Newstead on Anchcolme Priory
Nocton Priory		Augustinian Canons Regular founded 12th century (probably during the reign of Stephen) by Robert Darcy (de Arecy); dissolved 1536; Sir Henry Stanley, Lord Strange constructed a secular house from the ruins 1569-70; house abandoned end of 17th century and the buildings demolished	St Mary Magdalene ____________________; Nocton Park Priory
North Hykeham Priory		Benedictine monks alien house: dependency unknown ("priory, manor or lordship of Ikham"); foundation unknown; dissolution unknown; granted to God's House, Cambridge	Hykeham Priory
North Ormsby Priory		Gilbertine Canons founded 1148-54 by Gilbert fitz Robert of Ormsby with the consent of William le Gros, Count of Albemarle; dissolved 30 September 1538	St Mary ____________________; Nun Ormsby Priory; Ormsby Priory; Northomersby Priory
Nun Cotham Priory ^{$}		Cistercian nuns founded 1147-53 (probably during the reign of Stephen) by Alan de Muncells (Moncels); with regular priests or brethren c.1150 to 14th century; recorded as Gilbertine c.1200; house disclaimed by Cistercian General Chapter 1268; dissolved 9 July 1539; granted to Edward Shipwith 1540/1; house built on site, of which only earthworks remain	St Mary ____________________; Nuncotham Priory; Cotham Priory; Nuncoton Priory
Orford Priory ^{$}		Premonstratensian Canonesses founded c.1155-60 by Ralph de Albini; with regular priests or brethren before 1160-14th century; dissolved 1539; granted to Robert Tirwhit 1539/40; house built on site, of which only earthworks remain	Irford Priory
Partney Monastery		Saxon monastery founded before 700; suggested to have been a minster; probably destroyed in raids by the Danes c.870	
Partney Cell		Benedictine monks founded before 1318: chapel of St Mary Magdalene granted to the monks of Bardney by Gilbert of Ghent (confirmed by his son Walter 1115); hospital founded early-14th century; became cell of Bardney; dissolved before 16th century(?) (referred to as a manor of Bardney 1535)	Hospital of St Mary Magdalene
Repingas Monastery, Rippingale?		Benedictine(?) monks dependent on Peterborough, Northamptonshire (Cambridgeshire); founded c.690; destroyed in raids by the Danes 870	Hrepingas Monastery
Revesby Abbey ^{$}		Savignac monks — from Rievaulx, Yorkshire daughter house of Rievaulx founded 9 August 1143 by William de Romara, Earl of Lincoln, his wife and son; Cistercian monks orders merged 17 September 1147; dilapidated by dissolved 23 March 1539; granted to Charles, Duke of Suffolk 1538/9; remains comprise earthworks in a field in private ownership without public access; (the current 19th century building north of the village of Revesby named 'Revesby Abbey' is located in a deerpark which was in the ownership of the monastic house)	St Mary and St Laurence
Sandtoft Priory		Benedictine monks cell, dependent on St Mary's, York; founded after 1147/before 1186 by Roger de Mobray (or Godfrey de la Wyrch); dissolved after 1291	
Sempringham Priory, earlier site		Gilbertine Canons and nuns founded 1131 by Sir Gilbert, of Sempringham (St Gilbert of Sempringham); transferred to new site (see immediately below) c.1139; now in parochial use	St Andrew
Sempringham Priory ^{#}		Gilbertine Canons and Canonesses — double house (community founded at earlier site (see immediately above) c.113; transferred here 1139, land granted by Gilbert de Gant (St Gilbert of Sempringham's feudal lord); dissolved 1538; granted to Edward, Lord Clinton 1538/9; mansion later built on site no longer exists	St Mary
Sixhills Priory		Gilbertine Canons and Canonesses — double house; founded between 1148 and 1154 by Robert? de Gresley (Grelle) (or his son); dissolved 29 September 1538; granted to Thomas Henneage 1538/9; remains incorporated into later house	Sixle Priory; Sixhill Priory
Skendleby Priory		Benedictine monks cell dependent on Bardney; founded c.1318 (upon his resignation as Abbot of Bardney, Robert de Waynfleet was assigned the cells of Partney and Skendleby)	
Skirbeck Commandery		hospital founded 1130 by Sir John Malton; Knights Hospitaller granted 1230 by Sir Thomas Multon; dissolved 1408(?); granted to Charles, Duke of Suffolk 1541/2	Skirbeke Hospital; St Leonard's Hospital
Spalding Priory		Benedictine monks cell, dependent on Crowland; founded 1052 by Thorold de Buckenhale; dissolved c.1071; alien house: dependent on St-Nicholas, Angers founded 1174; became denizen: independent from 1397; dissolved 1539; granted to Sir John Cheke 1549/50	
Stainfield Priory		Benedictine nuns founded c.1154 by Henry Percy; dissolved 1536; granted to Robert Tirwhit 1537/8; Stainfield Hall built on the site after dissolution	Stanfeld Priory
Stamford All Saints' College		Benedictine Monks dependent on Crowland; founded 1109	
Stamford Austin Friars		Augustinian Friars (under the Limit of Lincoln) on the earlier friary of Friars of the Sack; projected 1340 by Edward III founded 1343 (1342) by Robert of Woodhouse, Archdeacon of Richmond received permission from Clement VI for the founded; school of theology 1392; dissolved October 1538	
Stamford Blackfriars ^{#}		Dominican Friars (under the Visitation of Cambridge) founded before 1241; dissolved 7 October 1538	
Stamford Cell in Burghley Park		Benedictine Monks dependent on Peterborough, Northamptonshire (Cambridgeshire); founded c.1200	
Stamford Friars of the Sack		Friars of the Sack founded before 1274; dissolved 1300; Austin Friars Friary founded here	
Stamford Hall		Gilbertine Canons founded 1292; dissolved c.1334;	
Stamford Greyfriars		Franciscan Friars Minor, Conventual (under the Custody of Oxford) founded before 1230: Henry III granted fuel January 1230; dissolved 8 October 1538	
Stamford Whitefriars		Carmelite Friars founded before 1268; dissolved 8 October 1538	
Stamford Monastery		Saxon monks founded 658(?); destroyed in raids by the Danes 9th century; Benedictine priory built on site (see immediately below)	
Stamford — St Leonard's Priory		Benedictine monks cell, dependent on Durham; founded after 1083 by William, Abbot of Peterborough on site of a Saxon monastery (see immediately above); dissolved 1538; granted to Richard Cecil 1540/1	Stanford Priory
Stixwould Priory ^{$}		Cistercian nuns founded c.1135 (c.1131) (early in the reign of Stephen or late in the reign of Henry I) by Lucy, dowager Countess of Chester; with regular priests or brethren from 12th century to after 1308; Benedictine nuns — from Stainfield refounded house disclaimed by Cistercian General Chapter 1268; also given as Gilbertine Canons and Canonesses ?before 1308; dissolved 1536; Benedictine nuns refounded 1536; Premonstratensian Canonesses refounded 1537; dissolved 1537-9; granted to Robert Dighton 1540/1; remains comprise earthworks	Stykeswold Priory
Stow Monastery		Saxon monks — secular college founded before 1016 (c.975 in the time of Bishop Aelfnoth) or c.1005 by Eadnoth, Bishop of Dorchester, granted by Earl Leofric and Godiva 1055-7; ceased at the Conquest, 1066 (1067); Benedictine abbey built on site (see immediately below)	
Stow Abbey		Benedictine monks community founded at Eynsham, Oxfordshire 1005) transferred here 1091; founded 1091, on the site of Saxon monastery (see immediately above); transferred to Eynsham c.1094/5 (1109?); conventual church in parochial use from c.1094/5	The Abbey Church of Saint Mary
St Æthelreda's nunnery, Stow Green		Anglo-Saxon royal foundation at Stow Green 7th to 9th century	St Æthelthryth
Swineshead Abbey		Savignac monks daughter house of Furness; founded 1 February 1135 by Robert de Gresley (Griesley); Cistercian monks orders merged 17 September 1147; dissolved 1536; granted to Edward, Lord Clinton 1552/3; farmhouse built on site by John Lockton, incorporating monastic remains	St Mary ____________________; Swinshed Abbey
Temple Bruer Preceptory		Knights Templar founded before 1185 by William of Ashby; dissolved 1308-12; Knights Hospitaller transferred c.1312; dissolved 1540-1; granted to Charles, Duke of Suffolk 1541/2	
Thornholme Priory		Augustinian Canons Regular founded by King Stephen; dissolved 1536	The Priory Church of the Blessed Virgin Mary, Thornholme ____________________; Thornholm Priory
Thornton Abbey		Augustinian Canons Regular priory founded 1139 by William le Gros, Count of Albemarle and Lord of Holderness; raised to abbey status 1148 dissolved 12 December 1539 refounded as secular priests' college suppressed by Edward VI 1547; demolished by Sir Vincent Skinner after 1602; stately home built on site by Skinner collapsed reportedly c.1611; (EH)	The Abbey Church of the Blessed Virgin Mary, Thornton ____________________; Thornton-upn-the-Humber Abbey
Threekingham Nunnery, Tricengeham?		Saxon nuns founded c.680 by St Werburgh; (formerly identified as Trentham, Staffordshire) destroyed in raids by the Danes c.870	Threckingham Nunnery
Throckenholt Priory		hermitage and chapel Benedictine monks cell, dependent on Thorney; founded 1154-69 (during the reign of Henry I), granted to Thorney by Nigel, Bishop of Ely; dissolved 1190	Trockenholt Priory
Thwaite Priory ^		Augustinian Canons Regular cell, dependent on Thornton; founded before 1440; dissolved before 1536(?); incorporated into 18th century cottage named 'Thwaite Hall'	
Torksey Priory ^{#}		Augustinian Canons Regular founded possibly by Henry II, who granted privileges, or by King John; dissolved 1536; granted to Sir Philip Hobby 1544/5	The Priory Church of Saint Leonard, Torksey ____________________; St Leonard's Priory; Torkesey Priory
Tunstall Priory		Gilbertine Canons (and Canonesses?) — possible double house founded before 1164 (during the reign of Stephen) by Reginald de Crevequer; united to Bullington by his son William before 1189	St Mary ____________________; Redbourne Priory
Tupholme Abbey		Premonstratensian Canons daughter house of Newsham; founded 1155-6 by Alan de Neville and Gibert, his brother; dissolved 1536	The Blessed Virgin Mary
Vaudey Abbey		Cistercian monks — from Bytham daughter house of Fountains, Yorkshire; founded 23 May 1147 by William, Earl of Albemarle (after 1149: land granted by Geoffrey de Brachecurt and Gilbert de Gant, Earl of Lincoln); dissolved 1536; granted to Charles, Duke of Suffolk 1538/9	
West Ravendale Priory		Premonstratensian Canons alien house: dependent on Beauport, Brittany; founded c.1202: chapel etc. granted by Alan fitz Henry, Count of Brittany; dissolved 1389 (before 1413); lands granted to Joan, consort of Henry IV 1413; granted to Southwell Collegiate Church 1452	
Whaplode Friary		Crutched Friars founded 1244-7(?); incited after 1238?; abandoned 1260	
Willoughton Priory		Benedictine monks alien house: (?)grange, dependent on St Nicholas, Angers; founded before 1148: land granted to St Nicholas, Angers by Empress Matilda; dissolved 1403; granted to King's College, Cambridge	Willowton Priory
Willoughton Preceptory		Knights Templar founded after 1135 (during the reign of Stephen) by Roger de Builli (Buslei); dissolved 1308-12; Knights Hospitaller transferred after 1312; dissolved 1540; granted to John Cock and John Thurgood 1345/6	Willowton Preceptory; Wilketone Preceptory
Wilsford Priory ^{#}		Benedictine monks alien house: cell, dependent on Bec-Hellouin and the priory of Envermeu; founded between 1135 and 1154 (during the reign of Stephen) by Hugh de Evermue (Evremewe) granted to Bourne c.1401; Augustinian Canons Regular — Arroasian refounded c.1401; dissolved 1536; granted to Charles, Duke of Suffolk 1538/9	Willesford Priory
Winghale Priory		Benedictine monks alien house: (?)grange, dependent on Séez; founded before 1115; dissolved 1400; granted to a secular clerk; granted to Trinity College, Cambridge	Wenghale Priory
Witham Preceptory		Knights Templar founded before 1164 by Margaret de Perci, Ubert de Ria and others; dissolved 1308-12; Knights Hospitaller transferred 1312; merged with Temple Bruer	South Witham Preceptory

Return to top of page

=== Merseyside ===
(For references and location detail see List of monastic houses in Merseyside)

Foundation	Image	Communities & provenance	Formal name or dedication & alternative names
Birkenhead Priory		Benedictine monks founded c.1150 by Hamon de Masci, Baron of Dunham Massey; dissolved 1536; granted to Ralph Worseley 1544/5	St James the Great ____________________; Birkenhedde Priory; Bircheved Priory; Byrkett Priory; Birket-wood Priory
Bromborough Monastery ^{+}		built by Aethelflaed, apparently incorporating an earlier foundation; (also given as located in Devon) granted to the Abbey of St Werburgh 1152; irrevocably dilapidated before 1827; demolished 1827; successor church built on site from monastic material; demolished 1863–4; new church built just to the south of the site	
Hilbre Island Monastery		Benedictine monks founded after 1093; cell of Our Lady of monks, Chester; chapel (built before 1081) granted to Chester; apparently merely a hermitage, although a prior is attributed dissolved 1539	St Mary ____________________; Ilbre Monastery; Hilbury Monastery; Holburgh Monastery

Return to top of page

=== Norfolk ===
Foundation	Image	Communities and provenance	Formal name or dedication and alternative names	References and location
Aldeby Priory ^^{(+)}		Benedictine monks dependent on Norwich; founded c.1100-1119 (during the reign of Henry I) by Herbert de Losinga, Bishop of Norwich; lack of evidence for a conventual church infers that the monks officiated at the parochial church of St Mary which was granted to the priory; granted to the Dean and Prebendary of Norwich	The Priory Church of Saint Mary, Aldeby Priory	52°28′43″N 1°35′56″E
Beeston Regis Priory		Augustinian Canons Regular founded c.1216 (about the end of the reign of King John) by Lady Margery de Cressy; Carmelite Friars refounded 1400; dissolved 1539; granted to Sir Edmond Windham and Giles Seafoule 1545/6	The Priory Church of Saint Mary, Beeston Regis ____________________; Beeston Priory	52°56′19″N 1°13′27″E
Binham Priory ^{+}		Benedictine monks priory cell dependent on St Albans Abbey, Hertfordshire; founded c.1091 (before 1093) by Peter de Valoines, manor granted by William the Conqueror; dissolved 1539; granted to Sir Thomas Paston; demolition ensued but the plan to build a mansion was abandoned; nave of conventual church in parochial use as the Priory Church of St Mary and the Holy Cross. Owned by Norfolk Archaeological Trust and English Heritage	The Priory Church of Saint Mary the Virgin, Binham Priory The Priory Church of St Peter and St Paul, Binham?	52°55′12″N 0°56′48″E
Blackborough Priory ^		Benedictine monks founded c.1150 by Roger de Scales and his wife Muriel; Benedictine monks and nuns granted extended for use as a double house by Robert de Scales, son of the founders c.1170(?); Benedictine nuns alone 1200; dissolved 1537; granted to the Bishop of Norwich 1550/1; remains incorporated into a private house	The Priory Church of the Blessed Virgin Mary and Saint Catherine, Blackborough	52°41′54″N 0°28′30″E
Blakeney Friary		Carmelite Friars land granted 1295/6 by Richard Stomer and others with the consent of their lord Sir William Roos; founded 1304-16; buildings completed 1321; dissolved 1538; granted to William Rede 1541/2; granted to Lady Anne Calthorpe; passed to the local Pepys family; remains incorporated into Friarage Farmhouse	Snitterley Whitefriars; Sniterley Whitefriars	Blakeney52°57′19″N 1°01′24″E
Bradmer Friary		Carmelite Friars founded c.1241 (1242-7) by Ralph Hempnale (Hemenhale) and Sir William de Calthrop; transferred to new site at Burnham Norton c.1253		
Bromehill Priory		Augustinian Canons Regular founded before 1224 by Sir Hugh de Plaiz; dissolved 14 May 1528 for Cardinal Thomas Wolsey's college at Ipswich; priory demolished; granted to the Fellows of Christ's College, Cambridge by Edward VI	The Priory Church of the Blessed Virgin Mary and Saint Thomas the Martyr, Bromehill	
Bromholm Priory		Cluniac monks alien house: dependent on Castle Acre Priory; founded 1113 by William de Glanville; direct Cluniac rule c.1195;became denizen: independent from 1390; dissolved 1536; granted to Thomas Woodhouse 1545/6	The Priory Church of St Andrew, Bromholm ____________________; Broomholm Priory	
Burnham Norton Friary		Carmelite Friars (community founded at Bradmer c.1241 (1242-7)); transferred from Bradmer 1253 (1252); dissolved 1538; granted to William, Lord Cobham 1541/2		
Carbrooke Preceptory		possibly Knights Templar possibly founded before 1173 by granted by the husband of Maud, Countess of Clare, with preceptory unfinished; Knights Hospitaller founded c.1182: Maud, Countess of Clare granted churches of St Peter, Great Carbrook and St John the Baptist, Little Carbrook and manor of Carbrook; dissolved 1540; granted to Sir Richard Gresham and Sir Richard Southwell 1543/4	Carbroke Preceptory 52°34′54″N 0°52′42″E	
Carbrook Cell		Sisters of the Order of St John of Jerusalem cell founded unknown, transferred to Buckland c.1180		
Carrow Priory		Benedictine nuns (community founded at Norwich between 1100 and 1135); transferred here 1146, founded by two sisters of the earlier site which was granted land by King Stephen; dissolved 1536; granted to Sir John Shelton 1538; prioress's house incorporated into later residence; remains situated within the grounds of Reckitt & Colman's works	The Priory Church of Saint Mary of Carhowe	
Castle Acre Priory		Cluniac monks alien house: dependent on Lewes, Sussex; founded 1089 (or before 1085) by William de Warenne, 2nd Earl of Surrey;became denizen: independent from sometime between 1351 and 1374; dissolved 22 November 1537; granted to Thomas Howard, Duke of Norfolk 1537/8; priors lodgings retained as a residence; passed into ownership of Sir Edward Coke, and remains in that family; in guardianship of Ministry of Works 1929; (EH)	The Priory Church of Saint Mary, Castle Acre Priory Church of Saint Mary, Saint Peter and Saint Paul ____________________; Castleacre Priory	52°42′00″N 0°41′06″E
Choseley Monastery		Lazarites founded before 1273 (before the reign of Edward I) by the Earl of Gifford; dissolved 1544/5; granted Sir John Dudley, Viscount Lisle		
Coxford Priory		Augustinian Canons Regular (community founded at the church of St Mary, Rudham (East) c.1140); transferred to new site c.1216 (early in the reign of Henry III); dissolved 22 January 1536; granted to Thomas, Duke of Norfolk 1537	Cokesford Priory	
Crabhouse Priory		Augustinian Canonesses founded c.1181 by Roger, prior, and canons of Ranham (Norman's Burrow) with the consent of their founder William de Lesewis (Leseurs) for the anchoress Lena; flooded and temporarily abandoned c.1200; church and many buildings partly rebuilt 1402-4; rebuilt 1420-4; dissolved 1536; granted to Sir John Gage; house named 'Crabb's Abbey' built on site	The Priory Church of the Blessed Virgin Mary and Saint John the Evangelist; St Mary, St John and St Thomas	
Creake Abbey		chapel hospital founded before 1189 (during the reign of Henry II) by Lady Alice de Nerford and her husband Sir Robert who used the chapel to found a hospital; Augustinian Canons Regular founded 1206, the master becoming a canon, changing the hospital to a priory with the consent of the widowed Alice; hospital dedicated to St Bartholomew after(?)1217; raised to abbey status 1231 by Henry III; canons wiped out by plague 1506, abbot survived to 12 December 1506; passed to the Crown 1506; (EH)	The Priory Church of Saint Mary de Pratis ____________________; North Creake Abbey; Creek Abbey	52°55′14″N 0°45′34″E
Custhorpe Cell(?)		Augustinian Canons Regular cell(?) dependent on West Acre; possibly a chapel intermittently served by a canon		52°42′05″N 0°38′41″E
Docking Priory		Benedictine monks alien house: cell or grange dependent on Ivry-la-Bataille; founded 12th century; dissolved 1455; granted as a 'priory' to Eton College 1436? (Note: Docking — granted to Eton in 1436: Dugdale, (1486) Monasticon Anglicanum vi:)		52°53′34″N 0°36′53″E
East Dereham Monastery		Saxon nuns nunnery and probable minster founded before 743 by St Withburga; ?destroyed in raids by the Danes c.870; sole remains are a holy well, reputedly associated with the monastery		
Field Dalling Grange		Savignac monks alien house founded 1138 by Maud de Harscolye: James de Sancto Hylario granted land to the abbey of the Holy Trinity, Savigny; Cistercian monks orders merged 17 September 1147; (referred to as a priory cell, but believed to be a grange); dissolved 1414; granted by the Crown to Epworth Priory; granted to the Spittle-on-the-Street, Lincolnshire; granted to the Carthusians of St. Anne's Priory, Coventry, Warwickshire (West Midlands); granted to the Carthusian priory of Mount Grace 1462; granted to Martyng Hastings and James Borne	Dallingfield Priory; Field-Dalling Priory; Fieldallyng Priory	
Flitcham Priory		Augustinian Canons Regular founded c.1217 (early in the reign of Henry III) by Sir Robert Aguillon (granted to Dametta de Flitcham); in decay by 1528; dissolved 1538; granted to Edward Lord Clinton 1538/9; house built on site 16th century	St Mary ad Fontes	
Gorleston Friary		Augustinian Friars (under the Limit of Cambridge) founded before 1267; William Woderove given as founder 14th century; dissolved 1538, surrendered to Richard Ingworth, Bishop of Dover		
Great Massingham Priory		Augustinian Canons Regular founded before/c.1260 probably by Nicholas le (/de) Syre (originally termed a hospital, with a prior as master); dilapidated 1475-6; refounded as a cell of West Acre; dissolved 1538; granted to Sir Thomas Gresham	St Mary and St Nicholas ____________________; Massingham Magna	
Great Witchingham Grange		Cluniac monks alien house: dependent on Longueville; founded after 1093: manor and other endowments granted by Walter Giffard, 1st Earl of Buckingham; possibly directly supervised by monks from time-to-time dissolved after 1414		
Great Yarmouth — St Nicholas's Priory		Benedictine monks cell dependent on Norwich; founded 1101 by Herbert de Losinga, Bishop of Norwich; Church of St Nicholas was associated with the priory; dissolved 1539; granted to Norwich Cathedral; restored 1835; destroyed by bombing in World War II; restored, currently in parochial use as the Parish Church of St Nicholas; the conventual Great Hall currently in use as Priory School	The Priory Church of Saint Nicholas, Great Yarmouth;	
Great Yarmouth Austin Friary		Augustinian Friars cell? under Gorleston founded 1339?: royal permission granted; existence purported by old tradition dissolution unknown		52°35′11″N 1°43′29″E
Great Yarmouth Blackfriars		Dominican Friars (under the Visitation of Cambridge) founded before 1267 by Sir William Garbridge; inundated by the sea 1287, and sea wall constructed; church destroyed by fire 1525; dissolved 1538; granted to Richard Andrews and Sir Leonard Chamberlain.1542/3		
Great Yarmouth Greyfriars		Franciscan Friars Minor, Conventual (under the Custody of Cambridge) founded after 1226(?)-1271 by Sir William Garbridge; dissolved 1538; granted to Sir Richard Williams, alias Cromwell 1541/2; leased 1582 as a lodging for important visitors, and part used by local civilian militia; site sold to John Woodroffe 1657; later divided and sold; monastic remains incorporated into 17th century and later buildings; remains of the cloister were opened up late 19th century, with other remains restored 1945 and thereafter		
Great Yarmouth Whitefriars		Carmelite Friars founded before 1277 by Edward I; destroyed by fire 1 April 1509; dissolved 1538 by Richard Ingworth, Bishop of Dover; granted to Thomas Denton and Richard Nottingham 1544/5; house built on site 17th century	52°36′30″N 1°43′25″E	
Haddiscoe Preceptory		Knights Templar founded before 1218; dissolved 1308-12		52°30′58″N 1°35′41″E
Heacham Grange		Cluniac monks alien house: grange(?) dependent on Lewes, Sussex; founded before 1088: endowments including mansion and estates granted to Lewes by William de Warenne; cell purported to have existed (evidence disputed) — possibly directly supervised by monks from time-to-time; dissolution unknown		
Hempton Priory		hospital founded before 1135 (during the reign of Henry I) by Roger de St Martin (St Martins), with Richard Ward (who became the first prior when the hospital became a priory); Augustinian Canons Regular founded before 1135; hospital continued to after 1200; dissolved 1536; granted to Sir William Fermer 1545/6	The Priory Church of Saint Stephen, Hempton ____________________; Fakenham Priory; Hampton Priory	
Hickling Priory ^{#}		Augustinian Canons Regular founded 1185 by Theobald de Valentia, son of Robert de Valoines; dissolved 1536; granted to the Bishop of Norwich	The Priory Church of Saint Mary, Saint Augustine and All Saints, Hickling 1545/6	
Hitcham Cell		Cluniac monks founded during the reign of William II by William Warren, Earl of Surrey; dissolved; granted to Thomas, Duke of Norfolk 1537/8		
Horsham St Faith Priory		Benedictine monks (community founded at Kirkscroft 1105); alien house: dependent on Conches; transferred here after 1105; became denizen: independent from 1390; dissolved 1536; granted to Sir Edward Elrington 1543/4	The Priory Church of Saint Faith, Horsham	
Horstead Priory		Benedictine monks alien house: priory or grange? dependent on La Trinitè, Caen; founded c.1090 by William II to nunnery at Caen; nuns appear not to have resided here; probably run by a monk using the title 'prior' dissolved 1414; granted to King's College, Cambridge 1291	Horestead Grange; Horstead Priory	
Ingham Priory^{+}		secular canons collegiate founded c.1355 by Sir Miles Stapleton who was granted licence to enlarge church 1355; Trinitarian Canons founded 1360 abandoned between 1534 and 1536; dissolved 1536; prospective purchaser falsely asserted the house to be of Crutched Friars; granted to the Bishop of Norwich 1544/5; The Swan Inn public house, adjacent to the church, also stands on the site of the priory	The Priory Church of the Holy Trinity and All Saints, Ingham	
King's Lynn Benedictine Priory		Benedictine monks founded 1095; dissolved 1538; granted to the Dean and Chapter of Norwich; site of the prior's house consecrated and incorporated into St Margaret's churchyard early 17th century; demolished apart from small section incorporated into later building	The Priory & Parish Church of Saint Margaret with Saint Mary Magdalen and All the Virgin Saints, King's Lynn The Priory & Parish Church of Saint Margaret with St Nicholas, King's Lynn (from 1101)	
King's Lynn Austin Friars		Augustinian Friars (under the Custody of Cambridge) founded before 1295; dissolved 30 September 1538; granted to John Eyer 1544/5		
King's Lynn Blackfriars		Dominican Friars (under the Visitation of Cambridge) founded before 1256 by Thomas Gedney; dissolved 1539 (1538); granted to John Eyer 1544/5		
King's Lynn Greyfriars		Franciscan Friars Minor, Conventual (under the Custody of Cambridge) founded c.1230, purportedly by Thomas Feltham; dissolved 1538		
King's Lynn Sack Friary		Friars of the Sack founded before 1266; dissolved after 1307		
King's Lynn Whitefriars		Carmelite Friars founded before c.1260, possibly by Lord Bardolph; dissolved 30 September 1538; granted to John Eyer	White Friars, King's Lynn	
Kirkscroft Priory		Benedictine monks alien house: dependent on Conches; founded c.1105 by Robert FitzWalter and his wife Sybil; transferred to new site at Horsham St Faith shortly afterwards	The Blessed Virgin Mary	
Langley Abbey		Premonstratensian Canons daughter house of Alnwick, Northumberland; founded 1198 by Robert Fitz Roger; dissolved 1536; granted to John Berney 1546/7		
Lessingham Priory		Benedictine monks alien house: cell or grange dependent on Bec-Hellouin founded c.1090; dissolved c.1414		
Ling Priory		Benedictine nuns foundation unknown; dissolved c.1160		
Ludham, St Benet's Abbey		hermits founded c.800 by Saxon monks under Suneman (or Prince Horn); destroyed in raids by Danes 870 monks or secular canons collegiate rebuilt c.960 by Wulfric; Benedictine monks refounded by Cnut; never suppressed, granted to the Bishop of Norwich 1536; probably abandoned before 1539	St Benet of Holm Abbey; St Benet's of Hulme Abbey	
Marham Abbey		Cistercian nuns founded 1249 (1251), endowed by the Countess of Arundel; dissolved 1536; granted to Sir Nicholas Hare and Robert Hare 1546/7	The Blessed Virgin Mary, St Barbara and St Edmund, Marham	
Modeney Priory		Benedictine monks founded before 1291; dissolved c.1536; granted to Robert Hogan 1543/4	Modney Priory	
Molycourt Priory		Benedictine monks foundation unknown (pre-Conquest); cell dependent on Ely; granted to Ely 1446; dissolved with Ely 1539; site partly occupied by farmhouse	St Mary Bello Loco ____________________; Mullicourt Priory	
Mountjoy Priory		Benedictine monks cell dependent on Wymondham; founded after 1189; Augustinian Canons Regular granted to Augustinians after 1199 (early in the reign of John) by William de Gyney (Gisnetto/Gisneto); dissolved 1 April 1529 for Cardinal Wolsey's colleges	St Laurence St Mary the Virgin, St Michael and St Laurence ____________________; Monte Jovis Priory	
Narford Cell		Augustinian Canons Regular purported cell dependent on West Acre; officiating in the Chapel of St Thomas a Becket		
Newbridge Hermitage		hermit's chapel founded 1094		
Normansburgh Priory		Augustinian Canons Regular founded c.1160 Cluniac monks alien house: cell dependent on Castle Acre; refounded c.1200; became denizen: independent from sometime between 1351 and 1374; dissolved 1537	The Priory Church of Saint Mary the Virgin and Saint John the Evangelist ____________________; Norman's Burrow Priory	
Norwich Austin Friars		Augustinian Friars (under the Limit of Cambridge) founded after 1277 (apparently)/before 1289; dissolved 29 August 1538; granted to Sir Thomas Henneage and William Lord Willoughby 1548/9		
Norwich Blackfriars, earlier site		Dominican Friars (under the Visitation of Cambridge) founded 1226 by Sir Thomas Gelham; transferred to new site (see immediately below) 1307; property retained by friars; friars retired from new site when destroyed by fire 1413; returned to St Andrew's Hall 1449	Black Hall; Old House	
Blackfriars, Norwich		Dominican Friars (community founded at earlier site (see immediately above ) 1226); licence for acquisition of site granted by Edward II by 1307; transferred here before 1307 destroyed by fire 1413; friars retired to Old Hall (see above); rebuilt; friars returned 1449; dissolved 1538; granted to the Mayor and citizens of Norwich 1540/1; now Blackfriars Hall		
Norwich, Friary de Domina		Friars of St Mary (actually Pied Friars) founded before c.1290 from a legacy granted by Roger de Tybenham; founded before 1274-5; community perished in the Black Death 1349, house becoming private property		
Norwich Friars of the Sack		Friars of the Sack founded c.1258: site secured for the friars in the parish of St Peter Hungate; dissolved before 1307; granted to Dominicans		
Norwich Greyfriars		Franciscan Friars Minor, Conventual (under the Custody of Cambridge) founded 1226 by John de Hastingford in a house in Ciningsford (modern Conisford); dissolved 1538		
Norwich Pied Friars		Pied Friars founded before 1290; dissolved c.1307; granted to the hospital of Beck in Billingford and converted into a chantry and collegiate 14th century which continued until the dissolution		
Norwich Priory		Benedictine nuns founded between 1100 and 1135 (during the reign of Henry I); transferred c.1146 to Carrow	St Mary and St John	
White Friars, Norwich		Carmelite Friars founded 1256 by Philip Cougate of Norwich; dissolved 1538; granted to Richard Andrews and Leonard Chamberlain 1542/3; few visible remains		
Great Hospital, Norwich; St Giles Hospital ^		hospital founded 1249; Augustinian Canons Regular from 1310 the master and brothers wore the Austin canons' habit; much of the medieval fabric survives in the establishment which has been in continual use since foundation	The Great Hospital; Hospital of St Giles	
St Leonard's Priory, Norwich		Benedictine monks founded c.1095 (1096), built by Herbert Losinga, Bishop of Norwich for accommodation of monks whilst the Cathedral and Priory were being constructed; >continued as a cell of Norwich Cathedral 1101; dissolved 1539	The Priory Church of Saint Leonard, Norwich	52°37′52″N 1°18′43″E
Norwich — St William's Cell		Benedictine monks cell dependent on Norwich; founded before(?)1150;	St Catherine St William	
Norwich Cathedral Priory ^{+}		Benedictine monks founded 1096-1101 by Bishop Herbert Losinga; dissolved 1539; in use as episcopal diocesan cathedral 1096-present	The Cathedral and Priory Church of the Holy and Undivided Trinity, Norwich	52°37′55″N 1°18′04″E
Norwich, Christ Church Priory		Benedictine monks foundation unknown (before 1076) by Ingulf; (Note: "Among the monks, which Ingulph found in his church of Crowaland A.D. 1076. there were fourteen from Christ Church in Norwich; of which Religious house nothing else hath yet occurr'd" — T. Tanner (1744 ed.) Notitia Monastica p.338) dissolved before 1076(?)		52°37′26″N 1°17′36″E
Old Buckenham Priory		Augustinian Canons Regular founded c.1146 by William de Albini (William d'Aubigny), Earl of Chichester; dissolved September 1536; granted to Sir Thomas Lovell	The Priory Church of Saint Mary, Saint James and All Saints, Buckenham ____________________; Oldbuckenham Priory; Buckenham Priory	
Pentney Priory		Augustinian Canons Regular founded c.1130 (or during the reign of William the Conqueror) by Robert de Vallileus; annexed by Wormegay 1468; dissolved 1537; granted to Thomas Mildmay 1538/9; remains incorporated into Abbey Farm and outbuildings which now occupy the site		52°40′45″N 0°30′57″E; 52°40′49″N 0°30′53″E
Peterstone Priory		Augustinian Canons Regular founded before 1200; flooded 1378 and 1387; dilapidated; annexed to Walsingham 1449, ceasing to function as a priory; granted 1550/1 to ?; remains incorporated into Peterstone farmhouse	St Peter's Priory and Hospital	52°57′07″N 0°46′11″E
Rudham Priory		Augustinian Canons Regular founded c.1140 by William Cheney; transferred to Coxford 1216	St Mary ____________________; East Rudham Priory	
Sheringham Cell		Augustinian Canons Regular — Arroasian cell dependent on Notley Abbey, Buckinghamshire; founded before 1164; dissolved before 1345(?)		
Shouldham Priory		Gilbertine Canons and nuns — double house founded after 1193 by Geoffrey Fitx Peters (Jeffery Fitz Piers) (later Earl of Essex); dissolved 15 October 1538; granted to Thomas Mildmay 1553; standing remains demolished c.1831; farmhouse and garden occupy the site	The Priory Church of the Holy Cross and the Blessed Virgin Mary, Shouldham	
Slevesholm Priory ^{#}		Cluniac monks alien house: dependent on Castle Acre; founded before 1290, either granted by William de Warenne in 1222-6 or established during the reign of Stephen; became denizen: independent from between 1351 and 1374; dissolved 1537	The Blessed Virgin Mary and St Giles; Slevesholm Priory	
Sporle Priory		Benedictine monks alien house: cell dependent on St Florent-de-Saumur; founded before 1123; church of St Mary and other endowments granted by Alan son of Flaald: papal confirmation 1123; vacant for a time after the Black Death; dissolved c.1414; granted to Eaton College 1440 (1558/9, according to Cobbett)		
Stove Cell		Cluniac monks alleged cell dependent on Castle Acre, no record of monks in residence		
Thetford Austin Friars ^{#}		Augustinian Friars (under the Limit of Cambridge) founded c.1387 by John of Gaunt, Duke of Lancaster, who made a benefaction: land granted by Sir Thomas Morley and Simon Barbour, apparently established 1389; dissolved September 1538; granted to Sir Richard Fulmerestoone 1540/1; nothing of the founded currently visible, remains of the foundations are believed to exist beneath the ground southeast of Thetford castle		
Thetford Blackfriars		episcopal diocesan cathedral for the diocese of East Anglia founded 1072; see transferred to Norwich 9 April 1094-1096; (converted for use as Cluniac Priory until 1114 (v. Thetford Priory, earlier site, infra), after which it lain waste for over 200 years); Dominican Friars (under the Visitation of Cambridge) founded 1335: church of St Mary the Great granted by Henry, Earl of Lancaster, confirmed by the King 20 July 1335; the Church of the Holy Trinity (founded 1072) made the friary church; dissolved 1538; remains of friary church, now incorporated into school buildings		
Thetford — Holy Sepulchre Priory		Augustinian Canons Regular — Holy Sepulchre founded after 1139 by William de Warenne, Earl of Surrey on land granted by King Stephen; Augustinian Canons Regular (independent) before c.1260; dissolved 1536	The Canon's Priory; The Canons	
Thetford Priory, earlier site		episcopal diocesan cathedral for East Anglia founded 1072; see transferred to Norwich 9 April 1094-1096; Cluniac monks alien house: dependent on Lewes, Sussex; founded 1103-4, built by Robert Bigot; transferred to new site (see immediately below) 1114; site granted to Dominican Friars 1335 (v. Thetford Blackfriars, supra)		
Thetford Priory		Cluniac monks alien house: dependent on Lewes, Sussex; (community founded at earlier site (see immediately above) 1103-4); transferred here 1114; became denizen: independent from 1376; dissolved 16 February 1540; granted to Thomas, Duke of Norfolk 1540/1; (EH)	St Mary	
Thetford — St George's Priory		Benedictine monks cell dependent on Bury St Edmunds; founded after 1020 (during the reign of Cnut) by Abbot Uvius; abandoned 1160; Benedictine nuns — from Ling refounded c.1160 by Abbot Hugh de Norwold; dissolved February 1537; granted to Richard Fulmerstone Esq. 1538/9	The Priory Church of Saint George, Thetford	
Toft Monks Priory ^{#}		Benedictine monks alien house: dependent on St-Pierre, Preaux; founded between 1087 and 1100 (during the reign of William II) Church of St Margaret and its endowments granted to the Abbey of St-Pierre, Preaux dissolved 1414; granted to Witham, Somerset; transferred to King's College, Cambridge 1462		
Walsingham Friary		Franciscan Friars (under the Custody of Cambridge) founded 1 February 1347 by Elizabeth de Burgh (Burgo), Countess of Clare: licence granted by Edward III; dissolved 1538; granted to John Eyer 1544/5	Walsginham Greyfriars	
Walsingham Priory		secular chapel founded before 1066; Augustinian Canons Regular founded 1153 by Geoffrey de Favarches (or the widow of Richoldis de Favarches) incorporating the Chapel of Our Lady of Walsingham (founded before 1066); dissolved 1538; granted to Thomas Sidney 1539/40; now in private ownership with public access	Little Walsingham Priory	
Welle Priory, in Gayton		Benedictine monks alien house: cell dependent on St-Etienne, Caen; founded c.1081 (during the reign of William the Conqueror) by William de Streis, who granted the manor of Well and the church of Gayton; united with Panfield c.1275; dissolved 1415; granted to St Stephen's, Westminster 1469; granted to the Bishops of Ely 1548/9; site currently occupied by house named 'Well Hall' built on site 18th century (c.1700)	Well Hall Priory; Welles Priory	
Wendling Abbey		Premonstratensian Canons daughter house of Langley; founded c.1267 by Rev. William of Wendling; due to be suppressed 1528 for Wolsey's Colleges, but delayed; dissolved 1536-7; granted to Edward Dyer and H. Cressener 1573/4	The Abbey Church of the Blessed Virgin Mary, Wendling	
St Winwaloe's Priory		Benedictine monks alien house: cell dependent on Montreuil; founded before 1199 by the Earl of Clare; dissolved c.1321: sold 1321; granted to West Dereham 1336; granted to Thomas Guibon and William Mynn; conventual remains appear to be incorporated into Winnold House built on site	St Winwaloe ____________________; Wirham Priory	
West Acre Priory		Black canons probably founded before 1100 (during the reign of William II) by Oliver, parish priest; brothers joined the Augustinian order c.1135 (possibly late in the reign of Henry I); Augustinian Canons Regular transferred c.1135; dissolved 15 January 1538; granted to Thomas Gresham 1553	The Priory Church of Saint Mary and All Saints, West Acre; Westacre Priory	
West Dereham Abbey		Premonstratensian Canons — from Welbeck, Nottinghamshire daughter house of Welbeck; founded 1188 by Hubert Walter, Dean of York (later Bishop of Salisbury); dissolved 1539; granted to Thomas Dereham 1539/40	The Abbey Church of the Blessed Virgin Mary	
Weybourne Priory		Augustine Canons Regular dependent on West Acre; founded 1199 by Sir Ralph Mainwaring (Meyngaryn); independent from 1314; dissolved 1536; granted to Richard Heydon 1545/6	The Priory Church of Saint Mary and All Saints, Weybourne ____________________; Waburn Priory	
Weybridge Priory		Augustinian Canons Regular priory cell; founded 1272 (before 1225) by Hugh Bigod, Earl of Norfolk; dissolved 1536; granted to Richard Fulmerstone 1538/9	St Mary	
Witchingham Priory		Cluniac monks alien house: cell or grange dependent on Longueville; founded c.1093 by Walter Giffard, 1st Earl of Buckingham who granted churches, manors and land to the priory of St Faith, Longueville, Rouen; dissolved 1414, reverting to the Crown; granted to New College, Oxford 1460		
Wormegay Priory ^{$}		Augustinian Canons Regular founded 1189-99 (during the reign of Richard I or of John) by William de Warenne; cell dependent on Pentney 1468; dissolved 1537; granted to the Bishop of Norwich 1550/1	The Priory Church of the Blessed Virgin Mary, the Holy Cross and Saint John the Evangelist, Wormegay	
Wretham Grange		Benedictine monks alien house: grange(?) dependent on Conches; founded c.1260(?): granted by Roger de Tony, son of Radulph — charter witnessed by Richard de Rom; a parcel of Wootton Wawen, with possibly a single monk, if any; dissolution unknown; church was rebuilt mid-14th and 15th century granted to Sir Roland Lenthall for life 1415; possessed by the Provost and Fellows of King's College, Cambridge 1443; church in parochial use after suppression; abandoned 1793; now in ruins	West Wretham Grange; Werteham Grange	
Wymondham Abbey ^{+}		Benedictine monks dependent on St Albans, Hertfordshire; priory founded 1107 (in the tenure of Abbot Richard de Albini) by William de Albini: charter witnessed by Roger Bigod; raised to abbey status 1449; dissolved 1538; granted to Sir William Hadden 1545/6; church, partly ruined, now in parochial use	The Abbey Church of Saint Mary the Virgin, Wymondham ____________________; Wymondham Priory	

[top]

=== Northamptonshire ===
(For references and location detail see List of monastic houses in Northamptonshire)

Foundation	Image	Communities & provenance	Formal name or dedication & alternative names
Brackley Blackfriars		hospital of Ss James and John; Dominican Friars (1420) intended conversion of hospital never implemented	
Brixworth Abbey ^{+}		Saxon monastery Benedictine? monks founded after 675; daughter church of Medehamstede (Peterborough), Mercia (Cambridgeshire); probably became a minster; destroyed? 870 in raids by the Danes; parochial c.960-70; now parochial: All Saints' Church, Brixworth	
Canons Ashby Priory ^{+}		Augustinian Canons Regular founded 1147-51 (during the reign of Stephen) by Stephen de Leye; dissolved 1536; became nunnery; granted to Sir Francis Bryan 1537/8; converted into secular residence; part of church now in parochial use	The Priory Church of the Blessed Virgin Mary, Ashby ____________________; Canon's Ashby Priory; Ashby Priory
Castor Priory		Saxon nuns founded before 664–5; destroyed by the Danes c.870 (or, less likely, 1010)	Dormundescastre Priory
Catesby Priory		evidently initially Benedictine nuns founded c.1175 by Robert de Esseby (Ashby); order by papal bull c.1189; Cistercian nuns founded c.1175; Augustinian Canons Regular founded after 1175 (associated with the Cistercian nunnery); (given as Gilbertine in the Mappa Mundi); with regular priests or brethren (from date unknown to after 1316) dissolved 1536; granted to John Onley 1536/7; house built on site 16th century; demolished 1863	St Mary and St Edmund or St Mary, St Edmund and St Thomas the Martyr (?) ____________________; Katebi Priory; Katesbey Priory
Chacombe Priory		Augustinian Canons Regular founded between 1216 and 1272 (during the reign of Henry II); dissolved 1536; granted to Michael Fox 1544/5; house named 'Chacombe Priory' built 17th century on the site	Chalcombe Priory
Daventry Priory		Cluniac monks (founded initially at Preston Capes c.1090); transferred here 1107–8; alien house: dependent on La Charite; allegedly seceded from Cluniac Order c.1231, although apparently reported directly to La Charite 1298, 1390 and 1405; became denizen: independent from 1405; dissolved 1525; granted to Christ Church, Oxford; Holy Cross church attached to the west range of the claustral buildings, demolished and replaced 19th century	St Augustine ____________________; Daventre Priory
Deene Priory		Benedictine monks priory cell, dependent on Westminster; founded before 1066; dissolved after 1086	
Delapré Abbey		Cluniac nuns founded c.1145, built by Simon de St Liz (Senlis) II, Earl of Northampton; dissolved 15 December 1538; granted to John Merabe 1542/3	St Mary ____________________; Northampton, Delapre Abbey; de Pratis
Dingley Preceptory		Knights Hospitallers founded before 1154; merged with Battisford 1461; dissolved 1540; granted to Edward Griffith 1544	
Everdon Priory ^{#}		Benedictine monks alien house: grange dependent on Bernay founded before c.1100; considered by some a parcel of Creeting St. Mary; dependent on Eton College before 1367; dissolved before c.1399; granted to Eton College 1440; remains recorded 1720; not locatable by 1970	
Fineshade Priory		Augustinian Canons Regular founded before 1208 by Richard Engayne (Engain), Lord of Blatherwike; dissolved 1536; granted to John, Lord Russell 1541/2; Sir Robert Kirkham converted west range into a country residence, which was demolished along with the remains of the priory 1749; house subsequently built on site; demolished 1956	St Mary ____________________; Castle Hymel Priory
Fotheringhay Nunnery		Cluniac nuns founded c1141(?) transferred to Delapré c.1145; secular college founded on site 1411, with associated church c.1460; dissolved 1548; granted to James Crew	Fodringhey College
Grafton Regis Priory		Augustininan Canons Regular cell or hermitage; founded 1180–1205; amalgamated with the Abbey of St James's, Northampton before 1400 (end of 14th century)	St Mary and St Michael ____________________; Grafton Regis Hermitage
Guilsborough Preceptory		Knights Hospitaller camera/hospital founded before 1285; dissolved before 1338	
Kalendar Priory		Premonstratensian canons priory?/cell, dependent on Sulby; founded after 1155: land granted by William Buttevant; probably ceased to exist before 1291(?)	St John ____________________; Kayland Priory; Kaylend Priory
Luffield Priory, Syresham	Partly in Buckinghamshire. See entry under Buckinghamshire		
Northampton Abbey		Augustinian Canons Regular founded c.1145-50 by William Peverel II of Nottingham; dissolved August 1538; granted to Nicholas Giffard 1545/6; housing estate now occupies site	The Abbey Church of Saint James, known as Northampton Abbey in St James End, Northampton
Northampton Austin Friars		Augustinian Friars (under the Limit of Oxford) founded 1275-90 (or possibly not before 1323 by Sir John Longville, of Wolverton); dissolved 1538; granted to Robert Dighton 1540/1	
Northampton Blackfriars ^{~}		Dominican Friars (under the Visitation of Oxford) founded before 1233; dissolved 1538; granted to William Ramesden 1544/5	
Northampton Friars of the Sack		Friars of the Sack founded before 1271; abandoned (before(?)) 1303	
Northampton Greyfriars, earlier site		Franciscan Friars (under the Custody of Oxford) founded 1226 by Sir Richard Gobion; transferred to new site (see immediately below) c.1235	
Northampton Greyfriars		Franciscan Friars (under the Custody of Oxford) transferred from earlier site (see immediately above) c.1235; built by 1258; dissolved 1538; granted to Richard Taverner 1544/5	
Northampton — St Andrew's Priory		Cluniac monks alien house: dependent on La Charité founded 1093–1100; became denizen: independent from 1405; dissolved 1538; site built over 19th century	St Andrew
Northampton Whitefriars		Camelite Friars founded before 1265 (1271) by Simon Montford and Thomas Chitwood; dissolved 1538; granted to William Ramesden 1544/6	
Northampton Nunnery		Franciscan nuns founded 1252; dissolved after 1272	
Oxney Priory	Historical county location. See entry under Cambridgeshire		
Peterborough Abbey	Historical county location. See entry under Cambridgeshire		
Pipewell Abbey		Cistercian monks daughter house of Newminster; founded 13 September 1143 (1141) by William de Boutwylein; dissolved 5 November 1538; granted to William, Marquess of Northampton 1547/8; ruinous by 1548; systematically demolished and used as building material; (not the modern 'Abbey church' to the north)	Pikewell Abbey
Preston Capes Priory		Cluniac monks alien house: dependent on La Charité; founded c.1090 by Hugh de Leicester; transferred to Daventry 1107–8	
Rothwell Priory		Augustinian canonesses founded before 1262, probably by a member of the Clare family, purportedly by Richard de Clare, Earl of Gloucester; dissolved 1537–8; former farmhouse known as 'The Nunnery' possibly built on site	The Priory Church of Saint John the Baptist, Rothwell
Sewardsley Priory		Cistercian nuns founded between 1216 and 1272 (during the reign of Henry II) by Richard de Lestre; dependent on the Cluniacs at Delapré 1459/60 for maintenance (though no evidence that the community converted to the Cluniac order); dissolved 1538; granted to Richard Fermer 1550/1	Sewardesley Priory
Stamford — St Michael's Priory	Historical county location. See entry under Cambridgeshire		
Stamford — St Sepulchre Priory	Historical county location. See entry under Cambridgeshire		
Sulby Abbey		Premonstratensian Canons daughter house of Newsham; mistakenly asserted to have transferred from Welford founded 1155 by William de Wideville; dissolved 1538; granted to Sir Christopher Hatton 1567/8	Sulbey Abbey; Welford Abbey
Weedon Monastery		Benedictine? nuns founded c.680 by St Werburgh, possibly on the site of an Anglo-Saxon royal palace; destroyed in raids by the Danes 870	
Weedon Beck Priory		Benedictine monks alien house: dependent on Bec-Hellouin and St Lambert de Mallassis; founded before 1086 (after 1126); dissolved after 1329(?); granted to Eton College 1462	Weedon Bec Priory
Weedon Pinkney Priory		Benedictine monks founded before 1126 (in the tenure of Robert, Bishop of Lincoln): endowments granted by Gilo de Pinkney and other members of his family; dependent on St Lucien, Beauvais; granted to Biddlesden 1392; manor granted to All Souls College, Oxford 1440	Weedon Lois Priory
Wermundsey Monastery ^{~}		unidentified, dependent on Peterborough, possibly located in Northamptonshire founded after 675 during the tenure of Abbot Cuthbald; destroyed in raids by the Danes 870	
Wittering Priory	Historical county location. See entry under Cambridgeshire		
Wothorpe Priory ^{#}		possibly intended Augustinian canonesses — Arroasian c.1160(?); Benedictine nuns founded 12th century (purportedly during the reign of Henry I); ruinous 1292; merged with Stamford 1354; granted to Richard Cecil 1540/1	St Mary ____________________; Wyrthorp Priory

Return to top of page

=== Northumberland ===
(For references and location detail see List of monastic houses in Northumberland)

Foundation	Image	Communities & provenance	Formal name or dedication & alternative names
Alnwick Abbey		Premonstratensian Canons — from Newhouse Abbey daughter house of Newsham; founded 1147 by Eustace FitzJohn; dissolved 1536-22 December 1539; granted to Ralph Sadler and Laurence Winnington 1550/1	The Abbey Church of the Blessed Virgin Mary, Alnwick
Bamburgh Friary		Dominican Friars (under the Visitation of York) founded before 1265; dissolved 1539	
Bamburgh Monastery		Saxon monastery founded 8th century; abandoned c.875: destroyed in raids by the Danes; site now occupied by St Aidan's parish church	
Bamburgh Priory		Augustinian Canons Regular cell dependent on Nostell, Yorkshire; founded 1121: granted to Nostell by Henry I, confirmed 1121; effective c.1228; dissolved c.1537	St Aidan ____________________; Hamburgh Priory
Berwick Austin Friars		Augustinian Friars founded before 1299 possibly one of the houses in Berwick which survived suppression until after 10 March 1539/40	
Berwick Blackfriars, earlier site		Dominican Friars founded before 1240/1 by Alexander II; mandate by the Pope to the Bishop of St Andrews 17 June 1285, for the sale of the former house of the Friars of the Sack to the Dominicans, (see immediately below)	St Peter Martyr, of Milan
Berwick Blackfriars		Friars of the Sack founded 1267; dissolved between 1274 and 1285; Dominican Friars (community founded at earlier site (see immediately above) before 1240/1); transferred here 1285; dissolved or secularised 1539(?)	St Peter Martyr, of Milan
Berwick Greyfriars		Franciscan Friars Minor, Conventual founded 1231; dissolved or secularised between 10 March 1538/9 and Michaelmas 1539	
Berwick Priory		Cistercian nuns founded before 1153; sometimes confused with Holystone; dissolved or secularised 1390/1	The Blessed Virgin Mary and St Leonard of South Berwick ____________________; Nunnery of South Berwick
Berwick Red Friars		Trinitarians founded before 1240-80, possibly at the hospital of St Edward or Bridge House; given as non-conventual 1447; given as ruinous 1456, revenues united with Peebles and declared uninhabitable by 2 March 1476, union confirmed by James III	
Berwick Whitefriars		Carmelite Friars purportedly founded 1270 by Sir John Gray (details possibly confused with Berwick Greyfriars); dissolved between 10 March and Michaelmas 1539	
Blanchland Abbey^{+}		Premonstratensian Canons daughter house of Croxton, Leicestershire; founded 1165 by Walter de Bolbec II; dissolved 18 December 1539; granted to John Bellow and John Broxholm 1545/6; part of church now in parochial use, other monastic buildings in current use in ownership of the Lord Crewe Trust	The Blessed Virgin Mary ____________________; Blanca Landa
Brinkburn Priory		Augustinian Canons Regular — from Pentney, Norfolk dependent on Pentney founded before/c.1135 (during the reign of Henry I) by William Bertram I, of Mitford (or Osebertus Colunarius); independent from before 1188(?); dissolved 1536; granted to John, Earl of Warwick 1550/1; (EH)	The Priory Church of Saint Peter and Saint Paul, Brinkburn ____________________; Berkenburne Priory
Bywell Monastery		records suggest existence of a Saxon monastery	Biguell Monastery
Carham Priory		Augustinian Canons Regular cell dependent on Kirkham, Yorkshire; founded 1131 church of St Cuthbert and lands granted to Kirkham by Walter Espec; dissolved 1539	
Chibburn Preceptory		Knights Hospitaller founded before 1313; became a member of Mount St John 1358	
Coquet Island Priory		Benedictine monks founded before 684; abandoned c.800: destroyed in raids by the Danes; cell dependent on Tynemouth refounded before 1125: granted to Tynemouth by Robert Mowbray	
Corbridge Monastery		Saxon monks — probably from Hexham; founded before 786 possibly founded before 709 by St Wilfrid; abandoned before 877?: ?destroyed in raids by the Danes	St Andrew
Farne Island Cell		Anchorites hermitage cell before 651; abandoned c.800: destroyed in raids by the Danes; last anchorite died 1246, subsequently became Benedictine cell (see immediately below)	
Farne Island Priory		Benedictine monks cell dependent on Durham; founded c.1193 on location of extinct anchorite cell (see immediately above); rebuilt 14th century; dissolved c.1538 restored 1840-50	St Cuthbert
Guyzance Priory		Premonstratensian Canonesses founded c.1147-52 by Richard Tison; granted to Alnwick, confirmed by William, Bishop of Durham; ceased 1349-50(?) when the community probably perished in the Black Death; Premonstratensian Canons — from Alnwick cell dependent on Alnwick; refounded after 1350; dissolved	The Prioy Church of Saint Wilfrid ____________________; Brainshaugh Priory
Hexham Priory ^{+}		Saxon monastery and cathedral founded 674 by St Wilfred and St Etheldreda, begun by St Wilfrid; diocese merged with Lindisfarne 821, cathedral status revoked; abandoned 875: destroyed in raids by the Danes; Augustinian Canons Regular founded 1113; dissolved 28 September 1536 – 26 February 1537; granted to Sir Reginald Carnaby 1538/9; now called 'Hexham Abbey'; church in parochial use	The Priory Church of Saint Andrew, Hexham Priory and Parish Church of Saint Andrew, Hexham ____________________; Hexham Abbey
Holystone Priory		Benedictine nuns founded before 1124 by Robert de Umfravillle I; Augustinian canonesses transferred 13th century; with regular priests or brethren after 1291 dissolved 1539	St Mary ____________________; Haylston Priory
Hulne Friary		Carmelite Friars founded 1242 (c.1240) by John de Vesci; dissolved 1539; granted to Thomas Reve and William Ryvet 1563/4; church demolished/ruined; part converted into a house and summerhouse 18th century; now called 'Hulne Priory'	Holm Friary; Hulne Whitefriars
Lambley Priory		Benedictine nuns founded before 1190 probably by Adam de Tindale and his wife Helwise (who granted land) (or by King John); referred to as an abbey in King John's charter (granted mistakenly); also suggested as Augustinian; burned by the Scots 1297; dissolved 1537; granted to John, Duke of Northumberland 1553	St Mary and St Patrick ____________________; Lambley upon the Tyne Priory
Lindisfarne Priory, Holy Island		Celtic monks monastic cathedral founded 635 (634) by St Aidan: granted to Aidan by King Oswald; Saxon (Benedictine?) monks refounded c.668; destroyed in raids by the Danes 793; abandoned 875: destroyed in raids by the Danes; Benedictine monks — from Durham cell dependent on Durham; founded 1083 (1082 or 1073); dissolved 1537; granted to the Dean and Chapter of Durham 1541/2; (EH)	St Cuthbert
Merchingley Priory		Tironensian monks cell (possible grange), dependent on Kelso; founded c.1168: hermitage and chapel granted to Kelso by Walter de Bolbec; sequestered by Edward I 1296	St Mary ____________________; Marchingley Priory; Mercheley Priory
Newminster Abbey		Cistercian monks — from Fountains Abbey daughter house of Fountains founded 5 January 1138 by Ranulph de Merlay; dissolved 20 August 1537; granted to Robert Brandling 1609/10; Abbey Farmhouse built on site, public access with permission	Novum Monasterium
Ovingham Priory		Augustinian Canons Regular cell dependent on Hexham; founded 1378 by Mr Ufranvile: church of St Mary granted to Hexham; dissolved 1537	
Temple Thornton Camera		Knights Templar camera (sometimes considered a preceptory) founded before 1205 (during the tenure of Walter de Bolbeck), granted by William de Lisle; dissolved 1308-12; passed to Knights Hospitaller after 1308; dissolved after 1338	
Warkworth Priory		Benedictine monks cell dependent on Durham; founded before 1241-9 (or between 1332 and 1353 by Henry, second Lord Percy of Alnwick, who was granted Warkworth Castle in 1332; or founded, possibly as a chantry, c.1400 by the first Earl of Northumbria); dissolved 15th century(?); ruinous and disused before 1567 (EH)	chapel of St Mary Magdalene ____________________; Warkworth Hermitage; Warkworth Castle Hermitage
Warmington Cell(?) ^{~}		Benedictine monks cell dependent on St Mary, York; cited, but no cell of this name has been identified in Northumberland	
Yeavering Monastery (?)		extensive buildings revealed by crop markings suggest monastic settlement	

Return to top of page

=== Nottinghamshire ===
(For references and location detail see List of monastic houses in Nottinghamshire)

Foundation	Image	Communities & provenance	Formal name or dedication & alternative names
Beauvale Charterhouse		Carthusian monks founded 1343 by Nicholas de Cauntlow (Cantilupo), Lord of Ilkeston: licence granted 1343; dissolved 18 July 1539; granted to Richard Morison 1550/1	The Priory Church of the Holy Trinity, Beauvale The Priory Church of the Holy Trinity and Saint Mary the Virgin with All Saints ____________________; Beauvale Priory
Blyth Priory ^{+}		Benedictine monks alien house: dependent on St Holy Trinity, Rouen; founded 1088 by Roger de Builly; became denizen: independent from c.1409; dissolved 1536; granted to Richard Andrews and William Ramesden 1543/4; church now in parochial use	The Priory Church of Saint Mary the Virgin, Blyth
Broadholme Priory^{$}	Historical county location. See entry under Lincolnshire		
Felley Priory		Augustinian Canons Regular dependent on Worksop; founded 1152: church and hermitage granted to Worksop by Ralph Britto of Annesley; independent from 1260; dissolved 1536	St Mary
Fiskerton Cell		Augustinian Canons Regular possible cell dependent on Thurgarton (more likely a chapel served by Canons from Thurgarton); founded c.1139 by Ralph de Ayncourt; granted to Edward Fynes, Lord Clinton and Thomas Morrison	Fiskarton Cell
Lenton Priory		Cluniac monks alien house: dependent on Cluny; founded 1102-8 by William Peverell; became denizen: independent from 1392; dissolved 1538; granted to John Harrington 1562/3	The Priory Church of the Holy Trinity ____________________; St Anthony's Hospital
Marske Cell (?)		Benedictine monks cell? dependent on York; existence disputed	Marshe Cell
Mattersey Priory		Gilbertine Canons founded c.1185 by Roger FitzRalph, son of Ranulf de Mattersey; destroyed by fire 1279; dissolved 3 October 1538; granted to Antony Neville, Esq. 1539/40; (EH)	The Priory Church of Saint Helen, Mattersey
Newark Greyfriars ^{#}		Observant Franciscan Friars founded 1507 (or c.1499 by Henry VII); dissolved 1534; Augustinian Friars refounded; dissolved 1539; granted to John Andrews; house built on site named 'The Friary'	Newark Greyfriars; Newark Austin Friars
Newstead Priory		Augustinian Canons Regular founded c.1163 by Henry II; dissolved 21 July 1539; granted to Sir John Byron 1541/2; converted into a mansion named 'Newstead Abbey'; restored by George Gordon Byron, poet, c.1800; restored by John Shaw for Col. Wildman 1819; further altered c.1862 for William Frederick Webb, African explorer, upon whose death, 1899, estate passed via his surviving children to his grandson Charles Ian Fraser who sold Newstead to philanthropist Sir Julien Cahn, who presented it to Nottingham Corporation 1931; now in ownership of Nottingham City Council	St Mary
Nottingham Basford Cell		Cluniac monks cell dependent on Lenton?; founded before c.1200; dissolved after 1300	
Nottingham Friary *		Franciscan Friars Minor extant	Friary and Parish of Our Lady and St Edward
Nottingham Greyfriars		Franciscan Friars Minor, Conventual (under the Custody of Oxford) founded before 1230; dissolved 1539	
Nottingham — Holy Sepulchre Priory		Augustinian Canons Regular — Holy Sepulchre founded c.1170; dissolved after 1188	
Nottingham Roche Cell		Cluniac monks cell dependent on Lenton; foundation unknown; dissolved after 1405	
Nottingham Whitefriars		Carmelite Friars founded before 1271, site granted by Reginald de Grey; dissolved 5 February 1539; granted to Thomas Henneage 1548/9	
Ossington Preceptory		Knights Hospitaller founded before 1154, granted by William, Archbishop of York; merged with Newland, Yorkshire 1382; church of the Holy Rood built 1782, probably stands on or near site	
Rufford Abbey		Cistercian monks founded 13 July 1136 by Gilbert de Gant, Earl of Lincoln; dissolved 1536; granted to George, Earl of Shrewsbury; now in ownership of Nottinghamshire County Council	
Shelford Priory		Augustinian Canons Regular founded (in the reign of Henry II) by Ralph Hanselyn; dissolved 1536; granted to Michael Stanhope 1539/40; remains incorporated into house named 'Shelford House' built c.1600, destroyed by fire 1645, rebuilt c.1678	
Thurgarton Priory ^{+}		Augustinian Canons Regular founded c.1119-39 by Ralph Deincourt, with the influence of Archbishop Thurstan; dissolved 12 June 1538; fortified for Charles I 1643; in use as Bishop's Palace 1884–1904; part of church now in parochial use	The Priory Church of Saint Peter, Thurgarton
Wallingwells Priory ^		Benedictine nuns founded 1130 (probably c.1140-4) by Ralph de Chevrolcourt (Cheurolcourt); also given as Augustinian dissolved 14 December 1539; granted to Richard Pype and Francis Boyer 1563/4; granted to Richard Whalley 1548/9; remains possibly partly incorporated into country house named Wallingwells Hall, built 18th/19th century	St Mary de Parco
Welbeck Abbey		Premonstratensian Canons — from Newsham, Lincolnshire founded 1153 by Thomas of Cuckney (Thomas Jocei); canons in residence by October 1134; dissolved 20 June 1538; remains incorporated into private residence, under the ownership of Sir Charles Cavendish before 1607; since altered and remodelled	The Abbey Church of Saint James, Welbeck
Winkburn Preceptory		Knights Hospitaller founded 1189–99, church granted by Henry Hosat and vill by Adam Tysun; serving as a camera of Ossington; dissolved 1382	
Worksop Priory ^{+}		Augustinian Canons Regular — probably from Huntingdon Priory founded after 1119 by William de Lovetot; dissolved 15 November 1538; granted to Francis, Earl of Shrewsbury 1541/2 church now in parochial use	The Priory Church of Saint Mary and Saint Cuthbert, Worksop ____________________; Wirksop Priory; formerly known as Radford Priory

Return to top of page

=== Oxfordshire ===
(For references and location detail see List of monastic houses in Oxfordshire)

Foundation	Image	Communities & provenance	Formal name or dedication & alternative names
Abingdon Abbey ^		Saxon (Benedictine?) monks probably minster and abbey; (community supposedly founded by Hean, at Bagley Wood, near Sunningwell 675); transferred here 695; destroyed c.872 in raids by the Danes; Benedictine monks founded c.954 (950); dissolved 9 February 1538; remains incorporated into town buildings; in local authority and trust ownership with public access to church	The Abbey Church of the Blessed Virgin Mary, Abingdon
Barton Cell		Augustinian Canons Regular ?cell, dependent on Oseney; possibly an estate without resident canons	
Bicester Priory		Augustinian Canons Regular founded 1182-5, endowed by Gilbert Basset, Baron of Hedington; dissolved 1536; granted to Charles, Duke of Suffolk 1538/9	St Edburga ____________________; Burchester Priory
Bruern Abbey ^{#}		Cistercian monks — from Waverley, Surrey; founded 1147; dissolved 1536; granted to Sir Antony Coke 1610/1; site now occupied by 18th century private house named 'Bruern Abbey'	The Abbey Church of Saint Mary of the Heath of Tretone, Bruern ____________________; Brueria Abbey; Bruerne Abbey
Burford Priory ^		Hospital of St John the Evangelist founded 13th century dissolved 1538; restored 1637; Anglican Benedictine founded 1901; sold off 2008; now in use as a country house, incorporating remains of the medieval hospital	Priory of Our Lady, Burford ____________________; The Priory
Caversham Cell		Augustinian Canons Regular status unknown, dependent on Notley, Buckinghamshire; founded 1162; dissolved c.1538	
Charlton on Otmoor Priory		Benedictine monks alien house: grange dependent on St Evroul; founded 1086 (1081) by Hugh Grentemoisnil; dissolved 1414; granted to Sir Thomas White and others	Charleton Priory
Charney Manor ^{~}		Benedictine Monks residential manor, chapel and farm; granted to Abingdon before 1066; range c.1280; leased as a manor house from 1494; remodelled/rebuilt 16th, 17th and 19th century; converted and in use as a hotel 20th century	
Cholsey Abbey		Benedictine monks founded 986 by King Ethelred II probably destroyed in raids by the Danes 1006; dissolved; granted to Sir Francis Englefield; probable slight remains incorporated into medieval parish church	Cholsey Grange
Clanfield Preceptory		Knights Hospitaller founded before 1279; united to Quenington before 1433	
Clanfield Cell		Sisters of the Order of St John of Jerusalem cell foundation unknown dissolved c.1180: transferred to Buckland, Somerset	
Clattercote Priory		Gilbertine canons hospital founded 1148-66, possibly by Robert de Chesney; hospital ceased before 1262; priory, refounded 1251-62; dissolved 1538(?); granted to Thomas Lee c.1559; site now occupied by a private house	St Leonard
Cogges Priory		Benedictine monks alien house: dependent on Fécamp; founded 1103 by Manasses Arsic; dissolved 1414; granted to Eton College	St Mary
Cold Norton Priory		Augustinian Canons Regular hospital of St George and church of St John the Evangelist founded 1148-58 by Avelina de Norton; dissolved 1507: no canons remaining; granted to St Stephen's, Westminster	The Priory Church of Saint John the Evangelist, Cold Norton
Coxwell Grange ^{#}		Cistercian Monks probably grange with chapel; founded 1205 (1204); dependent on Beaulieu, Hampshire; Court House Farm built on site 16th century; (NT)	
Dorchester Abbey ^{+}		secular cathedral founded 634, new see of the West Saxons created; see transferred to Winchester 663 see of Mercia 670s; see restored after 869 (875); see transferred to Lincoln 1072; secular canons collegiate founded 1072: built on site of episcopal diocesan cathedral; dissolved c.1140 by Alexander, Bishop of Lincoln; Augustinian Canons Regular — Arroasian (?) founded c.1140 by Alexander, Bishop of Lincoln; dissolved 1536; granted to Edmond Ashfield 1544/5; restored by James Cranston c.1845, William Butterfield 1846-53, and George Gilbert Scott 1859-74; church continues in parochial use as the Parish Church of SS Peter and Paul	The Abbey Church of Saint Peter, Saint Paul and Saint Birinus
East Hendred Cell		Carthusian monks grange: manor and chapel dependent on Sheen, Surrey, (Greater London), but apparently grange status, possibly without resident monks	
Eynsham Abbey		Benedictine monks founded 1005 by Æthelmar (Ailmer), Earl of Cornwall, on the site of 9th century church; destroyed and monks dispersed at the Norman Conquest, after 1066; restored before 1086 by Remigius, Bishop of Lincoln transferred to Stow, Lincolnshire 1091; returned c.1094-5; dissolved December 1539; granted to Sir Edward North and William Darcey 1543/4	St Mary (also St Andrew and St Eadburgh given) ____________________; Egnesham Abbey
Faringdon Abbey		Cistercian monks — from Cîteaux founded before 2 November 1203: manor granted to Citeaux by King John; transferred to Beaulieu, Hampshire 1204; monastic cell or grange early 13th century; probably merged with Coxford Grange; privately leased 1351; granted to Sir Francis Englefield	Saint Mary; Farendon Priory; Faringdon Minster
Godstow Abbey		Benedictine nuns with small community of Benedictine monks under a master attached to the nunnery founded by Easter 1133 by Ediva (Editha), widow of Sir William Launcelene, assisted by Henry I, built on land granted by John de St John; dissolved 17 November 1539; granted by Henry VIII to his physician, Dr George Owen before 1547	St Mary and St John the Baptist ____________________; Godeston Abbey
Goring Priory		Augustinian Canonesses founded 12th century (during the reign of Henry I) by Thomas de Druval who granted a church and land; dissolved 1539(?); granted to Charles, Duke of Suffolk c.1531; later granted to Sir Thomas Pope; part of conventual church in parochial use	The Priory Church of the Blessed Virgin Mary, Goring
Gosford Preceptory		Knights Hospitaller foundation unknown, land granted by Robert d'Oilly; dissolved c.1180(?); hospitallers' oratory/chapel built c.1234; united to Quenington before 1433; granted to Antony Stringer and John Williams 1542/3	
Gosford Cell		Sisters of the Order of St John of Jerusalem cell; foundation unknown dissolved c.1180: transferred to Buckland	
Helenstowe Nunnery, Abingdon		nuns founded c.675; site now occupied by St Helen's Church	The Church of the Holy Cross and Saint Helen, Helenstowe
Littlemore Priory		Benedictine nuns founded before 1154 by Robert de Sandford; dissolved 1525, suppressed for Wolsey's college; granted to William Owen and John Bridges c.1539	St Mary, St Nicholas and St Edmund
Merton Preceptory		Knights Templar founded c.1156, granted by Simon, Earl of Northampton; dissolved c.1240(?), became a limb of Sandford	
Milton Cell		Benedictine monks purported cell dependent on Abingdon — evidence lacking	
Minchery Priory		Benedictine nuns site now occupied by Minchery Farm, also called 'The Priory and...?....'	
Minster Lovell Priory		Saxon minster Benedictine monks alien house: cell dependent on Ivry; founded c.1200-6, St Kenelm's Church granted to Ivry 1200; dissolved 1414 (1415); granted to Eton College 1441	
Oddington Grange		Cistercian monks dependent on Thame; founded c.1141; possibly on the site of Otley Abbey	
Oseney Abbey		Augustinian Canons Regular priory founded 1129 by Robert d'Oilly (son of the Lord of Oxford) and his wife Edith; raised to abbey status c.1154; mitred abbey 1481; dissolved 17 November 1539; episcopal diocesan cathedral founded 1542: new see created; see transferred to Christ Church, Oxford 1546; fell into decay and demolished	St Mary ____________________; Oseney Priory; Aseney Priory; Osney Abbey
Otley Abbey		Cistercian monks dependent on Waverley, Surrey; founded 22 July 1137: land granted by Robert Gait; abandoned, transferred to Thame c.1141; Oddington Grange probably established on site (though possibly deserted village rather than monastic)	Ottley Abbey; Ottelei Abbey; Oddington Grange?
Oxford Austin Friars ^{#}		Austin Friars (under the Limit of Oxford) founded 1266-7; Henry III regarded as founder 1268; impoverished and ruinous at dissolved July 1538; Oxford Wadham College founded 1612 by Nicholas Wadham	
Oxford Blackfriars — St Aldate's		Dominican Friars (under the Visitation of Oxford) founded 1221; transferred to new site (see immediately below) 1245	oratory: St Mary
Oxford Blackfriars — St Ebbe's		Dominican Friars (under the Visitation of Oxford) (community founded at St Aldates (see immediately above) 1221); transferred here 1245; dissolved 1538	
Oxford Cathedral Priory ^{+}		Augustinian Canonesses founded c.727 by Didanus, petty king; destroyed in raids by the Danes c.874?; destroyed in raids by the Danes 1002; rebuilt; secular canons founded 1004; Augustinian Canons Regular — from Holy Trinity, Aldgate, Middlesex (Greater London) refounded 1122; dissolved April 1524, suppressed for Cardinal Wolsey's college; episcopal diocesan cathedral and college chapel founded 1546: see transferred from Oxney; extant	St Frideswide's Priory, Oxford
Oxford — Canterbury College		Benedictine monks dependent on Canterbury; founded 1331 (1349) by Simon de Islip, Archbishop of Canterbury; lapsed; refounded 1363-70 by Archbishop Islip; secular 1365; constituted as a monastic college c.1368-70; dissolved c.1539; made part of Christ Church, Oxford 1546/7; rebuilt 1773	
Oxford Crutched Friars		Crutched Friars founded 1342: licence granted to Crutched Friars of London 29 July 1342 to acquire land in Oxford; dwelling-place apparently moved a number of times; Bishop forbade completion of church began 1349; dissolved before 1362; property disposed of 1362	
Oxford — Durham College		Benedictine monks priory cell dependent on Durham, County Durham; founded 1286-91, land purchased by Durham 1286, completed 1291; dissolved 1540; Trinity College founded on site 1554-5 by Sir Thomas Pope and his wife Elizabeth	
Oxford Friars of the Sack		Friars of the Sack founded 1261-2; ruinous parish church of St Budoc acquired by the friars, becoming the conventual church; dissolved, granted to Franciscan Friars c.1309	
Oxford — Gloucester College		Benedictine monks priory cell dependent on Gloucester, Gloucestershire; founded 1283, house granted by John Giffard; college founded 1291; dissolved 1538; Worcester College founded 1714 under the will of Sir Thomas Cookes	Glocester College; Glocester Hall
Oxford Greyfriars, earlier site		Franciscan Friars Minor, Conventual (under the Custody of Oxford) friars from Canterbury moved to Oxford via London, residing with the Dominicans for eight days in autumn 1224, then hired a house at St Ebbe's before transferred to new site (see immediately below) 1244-5	
Oxford Greyfriars		Franciscan Friars Minor, Conventual (under the Custody of Oxford) (community founded at St Ebbe's 1224) transferred here from earlier site (see immediately above) 1244-5: house and land granted to the townsmen for the friars' use by Richard the Miller; dissolved1538	
Oxford — London College		purportedly Benedictine monks and secular college (in fact secular only) founded after 1421	
Oxford — St Albans Hall		Benedictine monks founded c.1140; part of Oxford — Gloucester College; now part of Merton College	
Oxford, St Bernard's College		Cistercian monks abbey, founded 1437 (1436) by Henry Chichele, Archbishop of Canterbury, who granted land; dissolved 1540; refounded as St John's College during the reign of Mary	St Mary and St Bernard
Oxford, St Mary's College		Augustinian Canons Regular priory, founded 1435 by Thomas Holden and his wife Elizabeth; dissolved 1540	
Oxford Trinitarian Priory, earlier site		Trinitarians founded before 1286: granted by Edmund, Earl of Cornwall 1293; transferred to new site (see immediately below) c.1313	The Holy Trinity
Oxford Trinitarian Priory		Trinitarians community founded at earlier site (see immediately above) before 1286; transferred here c.1313 (site acquired before 1307); known as 'Trinity Hall' from late-15th century, apparently dependent on Moatenden; dissolved 1538	The Holy Trinity
Oxford Whitefriars, earlier site		Carmelite Friars founded 1256: site granted by Nicholas de Meules (de Molis); transferred to new site (see immediately below) 1317-18; incorporated into the Benedictines' college, Oxford — Gloucester College, until the Dissolution 1538	
Oxford Whitefriars		Camelite Friars (community founded at earlier site (see immediately above) 1256); transferred here 1317-18 by Edward II to his manor, 'the Palace of Beaumont', together with the friars at Sheen, Surrey (Greater London); dissolved 1538; demolished 16th century	The King's Hall; the Palace of Beaumont
Pheleley Priory		Benedictine monks founded after 1100 (during the reign of Henry I); apparently connected with Tewkesbury, but assigned by Tewkesbury as a cell to Eynsham; annexed to /transferred to Eynsham after c.1145	Phelely Priory
Rewley Abbey		intended as a secular establishment by King Richard; Cistercian monks dependent on Thame; founded 11 December 1143 by Edmund, Earl of Cornwall; dissolved c.1536; granted to the Dean and Chapter of Christ Church, Oxford 1546/7	
Sandford Preceptory		Knights Templar founded c.1240: lands granted to Temple Cowley by Thomas the younger, of Sandford; transferred from Temple Cowley; dissolved 1308-12; Knights Hospitaller transferred after 1312; dissolved 1371: incorporated into the camerae of the prior of England; becoming a farmhouse; granted to Edward Powell 1541/2 remnants now in use as part of a Four Pillars Hotel	Sandford-on-Thames Preceptory; Saunford Hospital
Sibford Camera		Knights Templar founded before(?)1185; dissolved 1312	
Steventon Priory		Benedictine monks alien house: dependent on St-Mary-du-Pré, Rouen and Bec-Hellouin, Normandy founded 12th century (during the reign of Henry I) manor granted to St Mary de Pre (St Mary de Prato, called Bonne-Nouvelle), Rouen, a dependent of Bec-Hellouin; farmed out 1378; dissolved 1389; granted to Westminster Abbey by Richard II; officially a priory but actually a grange no monastic church prior's house now in private ownership with public access by appointment (NT)	Stenington Priory
Studley Priory		Benedictine nuns founded 12th century by Bernard of Walery (de St Walerico); dissolved 1536 (apparently suppressed), 19 November 1539 (surrendered); granted to John Croke 1539/40; converted into an Elizabethan manor house; now in use as the Studley Priory Hotel	St Mary ____________________; Stodeley Priory
Temple Cowley Preceptory		Knights Templar founded 1136 by Queen Matilda; transferred to Temple Cowley c.1240 and thereafter reduced to status of camera	
Thame Abbey		Cistercian monks transferred from Otley; dependent on Waverley, Surrey; (founded at Otley 22 July 1137); transferred here c.1140: site granted by Alexander, Bishop of Lincoln; dissolved 1539; granted to Edward, Duke of Somerset c.1547; remains incorporated into 18th century country house	Tame Abbey
Wallingford Priory ^{#}		Benedictine monks cell of St Albans, Hertfordshire founded 1097 or 1088 (1077-93, 1087-9) by Robert D'Oyley or Gilfrid, Abbot of St Alban; dissolved 1525(-8) by Cardinal Wolsey to fund Ipswich College; granted to John Norres c.1546;	The Priory Church of the Holy Trinity, Wallingford ____________________; Wallingford Cell; Waring Cell
Wroxton Abbey		Augustinian Canons Regular founded c.1217 by Magister Michael Belet dissolved c.1537 (1536); granted to Sir Thomas Pope who gave part to Trinity College, Oxford; scant remains incorporated into mansion called 'Wroxton Abbey' built on site 1618	The Priory Church of St Mary, Wroxton ____________________; Wroxton Priory
Westcot Camera		Knights Templar founded 13th century (during the reign of Henry III): holdings granted by Robert Achard; dissolved 1308-12; Knights Hospitaller transferred 1308-12	Westcott Camera
Wytham Abbey ^{#}		nuns — from Helenstow; purportedly transferred here after 700; dispersed to other houses during hostilities c.780;	

Return to top of page

=== Rutland ===
(For references and location detail see List of monastic houses in Rutland)

Foundation	Image	Communities and provenance	Formal name or dedication and alternative names
Brooke Priory ^{#}		Augustinian Canons Regular priory cell dependent on St Mary's Abbey, Kenilworth, Warwickshire founded before c.1153 by Hugh de Ferrero; dissolved 1535–6; granted to Antony Coope 1536/7	St Mary
Edith Weston Priory ^{~}		Benedictine monks alien house: cell, dependent on St-Georges, Bocherville founded c.1114 by William de Tancarville, sold to the Carthusians at Coventry 1394; granted to William, Marquis of Northampton 1550/1	

Return to top of page

=== Shropshire ===
(For references and location detail see List of monastic houses in Shropshire)

Foundation	Image	Communities & provenance	Formal name or dedication & alternative names
Alberbury Priory		Augustinian Canons Regular — Arroasian dependent on Lilleshall; founded c.1221-6; Grandmontine monks alien house: dependent on Grandmont; refounded c.1230: confirmed by Fulk fitz Warin of Whittington, 1232; dissolved c.1441; bought by Henry Chichele, Archbishop of Canterbury; granted to All Souls College, Oxford by Henry VI, in use as a chantry chapel; dissolved 1547; conventual church converted into a farmhouse called 'White Abbey Farm' 1578; alterations 1857–8	St Mary ____________________; White Abbey
Beth centuryote		Augustinian Canons Regular dependent on Haughmond; farm and chapel	
Bridgnorth Greyfriars		Franciscan Friars Minor, Conventual (under the Custody of Worcester) founded 1244; dissolved 1538	
Bromfield Priory ^{+}		secular canons collegiate founded before 1061; Benedictine monks cell dependent on Gloucester, Gloucestershire; founded 1155; dissolved 1540; granted to Charles Fox; church now in parochial use	St Mary, Virgin
Buildwas Abbey		Savignac monks — from Savigny dependent on Savigny; founded 8 August 1135; Cistercian monks orders merged 1147; dissolved 1535 (1536) part of monastic buildings incorporated into a private house; (EH)	The Abbey Church of St Mary and St Chad, Buildwas ____________________; Bildewas Abbey
Chirbury Priory		Augustinian Canons Regular — from Snead founded c.1190 by Robert de Buthlers, Lord of Montgomery; canons arrived c.1195; dissolved 1536; granted Edward Hampton 1545/6	The Priory Church of Saint Michael, Chirbury
Church Preen Priory		Cluniac monks alien house: dependent on Wenlock; founded after 1150; cell 1384; dissolved before 1539	St John the Baptist ____________________; Preen Priory
Donnington Wood Abbey		Augustinian Canons Regular — Arroasian — from Dorchester, Oxfordshire; (community founded at Lizard c.1143); transferred from Lizard c.1144; dissolved c.1148; transferred to new site at Lilleshall	
Emstrey		possible Saxon minster	Eiminstre
Halston Preceptory		possible Knights Templar (evidence lacking); Knights Hospitaller refounded before 1221 (between 1165 and 1187) by Roger de Powys, Lord of Whittington; dissolved before 1540; granted to William Horne 1562/3	
Hatton Grange		Cistercian monks grange, dependent on Buildwas; founded 1227; dissolved before 1540	
Haughmond Abbey		Augustinian Canons Regular priory? founded c.1110 (1130-8) by William fitz Alan of Clun; Augustinian Canons Regular — Arroasian(?) priory; before 1130–5; purportedly raised to abbey status c.1155?; listed under Augustinian general chapter c.1160-80; dissolved 9 September 1539; granted to Edward Littleton (died 1558) 1540/1; (EH)	The Abbey Church of St John the Evangelist, Haughmond ____________________; Haghmon Priory
Lilleshall Abbey		Augustinian Canons Regular — Arroasian — from Dorchester, Oxfordshire, via Lizard (community founded at Lizard c.1143); transferred from Donnington Wood c.1148; dissolved 1538; granted to James Leveson 1539/40; (EH)	The Blessed Virgin Mary ____________________; Lilleshull Priory
Lizard Abbey		Augustinian Canons Regular — from Dorchester, Oxfordshire founded c.1143; transferred to new site at Donnington Wood c.1144; retained for use as grange	
Ludlow Austin Friars		Augustinian Friars (under the Limit of Lincoln) founded 1254; built c.1282; dissolved 1538; granted to George Cotton and William Man	
Ludlow Whitefriars		Carmelite Friars founded 1350 (1349) by Lawrence of Ludlow; dissolved 1538; granted to Richard Hacket and Thomas Trentham 1559/60	
Lydley Keys Preceptory		Knights Templar founded c.1155-60; dissolved 1308–12	Lydley Preceptory
Minsterley		possible Saxon minster	
Morville Priory		collegiate church before 1066; Benedictine monks priory cell dependent on Shrewsbury; founded 1138 by the Earl of Shrewsbury, collegiate church granted to Shrewsbury as a cell by Robert, Bishop of Hereford; dissolved 1540; granted to Henry Lord Lisle 1545/6	St Gregory ____________________; Morfield Priory
Ratlinghope Priory		Augustinian Canons Regular priory cell founded before 1200; Augustinian Canons Regular — Victorine priory cell dependent on Wigmore, Herefordshire; before 1209; dissolved 1538; granted to Robert Long 1545/6	St Giles ____________________; Ratlingcope Priory
Shrewsbury Abbey ^{+}		Benedictine monks founded 1083-6 (c.1080) by Roger de Montgomery, Earl of Arundel; dissolved 1540; granted to Edward Watson and Henry Herdson 1541/2; part of church now in parochial use	The Abbey Church of Saint Peter and Saint Paul, Shrewsbury (nave dedicated to The Holy Cross)
Shrewsbury Austin Friars, earlier site		Augustinian Friars founded c.1255 by the Stafford family: Henry III granted land to 'poor brethren of Cowlane' (possible Austin Friars) June 1254; transferred to new site (see immediately below) 1290–8	
Shrewsbury Austin Friars		Augustinian Friars (under the Limit of Lincoln) community founded at earlier site (see immediately above) c.1255; transferred here 1290–1298; dissolved 1538; granted to Richard Andrews and Nicholas Temple 1543/4	
Shrewsbury Blackfriars		Dominican Friars (under the Visitation of Oxford) founded before 1232 by Lady Genevile; dissolved 1539; granted to Richard Andrews and Nicholas Temple 1543/4	
Shrewsbury Greyfriars		Franciscan Friars Minor, Conventual (under the Custody of Worcester) founded 1245-6 by Hawise, Countess of Powys; dissolved 1538; granted to Richard Andrews and Nicholas Temple 1543/4	
Snead Priory		Augustinian Canons Regular founded c.1190; transferred to Chirbury c.1195	
Stanton Long Camera		Knights Templar camera or grange; founded c.1221 (before 1228); dissolved 1308–12	
Stitt Cell		Augustinian Canons Regular (?)cell dependent on Haughmond — evidence lacking	
Wenlock Nunnery		Saxon nuns founded c.680 by Merwald, King of West Mercia (or his daughter St Milburga); ruined; Cluniac house built on site (see immediately below)	
Wenlock Priory		possible secular canons — minster founded c.1050: built by Earl Leofric; Cluniac monks alien house: dependent on La Charité: monks invited by Roger de Montgomery, Earl of Shrewsbury, built on site of ruined Saxon nunnery (see immediately above); became denizen: independent from 1395; dissolved 26 January 1540; granted to Augustino de Augustinis 1544/5; (EH)	The Priory Church of Saint Michael and Saint Milburga, Wenlock ____________________; Much Wenlock Priory
Whitchurch		possibly Saxon minster at Album Monasterium	
White Ladies Priory		Augustinian Canonesses founded c.1199(?); dissolved 1538(?): granted to William Whorwood 1539/40; house built on site (EH)	St Leonard ____________________; Brewood White Ladies Priory; Brewood Priory
Wombridge Priory		Augustinian Canons Regular transferred from Dodlinch, Somerset before? 1226; founded 1130-5 by William de Hadley; dissolved 1536; granted to James Leveson 1539/40; conventual church continued in parochial use until mid-17th century when ruinous; Lady Chapel in use until destroyed in a storm 1756; new parish church built, rebuilt 19th century, in use as current parish church	The Holy Trinity, St Mary Virgin, and St Thomas Martyr ____________________; Wombride Priory
Woodhouse Austin Friars		Augustinian Friars (under the Limit of Lincoln) founded c.1250: granted by the Turberviles (Tubervilles); dissolved August 1538; granted to Thomas Reeves and George Cotton	

Return to top of page

=== Somerset ===
(For references and location detail see List of monastic houses in Somerset)

Foundation	Image	Communities & provenance	Formal name or dedication & alternative names
Athelney Abbey ^{#}	Stone obelisk surrounded by railings set in green fields and trees	possible early hermitage or monastery founded c.878?; Benedictine? monks founded c.888 by King Alfred (possibly enlarging pre-existing establishment); Benedictine monks (re)founded c.960; dissolved 8 February 1539; granted to John Clayton 1544/5; now on private land, the site of church is marked by a monument erected 1801	The Abbey of Saint Peter, Saint Paul and Saint Athelwine, Athelney
Bablew Grange		Cluniac monks grange and chapel dependent on Montacute	Bablew Priory
Banwell Monastery		Saxon monastery granted to Asser by Alfred c.888; St Andrew's Church, Banwell, possibly on site (alternative possible sites)	
Barlynch Priory		Augustinian Canons Regular founded between 1154 and 1189 (between 1174(?) and 1220), reputedly by William de Say; dissolved before July 1537; granted to Sir John Wallop 1538/9; remains now on site of Barlynch Farm; now in ownership of Working for Wildlife	The Priory Church of Saint Nicholas, Barlinch ____________________; Barlinch Priory
Barrow Gurney Nunnery		Benedictine nuns founded c.1200 by ___ Gurney, Lord of Stoke Hamden; dissolved 1536; granted to William Clerke 1544/5; incorporated into Barrow Court	The Blessed Virgin Mary and St Edmund, King and Martyr ____________________; Minchin Barrow Priory; Minchinbarrow Priory; Bearwe Priory; Borrow Gurney Priory
Bath Abbey ^{+}	Large floodlight stone building with tower	Saxon nuns founded c.676, reputedly by King Osric, who granted land to Bertana, abbess; destroyed and rebuilt several times; monks refounded before 758; secular? 775; Benedictine? monks refounded 963/4; episcopal diocesan cathedral 1090; dissolved 1539; granted to Humphrey Colles 1542/3; conventual church now in parochial use	The Abbey Church of Saint Peter and Saint Paul, Bath
Bedminster Monastery	Historical county location. See entry under Bristol		
Brent Cell ^{~}		Benedictine monks purported cell dependent on Glastonbury	East Brent Cell
Bridgwater Greyfriars ^		Franciscan Friars (under the Custody of Bristol) founded c.1245 by William Bruer (Briwere); church consecrated 1445 (after rebuilt/extended); dissolved 13 September 1538	Bridge Water Friary
Bristol Austin Friars	Historical county location. See entry under Bristol		
Bristol Eremites Friars	Historical county location. See entry under Bristol		
Bristol Preceptory	Historical county location. See entry under Bristol		
Bruton Abbey		Benedictine monks abbey(?) founded c.1005 by Algar, Earl of Cornwall; dissolved before 1086(?); Augustinian Canons Regular refounded 1127-1135 by William de Mohun raised to abbey status 1511; dissolved 1 April 1539; granted to Maurice Berkely 1545/6	
Buckland Priory		Augustinian Canons Regular founded c.1166 by William de Arlegh (Erlegh), Lord of Durston; dissolved c.1180; Knights Hospitaller preceptory refounded c.1180; dissolved 1433 together with priory of Sisters of St John of Jerusalem (see immediately below); refounded c.1180; dissolved after 1500; Augustinian Canons Regular priory or hospital; refounded after 1500; dissolved 10 February 1539; granted to Alexander Popham and William Halley 1544/5; site now occupied by Buckland Farm	John the Baptist ____________________; Minchin Buckland Preceptory; Buckland Sororum
Buckland Sisters of St John Priory		Sisters of St John of Jerusalem transferred from Carbrooke, Clanfield, Gosford, Hampton, Hogshaw, Shingay, Standon and Swingfield; refounded c.1180; together with Knights Hospitaller Preceptory on the site of former Augustinian Canons Regular priory (see immediately above); dissolved after 1500; Augustinian Canons Regular priory or hospital founded on site (see immediately above); site now occupied by Buckland Farm	St Mary and St Nicholas
Burtle Priory		hermitage, endowed by William son of Godfrey of Eddington 1199; Augustinian Canons Regular priory cell dependent on Glastonbury 1267; refounded before 1270; independent from 1275; dissolved 1536; granted to John and James Bisse 1553/4: parochial church of St Philip and St James Church built on the site	The Holy Trinity, the Blessed Virgin Mary and St Stephen ____________________; Burtle Moor Priory; St Stephens Chapel, Sprauellissmede; Byrkley Priory; Burcle Priory; Bercle Priory; Brademers Priory
Cannington Priory		Benedictine nuns — from Dorset founded c.1138 by Robert de Courcey; transferred to Colwich, Staffordshire; converted into a mansion; reverted to nunnery; dissolved 1536; granted to Edward Rogers 1538/9; remains incorporated into Cannington Court, built on site	Canyngton Nunnery
Charterhouse on Mendip		Carthusian monks grange (purported cell) dependent on Witham; granted Robert May 1544/5	
Cheddar Monastery		reference to community 978; called a minster	
Chewstoke Cell		cell(?) founded (?) by Elizabeth de Sancta Cruce; dissolved before 1500(?)	Holy Cross
Clevedon Friary *		Franciscan Friars Minor extant	Friary and Parish of the Immaculate Conception
Cleeve Abbey	Long red brick building with grey roof.	Cistercian monks — from Revesby founded between 1186 and 1191, land granted by William de Roumare (Romara), Earl of Lincoln (building apparently begun by 1198 - 24 or 25 June 1198); dissolved 1536; granted to Thomas, Earl of Sussex 1541/2; (EH)	Vallis Florida; Clyve Abbey; Cliff Abbey
Dodlinch Priory ^{~}		Augustinian Canons Regular — Victorine possibly initially dependent on Bristol; associated with the Victorine abbey at Bristol; founded c.1210 by William de Courtney; transferred to new site at Woodspring ?before 1226; dissolved 1230	Dodelyng Priory
Downside Abbey *	Ornate building with central tower. To the right is a stone building with green roof and to the left a new building with large glass windows.	Benedictine monks (community founded at Douai 1607); transferred from Douai founded 1814	The Abbey Church of Saint Gregory the Great, Downside, Stratton-on-Fosse
Dunster Priory ^{+}		Benedictine monks dependent on Bath; founded c.1100 (after 1090) by William de Mohun; dissolved 1539; granted to Humphrey Colles 1542/3; church in parochial use as the Priory Church of St George	Priory Church of St George
Frome Monastery		Saxon (Benedictine?) monks — purportedly from Malmesbury; founded after 675 by St Aldhelm; dissolved before 690?	
Glastonbury Abbey		Saxon monks founded c.6th century(?); Benedictine? monks founded c.705; secular 9th century? Benedictine monks (re)founded(?) c.960; dissolved 15 November 1539; granted to Edward, Duke of Somerset 1547/8; granted to Sir Peter Carew 1558/9; ruins purchased by the Bath and Wells Diocesan Trust 1908; now in ownership of the registered charity Glastonbury Abbey Trust with public access	The Abbey Church of Saint Mary, Glastonbury
Green Ore Cell(?)		Benedictine monks 'cell of Glaston'; probable grange of Hinton Charterhouse	Green Oare
Haselbury Priory		hermitage to 1154; Augustinian Canons Regular; William fitz Walter began house — apparently not completed; possibly destroyed in the contests of the barons	
Hinton Priory		Carthusian monks (community founded 1222 at Hatherop, Gloucestershire 1222); transferred here May 1232; dissolved 1539; now in private ownership without public access	Hinton Charterhouse
Ilchester Blackfriars ^{#}		Dominican Friars founded between 1221 and 1260; dissolved 1538; demolished early 19th century	
Ilchester Nunnery		hospital founded c.1217-1220 by William Dennis (Dacus); Augustinian Canonesses refounded before 1281; dissolved before 1463	Whitehall Hospital of the Holy Trinity ____________________; Blanchesale Hospital; Whitehall Hospital
Ilminster		possible Saxon minster; land granted to Muchelney by King Ine; no record of community	
Keynsham Abbey	Low stone walls in grass, surrounded by trees with a house in the dissolvedtance.	Augustinian Canons Regular founded c.1170 by William, Earl of Gloucester dissolved 1539; granted to Thomas Bridges, Esq 1552/3	
Kilve Chantry	Stone wall with window of ruined building.	founded 1329 by Simon de Furneaux; dissolved late 14th century damaged by fire in 1848	
Langley Priory		uncertain order and foundation house of St Mary, brothers or canons, short-lived establishment 12th century	
Martock Priory		granted to Humphry Colles 1542/3	
Moorlynch Cell		Benedictine monks cell dependent on Glastonbury	
Montacute Priory		Cluniac monks founded between c.1078 and 1102 by William, Count of Mortain dissolved 1539; granted to Robert, Earl of Leicester 1573/4; remains now part of Abbey Farmhouse	Montecute; Mons Acutus
Muchelney Abbey	Stone building with square tower. In the foreground are low walls of the ruins amongst the grass.	Benedictine? monks founded before 693 traditionally by King Ine; destroyed in raids by the Danes(?)c.878 secular collegiate? founded 939 by King Athelstan; Benedictine monks founded c.950 (959); dissolved 3 January 1538; granted to Edward, Earl of Hertford 1537/8; (EH)	Michelney Abbey
Pennard Minster		Saxon minster	
Pitminster		possible Saxon minster	
Potbury Priory		Augustinian Canons Regular possible priory dependent on Bristol — no record of cell	
Regil Grange		Cistercian monks grange? dependent on Flaxley; founded before 1200(?)	
Stavordale Priory		Augustinian Canons Regular — Vitorine founded before 1243 by a member of the Lovel family; merged with Taunton 1533; granted to John, Earl of Oxford 1544/5; conventual church converted into a private house, renovated and extended in 1905	Slaverdale Priory
Steep Holme Cell		Augustinian Canons Regular cell dependent on Studley, Oxfordshire; founded before 1260; dissolved before 1300	
Stogursey Priory		Benedictine monks alien house: dependent on Lonlay 1183; founded 1100-07: church granted by William de Falaise and his wife Geva; granted to Eton College 1440; last prior left 1442	Stoke Courcy Priory
Taunton Priory ^{#}		secular collegiate founded before 904; Augustinian Canons Regular founded c.1120 (c.1115) by William Giffard, Bishop of Winchester; dissolved 1539; granted to Mathew Colehurst 1544/5; part of remains now called 'Priory Barn'; converted into a cricket museum	The Priory Church of Saint Peter and Saint Paul, Taunton
Taunton Whitefriars		Carmelite Friars licence granted 1341; revoked 1343; house never established	
Templecombe Preceptory		Knights Templar granted by Serlo FitzOdo in 1185. founded c.1185 dissolved 1308–12; Knights Hospitaller granted 1312 dissolved 1539; granted to Richard Andrews and Leonard Chamberlayne	Combe Templariorum; Temple Comb Preceptory
Witham Friary ^{+}		Carthusian monks founded 1178/9 (1180/1); dissolved 1539; granted to Ralph Hopton 1544/5; church now in parochial use	The Friary Church of the Blessed Virgin Mary, Witham The Parish Church of the Blessed Virgin Mary, Saint John Baptist and All Saints, Witham Friary (former lay brothers' church) ____________________; Witham Abbey; Witham Charterhouse; Selwood Friary
Woodspring Priory ^		Augustinian Canons Regular — Victorine (community founded at Dodlinch c.1210); transferred here before 1226; dissolved 1539; granted to William and John Lacy 1559/60; currently in use as an exhibuiltion centre for artwork; (LT)	The Priory Church of the honour of the Holy Trinity, Saint Mary the Virgin and Saint Thomas the Martyr of Canterbury, Worspring ____________________; Worspring Priory
Worminster		Saxon minster	Wormester
Wyrall Nunnery		alleged early nunnery	St Peter ____________________; Wyrall Hill Nunnery
Yenston Priory ^{#}		Benedictine monks alien house: cell or grange(?) dependent on St Sever; founded before c.1090 (before 1100) by Hugh d'Avranches, 1st Earl of Chester (Hugh Abrincis); mentioned in the reign of Edward I; doubtful it ever had status of priory; granted to Eton College c.1468; exchanged for other lands; held by Sir Thomas Bell by 1548; house possibly built on site 16th century; adjacent fields called 'Priory Plot' and 'Priors' possibly associated with the grange	

Return to top of page

=== Staffordshire ===
(For references and location detail see List of monastic houses in Staffordshire)

Foundation	Image	Communities & provenance	Formal name or dedication & alternative names
Baswich Priory		Augustinian Canons Regular founded 1174 (1173-5); land granted by Gerard de Stafford; dissolved 1538; remains incorporated into Priory Farm built on site	The Priory Church of Saint Thomas the Martyr by Stafford
Blithbury Priory ^{#}		Benedictine monks priory cell dependent on Burton; founded after 1129 by Hugh Malveysin; dissolved 1158–65; Benedictine nuns founded after 1129; apparently merged with Black Ladies, Brewood 1158–65; dissolved before 1315(?); alleged chapel demolished 1795	The Priory Church of Saint Giles, Blithbury St Egidius (St Giles) ____________________; Blythbury Priory
Brewood Priory		Benedictine nuns founded before 1150; dissolved 1538; granted to Thomas Gifford 1538/9; late-16th/early-17th century country house built on site	The Priory Church of Saint Mary, Brewood ____________________; Black Ladies Priory; Briwerne Priory; Black Ladies of Brewood Priory
Burton Abbey		Benedictine monks founded 1002 by Wulfric Spott, confirmed by charter of King Ethelred 1004; dissolved 1539; granted to Sir William Paget by Henry VIII; refounded as a college 1541; dissolved 1545	St Mary, Virgin and St Modwen, Virgin ____________________; Modwennestow Abbey; Burton upon Trent Abbey
Calwich Priory		hermitage (hermetorium de Calwich); Augustinian Canons Regular priory cell dependent on Kenilworth, Warwickshire founded between c.1125 and 1149: hermitage granted to Kenilworth by Nicholas de Gresley alias fitzNiel and his wife Margery; independent from 1349; granted to Merton 1535–6; Georgian-style house built on site 1849–50, now derelict	St Margaret ____________________; Calwick Priory
Canwell Priory		Benedictine monks founded c.1142 (1131–48) by Geva, daughter of Hugh, Earl of Chester; dissolved 1524–6, suppressed to found Cardinal Wolsey's college Cardinal College, Oxford; reverted to the Crown; much of the property passed briefly to St George's Chapel, Windsor 1532	The Priory Church of Saint Mary, Saint Giles, and All Saints, Canwell
Colwich Abbey *		Benedictine nuns — from Cannington, Somerset (community founded in Paris 1651 by the English nuns at Cambrai) settled in England 1795 after French Revolution transferred here 1836; returned to English Benedictine Congregation 1926; raised to abbey status 1928	The Abbey Church of Our Lady of Good Hope, Colwich
Cotton Abbey ^{~}		Cistercian monks — from Aunay-sur-Odon founded 1176, granted to Aunay by Bertram de Verdun transferred to new site at Croxden 1178; granted to Jeffrey Foljamb 1544/5	Chotes Abbey; Chotene Abbey
Croxden Abbey		Cistercian monks — from Cotton (community founded at Cotton 1176); transferred here 17 May 1178; dissolved 17 September 1538; (EH)	The Abbey Church of the Vale of Saint Mary at Croxden
Dieulacres Abbey		Cistercian monks transferred from Poulton, Cheshire founded 1214, site granted by Randal de Blunderville, Earl of Chester after 1199; dissolved 20 October 1539; granted to Ralph Bagnall 1552/3; site now in private ownership at Abbey Green	St Mary, Virgin and St Benedict
Dudley Priory		Cluniac monks alien house: dependent on Wenlock, Shropshire; founded 1161 by Ralph Painell, lord of the manor; became denizen: independent from 1395; dissolved 1539; granted to the Bishop of Lichfield 1540/1	St James
Farewell Priory		hermits or canon brothers: unknown order and foundation; Benedictine nuns founded before 1148 (c.1140) by Roger de Clinton; raised to abbey status between 1154 and 1189 (during the reign of Henry II); reduced to priory status before 1210; dissolved 1527; site now occupied by St Bartholomew's Church	The Priory Church of Saint Mary, Farewell ____________________; Farewell Priory
Hawkesyard Priory		Dominican Friars	
Hulton Abbey		Cistercian monks daughter house of Combermere, Cheshire; founded 26 July 1219 by Henry de Audley; dissolved 18 September 1538; granted to Sir Edward Aston 1542/3	Hilton Abbey
Hansury Nunnery		Benedictine? nuns founded c.680 by St Werburgh at the instance of her uncle King Ethelred destroyed in raids by the Danes 875	
Keele Preceptory		Knights Templar land granted by Henry II 1168–9; dissolved 1308-12 granted to the Earl of Gloucester; Knights Hospitaller founded c.1312 (1324); dissolved after 1338; country house named 'Keele Hall' built on site c.1580, rebuilt 1856–61	
Lapley Priory		Benedictine monks alien house: dependent on St-Remi, Riems; founded by Ælfgar (Algar), Earl of Chester; dissolved 1415; granted to Tong College; granted to Sir Richard Mannors 1547/8	Lappele Priory
Lichfield Greyfriars		Franciscan Friars Minor, Conventual (under the Custody of Worcester) founded c.1237 (1229) by Alexander, Bishop of Lichfield; dissolved 1538; granted to Richard Crumbilthorn 1544/5	
Little Haywood Abbey *		Benedictine nuns	The Abbey Church of Saint Mary, Little Haywood
Newcastle-under-Lyme Blackfriars		Dominican Friars (under the Visitation of Oxford) founded before 1277; dissolved 1538; cattlemarket built on site 1871; superstore built on site before 2005	
Oulton Abbey *		Benedictine nuns founded 1853; with girls' boarding school, then playgroup 1968, then care home, St. Benedict's Nursing and Residential Home 1989	The Abbey Church of Saint Mary, Oulton
Radmore Abbey		hermitage founded 1135–9, site granted by King Stephen, confirmed by Roger, Bishop of Lichfield, who allowed the community to adopt the order of their choice Cistercian monks daughter house of Bordesley; converted c.1143/7-1155 monks transferred to Stoneleigh 1155; converted to a royal hunting lodge	The Abbey Church of Saint Mary, Radmore ____________________; Red Moor Priory
Ranton Priory		Augustinian Canons Regular — (?)Arroasian priory cell dependent on Haughmond, Shropshire; founded between 1135 and 1166 by Robert fitz Noel (Noeli); independent from 1246–7; dissolved 1536; granted to Robert Wiseman 1538/9	St Mary ____________________; Ronton Abbey; de Sartis
Rocester Abbey ^{$(?)}		Augustinian Canons Regular founded c.1146 by Richard Bacon (Bacoun); dissolved 1538; granted to Richard Trentham 1539/40	The Blessed Virgin Mary ____________________; Roucester Abbey
Sandwell Priory	Historical county location. See entry under the West Midlands		
Stafford Austin Friars		Augustinian Friars (under the Limit of Lincoln) founded 1344 by Ralph de Stafford, permission granted by the Pope 1343; dissolved August 1538, surrendered to Richard Ingworth, Bishop of Dover; granted to Thomas Neve and Giles Isam	Austin Friars, Stafford
Stafford Greyfriars		Franciscan Friars Minor, Conventual (under the Custody of Worcester) founded before 1274; dissolved 10 August 1538, surrendered to Richard Ingworth, Bishop of Dover; granted to James Leverson 1539/40; house called 'Grey Friars' built on site before 1610	
Priory of St Thomas nr. Stafford			
Stone Priory		secular canons founded c.670 by Wulfhere, King of Mercia destroyed in raids by the Danes 9th century, canons dispersed; Benedictine nuns apparently founded before 1066; replaced or dispersed before c.1135; Augustinian Canons Regular priory cell dependent on Kenilworth, Warwickshire; granted to Kenilworth; founded c.1135 by Enisan de Waleron; independent from after 1260; dissolved 1536; granted to George Harper 1538/9	St Wulfad and St Rufin St Wulfad St Mary, St Wulfad and St Michael
Trentham Priory		possible minster before 1066 possible Benedictine monks possibly founded c.1087-1100 subsequently lapsing; Augustinian Canons Regular (re)founded before 1153-5 by Ranuph II, Earl of Chester; dissolved 1537 (1536)	The Priory Church of the Blessed Virgin Mary and All Saints, Trentham ____________________; Trickingham Priory(?)
Tutbury Priory ^{+}		Benedictine monks alien house: dependent on S-Pierre-sur-Dives; founded after 1080 (1066–1086) by Henry de Ferrers; became denizen: independent from after 1431–3; dissolved 14 September 1538; granted to Sir William Cavendish 1552/3; part of conventual church now in parochial use	St Mary Virgin
Wolverhampton Monastery	Historical county location. See entry under the West Midlands		

Return to top of page

=== Suffolk ===
(For references and location detail see List of monastic houses in Suffolk)

Foundation	Image	Communities & provenance	Formal name or dedication and alternative names
Alnesbourne Priory		Augustinian Canons Regular founded c.1200, probably by Alberte de Neville, who granted endowments; appropriated to Woodbridge probably c.1466; dissolved before 1514; granted to Sir John Wingfield 1541/2	The Priory Church of the Blessed Virgin Mary, Alnesbourne ____________________; Alnesbourn Priory; Alnesborn Priory; Alensborne Priory
Babwell Greyfriars		Franciscan Friars Minor, Conventual (under the Custody of Cambridge) transferred from earlier foundation at Bury St Edmunds; founded 19 November 1262; dissolved December 1538, surrendered to Richard Yngworth, Bishop of Dover; granted to Anthony Harvey May 1541	
Battisford Preceptory		Knights Hospitaller preceptory/hospital founded c.1154, benefactions from Henry II; dissolved 1540	
Blakenham Priory		Benedictine monks alien house: dependent on Bec-Hellouin Abbey; manor granted to Bec-Hellouin by Walter Giffard, 'Earl of Buckingham' founded before 1092; dissolved before 1230, apparently reduced to grange; transferred as a parcel to Ogbourne St George; granted to Eton College 1460	Great Blakenham Priory
Blythburgh Blackfriars		Dominican Friars licence obtained 1384 to move from Dunwich, when that location was threatened by the sea but transfer never implemented	
Blythburgh Priory		Augustinian Canons Regular — from St. Osyth's Abbey, Essex ependent on St Osyth; founded before 1135, assisted by Henry I and the Clavering family; dissolved 12 February 1537 and granted to Sir Arthur Hopton 1538/9	The Priory Church of the Blessed Virgin Mary, Blythburgh ____________________; Bliburgh Priory
Bruisyard Abbey		secular college (community founded at Campsey Ash 1347); transferred here 1354; dissolved 4 October 1366; Franciscan nuns — from Waterbeach, Cambridgeshire founded 1364-7 by Lionel, Duke of Clarence; dissolved 1359; granted to Nicholas Hare 1539	Brusyard Priory
Bungay Priory ^{+}		Benedictine nuns founded 1183 by Roger de Glanvill and his wife, Countess Gundred; dissolved 1336; nuns appear to have abandoned the house before April 1536; granted to Thomas, Duke of Norfolk 1537/8; most of conventual buildings destroyed by fire 1688; rebuilt 1699; reopened 1701 for parochial use as the Parish Church of St Mary	The Priory Church of Saint Mary and the Holy Cross, Bungay
Bury St Edmunds Abbey		Saxon (Benedictine?) monks founded 633 by Sigeberht, King of the East Angles; destroyed in raids by the Danes c.870 secular (collegiate) founded 903; refounded c.925, endowed by King Athelstan; Benedictine monks founded 1020-2; dissolved 4 November 1539; granted to John Eyre 1559/60; subsequently granted to Thomas Badyby; abbot's palace in use as a house until 1720; other buildings incorporated into houses 17th and 19th century: extant; remains now within a public park; (EH) episcopal diocesan Bury St Edmunds Cathedral in precinct	The Abbey Church of Saint Edmund, (Bury Saint Edmunds); Beordicsworth Abbey; Bury St Edmond Abbey
Bury St Edmunds Greyfriars, earlier site		Franciscan Friars Minor, Conventual (under the Custody of Cambridge) foundation attempted 1233, but discouraged by the legate and monks of the Abbey; founded shortly after 22 June 1257: bull obtained from the Pope to establish their community; expelled by Abbey officials; re-established at a new site (see immediately below)	
Bury St Edmunds Greyfriars		Franciscan Friars Minor, Conventual (under the Custody of Cambridge) (previous, unsuccessful foundation at earlier site (see immediately above)); founded 1258, with the assistance of Henry III; Pope Urban IV ordered the friars to demolish their buildings; re-established at Babwell	
Butley Priory ^		Augustinian Canons Regular founded 1171 by Sir Ranulph de Glanvill; dissolved 1 March 1538; remains incorporated into later buildings	The Priory Church of the Blessed Virgin Mary, Butley; Butleigh Priory
Campsey Ash Priory		Augustinian Canonesses founded c.1195 by Theobald de Valoines, who granted land to his sisters Joan (subsequently the first prioress) and Agnes; (also given as Benedictine); dissolved 1536; granted to Sir William Willoughby 1543/4; post-medieval house and barn occupy site	The Priory Church of Saint Mary, Campsey Ash; The Blessed Virgin Mary; Campsey Priory; Campess Priory
Cavenham Preceptory		Knights Templar founded before 1311?; dissolved 1308-12(?)	Togrynd Preceptory; Caveham Preceptory; Coddenham Preceptory
Chipley Priory ^{#}		Augustinian Canons Regular founded before 1291 (before 1235); dissolved 1468; annexed to the college of Stoke by Clare 1468; farmhouse occupies site, incorporating part of the west range of the monastic buildings, though no remains identifiably as early as 13th century	The Priory Church of the Blessed Virgin Mary, Chipley
Clare Friary *		Augustinian Friars (under the Limit of Cambridge) founded 1248/9 by Richard de Clare, Earl of Gloucester and Hereford; cell dependent on Bec-Hellouin; reconstituted 1326 by Edward II as a cell dependent on Westminster, Middlesex; refounded as a college 1490 by Edmund, Earl of March dissolved 1538; granted to Richard Friend 1539/40; Augustinian Friars — from Ireland refounded 1953; extant; former infirmary/barn in use as friars' chapel	The Priory Church of Our Lady, Saint Peter and Saint Paul and Saint Augustine, Clare ____________________; Clare Priory
Clare Priory		secular collegiate founded c.1045 Benedictine monks alien house: dependent on Bec-Hellouin; founded 1090: collegiate church of St John the Baptist granted to Bec by Gilbert de Clare; transferred to new site at Stoke by Clare	
Coddenham Camera		Knights Hospitaller a member of Battisford	
Coddenham Priory		Eustace de Merch originally intended to found a house of Cistercian nuns from Nun Appleton during the reign of Henry II; Augustinian Canons Regular dependent on Royston, Hertfordshire; founded before 1184 by Eustace de Merch, who granted the church to Royston; dissolved 1537	Covenham Priory
Creeting St Mary Priory		Benedictine monks alien house: (probable) grange dependent on Bernay; founded before 1156; supervised by a prior from 1327; dissolved before 1414; granted to Eton College 1462	
Creeting St Olave Priory		Benedictine monks alien house: cell or grange, under supervision of a prior, dependent on Grestein; founded before 1087; monks have been suggested to have used the parish church of St Olave ^{#}; dissolved 1360; sold privately	
Dodnash Priory ^{#}		Augustinian Canons Regular founded c.1188 by Baldwin de Toeni and his mother Alda; dissolved 1525, suppressed for Cardinal Wolsey's colleges at Oxford and Ipswich; granted to Thomas Alverde; in use as a farmhouse 19th century; some of the re-used masonry incorporated into the buildings of Dodnash Priory Farm	The Priory Church of the Blessed Virgin Mary, Dodnash
Dunwich Blackfriars		Dominican Friars (under the Visitation of Cambridge) founded before 1256 by Sir Roger de Holish; licence granted 1384 to move to Blythburgh due to threat of incursion by the sea; dissolved 1538; granted to John Eyre 1544/5; destroyed by coastal erosion and submerged by the sea	
Dunwich, Greyfriars, earlier site		Franciscan Friars Minor, Conventual (under the Custody of Cambridge) founded before 1277 (?before 1272: during the reign of Henry III) by Robert Fitz John; transferred to new site (see immediately below) 1290, due to coastal erosion	
Dunwich Greyfriars		Franciscan Friars Minor, Conventual (under the Custody of Cambridge) (community founded at earlier site (see immediately above) before 1277 (?before 1272)); transferred here due to coastal erosion 1290; dissolved 1538; surrendered to Ingworth, Bishop of Dover; granted to John Eyre	
Dunwich Preceptory		Knights Templar founded before 1199; dissolved 1308-12 passed to Knights Hospitaller, who maintained a chaplain but no preceptory here; destroyed by coastal erosion and submerged by the sea	
Dunwich Priory		Benedictine monks alien house: dependent on Eye (itself dependent on Bernay); founded after 1080, church granted to Eye by William the Conqueror; submerged by the sea between 1272 and 1307 (in/about the reign of Edward I)	St Felix?
East Bergholt Abbey *		Benedictine nuns land purchased 1857; extant	The Abbey Church of Saint Mary, East Bergholt
Edwardstone Priory ^{#}		Benedictine monks Priory cell dependent on Abingdon, Berkshire (Oxfordshire) founded 1114, church granted to Abingdon by Hubert de Monchesney, confirmed 1115; dissolved c.1160: community transferred to Earl's Colne by Abbot Walkelin	The Blessed Virgin Mary
Eye Priory		Benedictine monks alien house: dependent on Bernay; founded c.1080 by Robert Malet; became denizen: independent, refounded c.1385; dissolved October 1534/1537	The Priory Church of Saint Peter, Eye
Felixstowe Priory, possible earlier site		Benedictine monks Priory cell dependent on Rochester Cathedral, Kent; founded c.1105 (before 1107); church of St Felix granted to Rochester by Roger Bigod; possibly transferred from this site to a new location (see immediately below) 14th century	
Felixstowe Priory		Benedictine monks Priory cell dependent on Rochester Cathedral, Kent; founded c.1105 (before 1107) (possibly at earlier site (see immediately above)); church of St Felix granted to Rochester by Roger Bigod; absence of a church infers the monks used the parish church of St Mary dissolved 1538: suppressed for Wolsey's college at Ipswich (formal grant 30 December 1528); granted to the Duke of Norfolk on the suppression of Ipswich College; granted to Thomas Seckford (Sexford) 1576/7	Walton Priory; Walton, St Felix; Wilton St Felix Priory; Fylstowe Priory; Filstou Priory
Flixton Priory ^?		Augustinian Canonesses founded 1258 by Marjory (Margery) Harnes, widow of Bartholomew de Crek (Clerk/Creke); dissolved 1537; granted to Richard Warton 1537; granted to John Tasburgh 1544; remains of conventual church possibly incorporated into Abbey Farmhouse, 16th/17th century	The Priory Church of the Blessed Virgin Mary and Saint Katharine, Flixton
Gislingham Preceptory ^{#}		Knights Templar founded before 1228 by Sir Robert de Burgate; dissolved before 1308(?); destroyed 1338; granted to John Grene and Robert Hall 1553	Giselingham Preceptory
Great Bricett Priory ^{+}		Augustinian Canons Regular alien house: dependent on St-Léonard-de-Noblat founded c.1110 (1114-9) by Ralph fitz Brien and his wife Emma; destroyed by fire 1416; apparently re-occupied; dissolved 1444(?); granted by Henry VI to his college in Cambridge; remains of conventual church incorporated into current parish church of SS Mary and Lawrence	The Priory Church of Saint Leonard, Bricett ____________________; Bricett Priory; Bresete Priory
Hadleigh Monastery		supposed Saxon monastery	
Hoxne Priory		Secular collegiate founded before 951 by Theodred, Bishop of London probably destroyed soon after; joint cathedral with North Elmham before 1040 to 1072?; Benedictine monks church of St Peter and chapel of St Edmund, King and Martyr granted to Norwich, Norfolk by Bishop Herbert Losinga 1101; chapel rebuilt, endowed and granted by Maurice of Windsor and his wife Egidis for a convent of monks 1130; dissolved 1538; granted to Richard Gresham 1546/7	Hoxon Priory
Icanho Monastery ^{~}		Saxon Benedictine? monks founded 653-4 by St Botolph; destroyed in raids by the Danes c.870; also suggested to have been in Lincolnshire	Ikanho Monastery; Iken Monastery
Ipswich Austin Friars		Augustinian Friars founded during the reign of Henry III by Henry de Manesby and others; dissolved; granted to William Sabyne 1541/2	
Ipswich Blackfriars		Dominican Friars (under the Visitation of Cambridge) founded 1263; dissolved 1538	
Ipswich Greyfriars		Franciscan Friars Minor, Conventual (under the Custody of Cambridge) founded before 1236; dissolved 1535	
Ipswich — Holy Trinity Priory		Augustinian Canons Regular founded c.1133, endowed largely by Norman Gastrode fitz Eadnoth, one of the first canons, before 1177; dissolved 1537; destroyed by fire and rebuilt 1194, by the bishop of Norwich; dissolved 1537; granted to Sir Thomas Pope 1544/5	The Priory Church of the Holy Trinity, Ipswich; Christchurch
Ss Peter & Paul Priory, Ipswich		Augustinian Canons Regular founded c.1190 (late in the reign of Henry II) by [the ancestors of] Thomas Lacy and his wife Alice; dissolved May 1528, suppressed for Wolsey's college at Ipswich; granted to Richard Percival and Edmund Duffield 1611/2	The Priory Church of Saint Peter and Saint Paul, Ipswich
Ipswich Priory		Augustinian Canons Regular founded during the reign of William the Conqueror by Gilbert Blund; dissolved; granted to Richard Codington 1538/9	
Ipswich Whitefriars		Carmelite Friars founded before c.1271 (1278); rededicated 1477 after a probable major rebuild; dissolved 1538; granted to John Eyre 1544/5	
Ixworth Priory, earlier site		possible early projection c.1100 either failed or lapsed; Augustinian Canons Regular founded c.1170 by a member of the Blunt family destroyed during civil warfare;	The Priory Church of the Blessed Virgin Mary, Ixworth
Ixworth Priory ^		Augustinian Canons Regular founded c.1170, on a different site from the original foundation; dissolved 1537; remains incorporated into house named 'Ixworth Abbey' built on site	The Priory Church of the Blessed Virgin Mary, Ixworth; Ixworth Abbey
Kersey Priory ^		hospital founded 1218 by Thomas de Burgh; Augustinian Canons Regular founded before 1219; dissolved 1443-4; granted to SS Mary and Nicholas, Cambridge (afterwards King's College, Cambridge) (1533/4?)	The Priory Church of the Blessed Virgin Mary and Saint Anthony, Kersey
Lavenham Priory ^		Benedictine monks converted into mansion latterly open to public, now hotel accommodation	
Leiston Abbey ^		Premonstratensian Canons from Welbeck Abbey, Nottinghamshire (community founded at Old Leiston 1183); transferred here 1365; dissolved 1536; granted to Charles Brandon, Duke of Suffolk 1537; parts of the conventual church incorporated into later buildings; remains incorporated into house named 'Abbey House' built on site 17th century; (EH)	Leyestone Abbey
Letheringham Priory		Augustinian Canons Regular dependent on SS Peter & Paul, Ipswich; founded c.1194 by William de Bovile; dissolved 1537; granted to Elizabeth Naunton, daughter of Sir Antony Naunton of Wingfield 1553;	The Priory Church of the Blessed Virgin Mary, Letheringham; Letherington Priory
Little Welnetham Priory		Trinitarian	
Mendham Priory		Cluniac monks alien house: dependent on Castle Acre Priory, Norfolk; founded before 1155 by William Huntingfield; became denizen: independent from sometime between 1351 and 1374; dissolved 1537; granted to Richard Freston	All Saints; Mindham Priory
Old Leiston Abbey		Premonstratensian Canons daughter house of Welbeck Abbey, Nottinghamshire; founded 1183 by Sir Ranulph de Glanvil; obtained licence from pope Urban V to move to another site due to flooding; transferred to new site at Leiston 1365; old site continued in use as a cell	The Blessed Virgin Mary
Orford Austin Friars		Augustinian Friars (under the Limit of Cambridge) founded 1295-9, land granted by Robert Hewell 1205, building appears to have begun 1299; dissolved December 1538	
Redlingfield Priory ^		Benedictine nuns founded c.1120 by Manasses, Count of Giusnes (Ghisnes) and his wife Emma; dissolved 10 February 1537; granted to Edmund Bedingfield 1536/7; house rebuilt 1875; monastic remains incorporated into barn	The Priory Church of the Blessed Virgin Mary and Saint Andrew, Redlingfield
Ringshall Cell (?)		Benedictine monks purportedly a cell; free chapel belonging to Norwich granted to Hoxne	
Rumburgh Priory ^{+}		possible site of Saxon minster or monastery, 11th century; Benedictine monks Priory dependent on St. Benet's Abbey, Norfolk founded between 1047 and 1064 by Æthelmær, Bishop of Elmham and Thurston, Abbot of St Benet of Hulme and Oxenedes possibly subsequently dependent on St Mélanie, Rennes; cell dependent on St Mary's Abbey, York, York c.1137: granted to York by Stephen, Earl of Brittany 1135; dissolved 1528; suppressed for Wolsey's college at Ipswich; conventual church in parochial use as the Parish Church of St Michael	ThePriory Church of Saint Michael and Saint Felix, Rumburgh; Wisseta Priory
St. Olaves Priory, Herringfleet		Augustinian Canons Regular founded c.1216 by Roger fitz Osbert; dissolved 1537; purchased by Sir Henry Jerningham, who built house on site 1547, incorporating monastic remains; demolished 1784, and stone removed to repair Herringfleet church; refectory undercroft converted to a cottage 1825 in use until 1902	The Priory Church of Saint Olave, Heringfleet St Mary and St Olave, King and Martyr; Herringfleet Priory
Sibton Abbey		Cistercian monks from Warden Abbey, Bedfordshire founded 22 February 1150 (1149) by William de Cayneto (Cheyney); dissolved 1536; granted to Thomas Howard, Duke of Norfolk; sold to John Scrivener 1610; house built on the site, demolished later 18th century; site currently within the estate of 19th century house named 'Sibton Abbey', without public access	The Abbey Church of Saint Mary, Sibton Abbey
Snape Priory ^{#}		Benedictine monks cell dependent on St John's Abbey Colchester, Essex founded 1155 by William Martel, his wife and son; dependent on Butley, granted by Henry VIII; dissolved 19 January 1525; Abbey Farm possibly occupies the site, though buildings appear not to incorporate monastic remains	St Mary
South Elmham Monastery		apparent religious centre 7th century	
Stoke by Clare Priory		Benedictine monks alien house: dependent on Bec-Hellouin Abbey; (community founded at Clare before 1090); transferred here 1124 from Clare; dissolved 1415; became a secular college; enlarged 1897 by Lutyens; dissolved 1548, converted into a mansion; present house currently in use as a school named 'Stoke College'; church rebuilt and in parochial use as the Parish Church of St John the Baptist;	
Stoke-by-Nayland Monastery (?)		monks or secular college founded before 946 (?) possibly during the reign of King Edmund by Alfgar who left bequest to the community of Stoke; land granted to Ely by King Edgar	
BlackFriars, Sudbury		Dominican Friars (under the Visitation of Cambridge) founded before 1247 by Baldwin de Shipling; dissolved 1539; granted to Thomas Eden, Esq. 1539/40 demolished for a residential house; 'Priory Wall' is sleeper wall of 'Priory Gate', built shortly before dissolution	
Sudbury Augustinian Priory ^{#}		Augustinian Canons Regular	
Sudbury Benedictine Priory ^{#}		Benedictine monks cell dependent on Westminster Abbey Middlesex; founded c.1115 by Wilfric; chapel built early-15th century, but monastic buildings appear not to have been built; dissolved c.1538; granted to the Dean and Chapter of Westminster 1542/3; Priory house demolished 1779	St Bartholomew's Chapel
Wangford Priory		Cluniac monks cell dependent on Thetford Priory, Norfolk; founded before 1160 by Doudo Asini; became denizen: independent from sometime between 1376 and 1393; granted to Thomas, Duke of Norfolk 1540/1; last remains demolished 19th century	
Welnetham Crutched Friars		Crutched Friars dependent on London, Middlesex; chapel of St Thomas Martyr granted to London; founded before 1274; dissolved 1538	
Wherstead Priory		uncertain order and foundation; alleged 13th century monastery at Wervestede	
Wickham Skeyth Priory		Benedictine monks dependent on St. John's Abbey, Colchester, Essex; founded after 1135 (early in the reign of Stephen) by Robert de Salchovilla (Sakeville), later a monk at Colchester; dissolved c.1164, transferred to Colchester by consent of Jordan, son of the founder	Wickham Skeith Priory
Woodbridge Priory		Augustinian Canons Regular founded c.1193 by Ernald Rufus (Ernaldus Ruffus); dissolved 1534/7; granted to Thomas Seckford, Master of Requests 1576/7; building constructed on site 1547-64, now in use as school known as 'the Abbey'	The Blessed Virgin Mary
Yenston Grange		Benedictine monks alien house: grange dependent on St-Sever; foundation and dissolution unknown	

Return to top of page

=== Surrey ===
(For references and location detail see List of monastic houses in Surrey)

Foundation	Image	Communities & provenance	Formal name or dedication & alternative names
Almners Priory		17th century priory	
Bermondsey Abbey	Historical county location. See London		
Bermondsey Minster	Historical county location. See London		
Chertsey Abbey		Saxon Benedictine? monks founded 666; destroyed in raids by the Danes c.872 secular Benedictine monks refounded before 964; dissolved 1537	The Abbey Church of Saint Peter, Chertsey
Guildford Blackfriars		Dominican Friars (under the Visitation of London) founded 1275 by Queen Eleanor of Provence, widow of Henry III; proposal by Edward III to refound as a Dominican nunnery never transpired; dissolved 1538; site now occupied by 'The Friary' shopping centre	St Dominic?
Guildford Friars de Ordine Martyrum		Friars de Ordine Martyrum founded 1260; possible Polish congregation of Crutched Friars; dissolution unknown	
Guildford Crutched Friars (?)		alleged house of Crutched Friars possibly identical with Polish Crutched Friars house (see immediately above)	St Cross?
Horne Priory		Carthusian monks projected: king's licence granted to Mary de St Paul, Countess of Pembroke c.1345 to endow and build a house for Carthusians, appears not to have been completed	Hourne Priory
Horsley Priory ^{≈}		Benedictine nuns supposedly at Rowbarnes, East Horseley; dissolution unknown	
Laleham Abbey *		Benedictine monks founded 13th century; The Community of St Peter the Apostle (Westminster)	
Leatherhead Priory (?)^{≈}		Cistercian monks alleged monastery, founded 1263; incorporated into house called 'The Priory'; evidence lacking	
Merton Priory	Historical county location. See entry under London		
Newark Priory		possible hospital Augustinian Canons Regular founded c.1189 (during or before the reign of Richard I) by Ruald de Calva and his wife Beatrice; dissolved 1539; granted to Sir Antony Brown 1544/5	The Priory Church of The Blessed Virgin Mary and Saint Thomas a Becket, Newark ____________________; Adbury Priory; Aldebury Priory
Oxenford Priory (?)		Benedictine nuns foundation unknown; manor belonged to Waverley (from before 1147), "no trace of separate foundation", dissolved after 1305(?)	
Reigate Priory		hospital founded 1217-1235 by William de Warren, Earl of Surrey; Augustinian Canons Regular founded 1235; also given as Crutched Friars (possibly Flemish branch, or earlier Fratres Cruciferi 'Augustinian Hospitallers') dissolved 1535; granted to William Lord Howard 1541/2; conventual buildings largely demolished and replaced by a house 1541; rebuilt as a Palladian mansion 1771; since 1948 in use as a school located in public Priory Park, with a public museum	
Richmond Friary (Greyfriars and Austin Friars)	Historical county location. See London		
Sheen Priory	Historical county location. See London		
Sheen Friary	Historical county location. See London		
Syon Priory	Historical county location. See London		
Southwark Priory	Historical county location. See London		
Tandridge Priory		hospital founded 1189 by Odo de Dammartin, possibly ceasing to exist 1218-22; Augustinian Canons Regular founded after(?) 1218 (c.1200); dissolved 1538 (1537); granted to John Rede 1537/8	The Priory Church of Saint James, Tandridge ____________________; Tanregge Priory
Tooting Bec Priory	Historical county location. See London		
Wanborough Grange		Cistercian monks grange of Waverley, founded 1130; dissolved 1536; barn restored 1997, owned by Guildford Borough Council, maintained by the Guildford Museum	
Waverley Abbey		Cistercian monks dependent on L'Aumône; founded 24 November 1128 (or 28 October 1129, possibly when functional for full regular life) by William Giffard, Bishop of Winchester; dissolved 1536; granted to Sir William Fitz William 1536/7; (EH)	The Abbey Church of Saint Mary, Waverley
Woking Monastery		Saxon monastery purported dependency of Peterborough founded c.690 (in the time of Abbot Cuthbert) granted to Peterborough by Brordar, and ealdorman, with the consent of Offa; thought to have been destroyed in raids by the Danes 871	St Peter ____________________; Wockingas Monastery; Wocingas Minster; Old Woking Monastery; Woking Minster

Return to top of page

=== Sussex ===
==== East Sussex ====
(For references and location detail see List of monastic houses in East Sussex)

Foundation	Image	Communities & provenance	Formal name or dedication & alternative names location
Battle Abbey		Benedictine monks founded 1067 by William the Conqueror; dissolved 27 May 1538; granted to Sir Antony Brown 1538/9; (EH)	The Abbey Church of the Holy Trinity, Saint Mary and Saint Martin ____________________; St Martin's Abbey; Battel Abbey
Bayham Abbey		Premonstratensian Canons — from Brockley, Kent (Greater London) between 1199 and 1208, and from Otham between 1208 and 1211 daughter house of Prémontré founded c.1207 (1200) by Robert of Thornham (Robert de Turreham); (established on the union of Otham and Brockley Abbeys) dissolved 1525; (EH)	the Blessed Virgin Mary ____________________; Bayham Old Abbey; Beigham Abbey
Beddingham Monastery		Saxon monastery in the reign of Offa (757–96); possibly destroyed in raids by the Danes 9th century	
Hailsham Cell		Premonstratensian Canons cell, dependent on Bayham; founded after 1260; dissolved 1280–7 (canons expelled, restored and again expelled); restored 1296 in return for annual payment to Michelham	
Hastings Priory		Augustinian Canons Regular — (?)Arroasian founded 1189–99 by Walter Bricet, or more probably by Walter de Scotney; structure physically moved inland to Warbleton due to encroachment of the sea; dissolved 1413; dissolved 1539; granted to John Baker 1537/8; masonry from the establishment was excavated during the construction of the Ritz Cinema; ESK Warehouse constructed on site	The Priory Church of the Holy Trinity, Hastings
Hooe Grange		Benedictine monks alien house: grange, dependent on Bec-Hellouin founded 1106; dissolved before 1230	
Langney Priory		Cluniac monks grange, dependent on Lewes founded before 1121; now a house	’'Langney Grange'’
Lewes Greyfriars		Franciscan Friars Minor, Conventual (under the Custody of London) founded before 1241; dissolved 1538	
Lewes Priory		Cluniac monks alien house: dependent on Cluny; founded 1077 (1078–81) by Earl William de Warenna (Warenne) and his wife Gundreda who granted the church of St Pancras; became denizen: independent from 1351; dissolved 16 November 1537; granted to Richard Baker and Richard Sackville 1559/60	
Michelham Priory ^		Augustinian Canons Regular — (?)Arroasian founded 1229 by Gilbert de Aquila (L'Aigle); dissolved 1536; granted to William Earl of Arundel 1541/2; remains incorporated into a mansion; now in ownership of Sussex Archaeological Society	The Priory Church of the Holy Trinity, Michelham
Otham Abbey, Polegate		Premonstratensian Canons — from Durford(?), Sussex founded c.1180 (1175, 1180-3(?)), or between 1180 and c.1187 (probably before 1183 if colonized from Durford) by Ralph de Dene; united with Bayham 1208-11; transferred to Bayham and retained as grange and chapel from 1250; dissolved 1526; now Otteham Court and St Lawrence's Chapel	The Abbey Church of Saint Mary and Saint Laurence
Ramstede Priory		Benedictine nuns founded 1174–84 by Richard, Archbishop of Canterbury dissolved before 1204 by Hubert, Archbishop of Canterbury and nuns removed	St Mary Magdalene ____________________; Ramestede Priory
Robertsbridge Abbey		Cistercian monks daughter house of Boxley, Kent (community founded at Salehurst 29 March 1176); transferred here c.1250; dissolved 16 April 1538; granted to Sir William Sidney 1541/2; site now occupied by a private house without public access	Robert's Bridge Abbey; Pontrobert Abbey; Roberts-bridge Abbey
Rotherfield Priory (?)		doubtful establishment Benedictine monks founded 790(?); alien house: dependent on St-Denys; dubious charter evidencing grant by Bertoald, Duke of the South Saxons; dissolution unknown	
Rye Austin Friars, earlier site		Augustinian Friars (under the Limit of Oxford) founded 1364; destroyed by French marauders 1377; transferred into Rye (see immediately below) 1378–9	
Rye Austin Friars ^{+}		Augustinian Friars (under the Limit of Oxford) (community founded at earlier site (see immediately above) 1364); transferred 1378–9 following destruction of earlier foundation; dissolved 1538; the chapel extant, now called 'The Monastery'	
Rye Friars of the Sack ^		Friars of the Sack founded c.1263; dissolved when order abolished before 1307; subsequently in secular use	
Rye — Friary of St Anthony *		Conventual Franciscan Friars; St Walburga's Church opened 1900; parish in care of Franciscans 1910; St Anthony of Padua church opened 1930	The Friary Church of Saint Anthony of Padua
Salehurst Abbey		Cistercian monks — from Boxley, Kent (Greater London) daughter house of Boxley; founded 29 March 1176 by Alfred de St Martino; transferred to Robertsbridge c.1250	Robertsbridge Abbey (earlier site)
South Malling Monastery		Benedictine? monks founded before 686?; secular collegiate founded before c.770?; dissolved 1547	
Warbleton Priory ^		Augustinian Canons Regular — (?)Arroasian (community founded at Hastings 1189–99); refounded 1413 by Sir John Pelham: transferred from Hastings; dissolved 1536; remains incorporated into Priory Farm, in private ownership without public access	The Priory Church of the Holy Trinity, Hastings ____________________; Rushlake Priory; New Priory of Hastings
Wilmington Priory ^{+}		Benedictine monks alien house: dependent on Grestein; cell founded before 1086 by Robert, Earl of Morteton; priory founded before/c.1243 by Herluin; dissolved 1414; granted to Dean and Chapter of Chichester; granted to Sir Richard Sackville 1565; site now occupied by parochial church	
Winchelsea Black Friars, earlier site		Dominican Friars (under the Visitation of London) founded 1318 on the south cliff; new site granted by the king 1358 due to threat from sea; transferred to new site (see immediately below) 1358	Winchelsey Friary
Winchelsea Blackfriars		Dominican Friars (under the Visitation of London) (community founded at earlier site (see immediately above) 1318); transferred here 1358; dissolved 1538; granted to William Gifford and Michael Wildbore 1544/5	The Priory Church of the Blessed Virgin Mary, Winchelsea ____________________; Winchelsey Friary
Winchelsea Greyfriars, New Town		Franciscan Friars (under the Custody of London) (community founded at Old Town (see immediately below) before 1242 (before 1253)); transferred here 1283-7; dissolved 1538	
Winchelsea Greyfriars, Old Town		Franciscan Friars (under the Custody of London) founded before 1242 (before 1253); transferred to new site (see immediately above) 1283–7	
Withyham Priory		Benedictine monks alien house: grange(?) dependent on Mortain and Marmoutier; land apparently granted by Robert, Count of Mortain before 1086; founded 1249; dissolved 1413; granted to the New College, Hastings (Warbleton); dissolved 1536; granted to King's College, Cambridge	

Return to top of page

==== West Sussex ====
(For references and location detail see List of monastic houses in West Sussex)

Foundation	Image	Communities & provenance	Formal name or dedication & alternative names
Aldingbourne Monastery		grant 692 for monastery and church by King Nothhelm to his sister; endowment transferred to St Wilfrid	
Arundel Blackfriars		Dominican Friars (under the Visitation of London) founded before 1253; dissolved 1538	Arundel Blackfriars
Arundel Priory, earlier site ^{~}		Benedictine monks alien house: dependent on Séez; land granted to Séez by Roger de Montgomery, Earl of Shrewsbury and Sussex before 1094; monastery established 1102; transferred to site of secular canons (see immediately below) 1177	
Arundel Priory		secular canons founded before 1177; Benedictine monks (community founded at earlier site (see immediately above) 1094); transferred from earlier site 1177, replacing secular canons; alien house: dependent on Séez; monks withdrawn by 1379 secular college 1380 dissolved 1544; remains of the collegiate buildings of the Holy Trinity incorporated into St Winifred's Priory, a 19th-century convent of Servite Nuns which currently occupies the site	The Parish and Priory Church of Saint Nicholas, Arundel
Atherington Priory		Benedictine monks cell or grange dependent on Séez; founded before 1102(?) dissolved c.1414; granted to Syon after 1414; only chapel remains on site, subsequently in use as sanctuary for the ashes of the Moynes family; reproduction medieval-style structures built on site	
Bosham Monastery		monks founded before 681 by Dicul, Irish monk; became a possession of Osbern, chaplain to Edward the Confessor secular canons — from Plympton collegiate founded c.1121; dissolved c.1553	
Boxgrove Priory ^{+}		secular college before 1066; Benedictine monks alien house: dependent on Lessay founded c.1117 by Robert de la Haye (Haya), Lord of Halnaker; became denizen: independent from after 1339; dissolved 1536; granted to Henry, Earl of Arundel 1560/1; part of church now in parochial use	The Priory Church of Saint Mary the Virgin and Saint Blaise, Boxgrove ____________________; Boxgrave Priory
Calcetto Priory, Lyminster		Augustinian Canons Regular founded before 1151 (c.1150) by Queen Adelisa, widow of Henry I; dissolved 1525; suppressed by Cardinal Wolsey; granted to Antony Lord Monage 1607/8; remains incorporated into a farmhouse called 'Calcetto'	The Priory Church of Saint Bartholemew, Pynham The Priory Church of Saint Bartholemew and Saint Thomas of Canterbury, Pynham ____________________; Pynham Priory; Pyneham Priory; Priory de Calceto (Priory of the Causeway)
Chichester Austin Friars		Augustinian Friars former house of the Franscicans, conditionally granted to the Augustinians 1269, but never implemented (see Chichester Greyfriars, earlier site)	
Chichester Blackfriars		Dominican Friars founded before 1280; dissolved 1538; granted to the Mayor and citizens of Chichester 1540/1	
Chichester Greyfriars, earlier site		Franciscan Friars Minor, Conventual (under the Custody of London) founded before 1232; transferred to new site (see immediately below) 1269; site conditionally granted to the Augustinian Friars (see Chichester Austin Friars), but was deemed too close to the Franciscans' new site; granted to St Mary's Hospital 1285; site now occupied by St Mary's Hospital, established here 1269–90, infirmary cubicles converted into apartments	
Chichester Greyfriars		Franciscan Friars Minor, Conventual (under the Custody of London) (community founded at earlier site (see immediately above) before 1232); transferred here 1269; dissolved 8 October 1538; chancel, now located in Priory Park, currently in use as part of the City Museum	
Chichester Priory		secular (collegiate) founded before 956(?), monastery implied from charter by King Edwy, 956; Benedictine? nuns refounded before 1066; nuns removed for canons 1075 when see removed from Selsey to Chichester;	St Nicholas
Crawley Friary *		Capuchin Franciscan Friars founded 1861; extant	SS Francis and Anthony
Crawley Down Monastery *		Community of the Servants of the Will of God (Anglican); extant	The Monastery of the Holy Trinity, Crawley Down, Crawley
Dureford Abbey ^		Premonstratensian Canons - from Welbeck, Nottinghamshire daughter house of Welbeck; founded before 1183 (or 1169, or by 1161) by Henry Husey (Hosat) II, confirmation probably granted March 1161; dissolved 1534–6; granted to Sir William Fitz Williams 1537/8; fragmentary remains incorporated into farmhouse and stable block	The Abbey Church of the Blessed Virgin Mary and Saint John the Baptist, Dureford ____________________; Durford Abbey
Easebourne Priory ^^{+}		Benedictine nuns founded c.1238 purportedly by Sir John de Bohun of Midhurst; Augustinian Canonesses refounded(?) 15th century; dissolved 1536; granted to Sir William FitzWilliam 1536/7; claustral remains incorporated into house; restored frater now in parochial use	St Mary the Nativity of the Blessed Virgin Mary (early 16th century)
Farnham Minster		land granted by King Caedwalla for a minster 688; no evidence establishment was founded	
Ferring Monastery (?)		possible Saxon church/chapel or monastery (?) 757-96 (in the reign of Offa)	
Hardham Priory ^		Augustinian Canons Regular founded after 1248(?); dissolved 1534; site currently occupied by farmhouse and garden	St Cross
Priory of Our Lady of Good Counsel (Sayers Common) *		Canonesses Regular of Windesheim; extant	The Priory Church of Our Lady of Good Counsel
Lyminster Priory		possible Saxon royal minster (Nonnaminstre); Benedictine nuns or canonesses alien house: cell dependent on Almeneches; founded c.1082(?) by Roger de Montgomery, Earl of Sussex, who granted land to St Peter's Abbey, Almenesches; (now The Parish Church of St Mary Magdalene) dissolved c.1414	St Mary ____________________; Nonnaminstre?
Poling Preceptory		Knights Hospitaller founded before 1199(?): land granted by Ralph fitz Savarac, Gergaga de Palinges and his son, confirmed by King John; last prior died 1442; dissolved 1445: became part of the holding of the Prior of England 1445	St John's Priory
Runcton Priory		Benedictine monks founded before 1086; alien house: cell dependent on Troarn: manor granted to Troarn by Roger de Montgomery, Earl of Shrewsbury after 1100(?); dissolved 1260: made over to Bruton, Somerset	
Rusper Priory		Benedictine nuns founded before 1200, probably by a member of the de Braose family: William de Braose was a patron when confirmation granted by Seffrid, Bishop of Chichester; dissolved 1537; granted to Sir Robert Southwell 1537/8; site currently occupied by a house	The Priory Church of Saint Mary Magdalene, Rusper ____________________; Ruspur Priory
Saddlescombe Preceptory		Knights Templar founded c.1228: manor granted by Geoffrey de Say; dissolved 1308–12; Knights Hospitaller c.1308-12 (in retention of the Earl of Surrey until 1397) possibly merely a camera of Shipley after the suppression of the Knights Templar; extant house named 'Saddlescombe Manor' possibly occupies site	
Sele Priory		secular canons collegiate church founded before 1073 by William de Braose (Braiosa); Benedictine monks alien house: dependent on St-Florent-de-Saumur: granted to St-Florent 1080 by William de Braose; founded before 1126; became denizen: independent from 1396; granted to Magdalen College, Oxford 1459: permission obtained by William Waynflete, Bishop of Winchester; dissolved 1480; buildings occupied by Carmelite Friars (see immediately below) 1493	St Peter; ____________________; Beeding Priory
Sele Whitefriars		Carmelite Friars - from Shoreham founded 1493: Carmelites occupied the vacant buildings of the Benedictines (see immediately above); dissolved 1538; remains probably incorporated into vicarage built on site 1792	SS Peter and Paul
Selsey Abbey		Benedictine? monks founded after c.681 by St Wilfrid; episcopal-abbatial diocesan cathedral 709; secular episcopal diocesan cathedral after c.750; see and community transferred to Chichester c.1075; precise location of abbey not known, possibly Church Norton, or submerged by the sea	Selsey Cathedral
Shipley Preceptory		Knights Templar founded c.1128(?): manor and church granted by Philip de Harcourt c.1125 (possibly) or (probably) c.1128; dissolved 1308-12 manor passed to Knights Hospitaller	
Shoreham Camera (?)		Knights Templar manor or camera	
Shoreham Monastery		uncertain order and foundation church granted to St-Florent-de-Saumur 1075–6; rebuilt by the monks of Sele; referred to as collegiate	
Shoreham Whitefriars		Carmelite Friars founded before 1317; dissolved 1493: transferred to Sele; land granted by Sir John de Mowbray in 1348 for the foundation to be extended to the north due to the threat of incursion by the sea; "The Marlipins" have been suggested as the extant remains of the friary	New Shoreham Friary
Shulbrede Priory		Augustinian Canons Regular founded c.1200 by Ralph de Arden; dissolved 1536; granted to Antony Brown 1544/5; site now occupied by private house with limited public access	Wolinchmere Priory; Shulbred Priory
Sompting Preceptory		church associated with Knights Hospitaller priory mentioned 1425/6	Sompting Priory
Steyning Priory		secular collegiate founded before 858?; Benedictine monks (purportedly); alien house(?): cell of Fécamp(?) refounded(?) c.1042 (or in the reign of William the Conqueror); evidence of Benedictine foundation lacking; continuing in collegiate use until 1283–90; 12th-century church possibly built on site of Saxon minster; ruinous by 1577-8 rebuilt and refurbished; in parochial use as the Parish Church of St Andrew	
St Joseph's Abbey, Storrington ^		rectory built 1871–2; Dominican convent and boarding school 1953; school closed 1999	
Storrington Priory *		Premonstratensian Canons Regular; Henry Fitzalan-Howard, 15th Duke of Norfolk invited canons to build a monastic house c.1882; foundation stone laid 1902 by Cardinal Bourne, Bishop of Southwark; extant	Our Lady of England Priory, Storrington
Tortington Priory ^, Storrington		Augustinian Canons Regular founded c.1180 (or in the reign of King John), possibly by Lady Hadwissa Corbet; dissolved 1536; granted to Sir John Spencer 1599/1600; remains incorporated into a barn on a farmyard	The Priory Church of Saint Mary Magdalene, Tortington
Warminghurst Grange		Benedictine monks alien house: grange dependent on Fécamp founded c.1085; dissolved 1414	
Worth Abbey * Turners Hill, Crawley		Benedictine monks from Downside; Somerset; priory founded 1933; raised to abbey status 1957; extant	The Abbey of Our Lady, Help of Christians
Worth Minster (?)		possible minster; Saxon church, possibly from before c.1050, size and layout suggests an establishment with more than a parochial function; Parish Church of St Nicholas on site	
Wythering Monastery (?)		evidence from possibly spurious charters of 680 and 685 referring to lands owned by Selsey monastery, including St Andrew's Church on the East side of 'uedringmutha' (Wittering Haven, later called Pagham Harbour) implying a community at Wythering (Pagham) rather than West Wittering, as previously inferred	Pagham Monastery; Wittering Monastery

Return to top of page

=== Tyne and Wear ===
(For references and location detail see List of monastic houses in Tyne and Wear)

Foundation	Image	Communities & provenance	Formal name or dedication & alternative names
Jarrow Priory ^{+}		Benedictine monks founded 681/2 by St Benedict Biscop and King Egfrid; raided by the Danes 794; destroyed in raids by the Danes c.867; destroyed by fire and abandoned 870; destroyed again? 973; destroyed by William the Conqueror 1069; Benedictine monks (community founded at Newcastle-upon-Tyne c.1073) restored/refounded 1074 (1072): transferred from Newcastle-upon-Tyne 1074; cell dependent on Durham, County Durham 1083; granted to Durham by Bishop William; dissolved 1536; granted to William, Lord Eure; remains partly demolished late-18th century; nave of St Paul's Church built on foundations of main Saxon monastery church; demolished 1782; part of church now in parochial use (EH)	The Priory Church of Saint Paul, Jarrow ____________________; St Paul's Monastery; Jarrow Monastery; St Paul's Priory; Priory of St Paul; St Paul's Monastery
Jarrow Friary?		Dominican Friars possible ref. to Yarm Friary, North Yorks	possibly Yarm Friary (Jarue Friary)
Newcastle-upon-Tyne Austin Friars		Augustinian Friars (under the Limit of York) founded before 1291 by Lord Ross; dissolved 1539; granted to John, Duke of Northumberland 1551/2; utilised by the Council of the North; in use as a military storehouse until sold 1605 and dismantled; Holy Jesus Hospital, currently in use as a museum, lies within the site of the friary church	
Newcastle-upon-Tyne Blackfriars ^		Dominican Friars (under the Visitation of York) founded c.1239 (or 1260) by Sir Peter and Sir Nicholas Scott; dissolved 1538; granted to the Mayor and burgesses of Newcastle-upon-Tyne 1543/4; surviving cloister buildings later used as company halls and almshouses; restored 1978-81; currently in use as restaurant, workshops and tourist information centre	
Newcastle-upon-Tyne Friars of the Sack		Friars of the Sack founded 1267; dissolved 1307 on the suppression of the order; house granted to the Carmelite Friars (see below)	
Newcastle-upon-Tyne Greyfriars ^{#}		Franciscan Friars Minor, Conventual (under the Custody of Newcastle) founded before 1237; dissolved 1539; Observant Franciscan Friars transferred 1498; dissolved 1534; Franciscan Friars Minor, Conventual; 1534; dissolved	
Newcastle-upon-Tyne Monastery (?)		purported early monastery — evidence lacking	'Castrum vel civitas monachorum' ("Monkchester")
Newcastle-upon-Tyne Priory		Benedictine monks — from Evesham, Worcestershire founded c.1073; transferred to Jarrow 1074	
Newcastle-upon-Tyne — St Bartholomew's Priory		Benedictine nuns founded before 1086; possibly dissolved (re)founded shortly before 1135(?); dissolved 3 January 1540	St Bartholomew
Newcastle-upon-Tyne Trinitarians		Trinitarians founded 1360 by William Wakefield on the former site of Carmelite Friars (see immediately below); dissolved 1539; granted to Richard Gresham and Richard Billingford 1545/6	St Michael; Holy Trinity ____________________; Acton's Hospital
Newcastle-upon-Tyne Whitefriars, earlier site		Carmelite Friars founded before 1262 by Richard I; transferred to the former site of the Friars of the Sack (see immediately below) 1307, when the site was divided by the new town wall; hospital of St Michael founded on the site 1360 (see immediately above)	
Newcastle-upon-Tyne Whitefriars		formerly the house of Friars of the Sack; Carmelite Friars (see above) (community founded at earlier site (see immediately above) 1262); transferred here 1307; granted to Richard Gresham and Richard Billingford 1545/6; remains demolished 1960s	
Tynemouth Priory		Saxon monastery apparently both monks and nuns purportedly founded after 653 (after 627 / after 634) by King Oswald; nuns settled here from various locations during Danish raids; completely destroyed 865-75; apparently restored 10th century; monks transferred to Durham, Durham 1083; Benedictine monks dependent on St Albans, Hertfordshire; repaired and refounded c.1083 (1085) by Robert de Mowbray, Earl of Northumberland, by consent of the King and the Archbishop of Canterbury (EH)	St Mary St Mary and St Oswin
Wearmouth Abbey, Monkwearmouth		Benedictine? monks founded 674, built by St Benedict Biscopius; destroyed in raids by the Danes c.867; destroyed by Malcolm III, King of Scotland 1070; Benedictine monks refounded 1074(1075); priory cell 1083; dissolved 1536; granted to Thomas Whitehead 1545/6	The Abbey Church of Saint Peter, Wearmouth ____________________; Monkswearmouth Abbey; Monkwearmouth Abbey; Wermouth Cell

Return to top of page

=== Warwickshire ===
(For references and location detail see List of monastic houses in Warwickshire)

Foundation	Image	Communities & provenance	Formal name or dedication & alternative names
Alcester Abbey ^{$}		Benedictine monks founded c.1138/1140 by Ralph Pincerna le Boteler; reduced to priory cell dependent on Evesham, Worcestershire 1466; dissolved 1536; granted to William and John Sewester; demolished and quarried for the remodelling of the manor house named 'Beauchamp Court'	The Abbey Church of the Blessed Virgin Mary, Saint Anne, Saint Joseph, Saint John the Baptist and Saint John the Evangelist ____________________; Alencester Abbey
Alvecote Priory		Benedictine monks dependent on Great Malvern; founded 1159: granted to Great Malvern by William Burdet; dissolved 1536; granted to Thomas, Lord Audley and Sir Thomas Pope	St Blase ____________________; Avecote Priory
Arbury Priory		Augustinian Canons Regular — Arroasian founded after 1154 (early in the reign of Henry II) by Ralph de Sudley; Augustinian Canons Regular independent from 1235; dissolved 1534; granted to Charles Brandon, Duke of Suffolk 1538/9; site now occupied by an Elizabethan house named 'Arbury Hall'; in private ownership, used for corporate events	The Blessed Virgin Mary ____________________; Erbury Priory; Erdbury Priory; Ordbury Priory
Atherstone Austin Friars^{+}		Augustinian Friars (under the Limit of Lincoln) founded 1374 by Ralph, Lord Basset of Drayton; dissolved 1538; granted to Henry Cartwright 1543/4; nave of friary church retained for parish, chancel used as a grammar school which discontinued 1863, becoming ruinous; house built on site, demolished; house named 'Atherstone House' built on site late-18th century, extant; nave and aisles rebuilt 1849 and 1888 and chancel restored to the church	Atherston Austin Friars
Atherstone Priory		Benedictine nuns daughter house of St Benedict's, Colwich, Staffordshire; foundations laid May 1859; dissolved 1967: amalgamated with Colwich	St Scholastica
Balsall Preceptory	Historical county location. See entry under the West Midlands		
Bretford Priory		Benedictine nuns cell founded before 1154 (during the reign of Henry II), land granted by Geoffrey de Clinton; appropriated by Kenilworth (during the incumbency of Richard, Abbot of Leicester until c.1167) with the consent of Geoffrey de Clinton; dissolved before 1167	
Cawston Grange		Cistercian monks grange dependent on Pipewell, Northamptonshire; in possession of Turchis of Warwick 1086; founded after 1201: granted to Pipewell by Ingleram Clement and his son William; confirmed 1235; built by the time of Edwin the Confessor; destroyed by fire 1307; rebuilt; dissolved 1538; mansion built 16th century; demolished 1829; farmhouse built on site 19th century	
Coombe Abbey		Cistercian monks — from Waverley, Surrey founded 10 July 1150 by Richard de Camvilla; dissolved 1539; granted to John, Earl of Warwick 1547/8; mansion named 'Combe Abbey House' built on site by 1581 John (afterwards Lord) Harrington; converted into a hotel, with its grounds now the country park of Coombe Country Park in the ownership of Coventry City Council	Combe Abbey
Coventry Greyfriars	Historical county location. See entry under the West Midlands		
Coventry Priory	Historical county location. See entry under the West Midlands		
Coventry — St Anne's Priory	Historical county location. See entry under the West Midlands		
Coventry Whitefriars	Historical county location. See entry under the West Midlands		
Grafton Preceptory		Knights Hospitaller founded c.1189, land granted by Henry de Grafton; dissolved before/c.1476, jointly with Balsall	Temple Grafton; Balsall and Grafton Preceptory
Henwood Priory	Historical county location. See entry under the West Midlands		
Holywell Cell		Augustinian Canons Regular cell dependent on Rocester, Staffordshire; founded 1240–70; dissolved 1325	
Holywell Cell		Cistercian monks 'cella', grange(?) dependent on Stoneleigh; founded before 1291	
Kenilworth Abbey		Augustinian Canons Regular priory founded c.1125 by Geoffrey de Clinton, chamberlain and treasurer to Henry I: licence dated 1125; raised to abbey status after 1439; dissolved 14 April 1539; granted by Henry VIII to Sir Andrew Flamock; masonry used at Kenilworth Castle	The Blessed Virgin Mary
Maxstoke Priory		Sir William de Clinton purchased parish church 1330, initially intending to found a chantry/college; licensed 1331; Augustinian Canons Regular founded 1336/7 by Sir William de Clinton, Earl of Huntingdon; dissolved 1536; granted to Charles, Duke of Suffolk 1538/9; remains incorporated into Priory Farm; now in private ownership; church suffered substantial collapse January 1986	The Holy Trinity, The Blessed Virgin Mary, St Michael and All Saints ____________________; Mackstoke Priory
Merevale Abbey		Cistercian monks — from Bordesley, Worcestershire daughter house of Bordesley; founded 10 October 1148 by Robert de Ferrers II, Earl of Derby; dissolved 13 October 1538; granted to Walter, Lord Ferrers 1540/1; gatehouse chapel now in parochial use	
Monks Kirby Priory		Benedictine monks alien house: dependent on Angers; founded 1077 by Geoffrey de Wirche (Gosfred de Wirchia); granted to Carthusians at Axholme after 1396; restored to Angers 1399; dissolved 1414; again granted to Axholme; granted to Trinity College, Cambridge 1545/6; remains incorporated into St Edith's Church	The Priory Church of Saint Mary and Saint Denis, Kirby ____________________; Kirby Priory
Nuneaton Priory		Fontevrault Benedictine nuns and monks double house — from Kintbury, Berkshire alien house: dependent on Fontevrault; founded c.1155 by Robert Bossu, Earl of Leicester; Benedictine nuns denizen: apparently independent of Fontevrault from after 1442; dissolved 1539; granted to Sir Marmaduke Constable 1540/1; remains incorporated into St Mary's Church, built on site 1876	St Mary the Virgin
Oldbury Priory		Benedictine nuns manor belonged to Polesworth; founded c.1066-70: nuns purportedly transferred from Polesworth upon expulsion by Robert Marmion I; transferred to Polesworth by Robert Marmion II; dissolved c.1130; continued as a cell and chapel until c.1272	St Laurence ____________________; St Lawrence's Chapel
Penitanham Monastery(?) ^{~}		land granted by Oshere, King of the Hwicce 693; no further reference nor identification	
Pinley Priory		Cistercian nuns founded before 1135 (during the reign of Henry I) by Robert de Pillarton (Pilardinton); also given as Benedictine nuns dissolved 1536; granted to William Wigstone, Esq. 1544/5	St Mary
Polesworth Abbey		Benedictine nuns founded before 839(?) by King Egbert; possibly refounded c.980; purportedly expelled by Robert Marmion I and transferred to Oldbury 1066–70; transferred from Oldbury c.1130 by Robert Marmion II and his wife Milicent; dissolved 31 January 1539; granted to Francis Goodyere, Esq. 1544/5; conventual church in parochial use as the Parish Church of St Editha	St Editha ____________________; Pollesworth Abbey
Shuttington Monastery ^{~}		hermit friars, no order given — apparently not Austin Friars founded 1260; no later record; church under Benedictines at Alvecote	
Stoneleigh Abbey		Cistercian monks daughter house of Bordesley, Worcestershire; (community founded at Radmore, Staffordshire 1143-7); transferred from Radmore 19 December 1154, with the consent of Henry II, foundations laid 13 April 1155; dissolved 1536; granted to Charles Brandon, Duke of Suffolk 1538/9; remains incorporated into country house named 'Stoneleigh Abbey House' built on site after 1561, altered 18th & 19th century	Stonely Abbey
Stratford-on-Avon Monastery		Saxon monks apparently founded 693-717 (during the incumbency of Ecgwine, Bishop of Worcester) dissolved after 872	
Studley Priory		Augustinian Canons Regular (community founded at Witton, Worcestershire (West Midlands) c.1135); transferred from Witton by Peter Corbezon c.1151; conventual church rebuilt, consecrated 1309; dissolved 1536; granted to Sir Edmund Knightly; site now occupied by a farmhouse	The Priory Church of Saint Mary, Studley
Thelsford Priory		Augustinian Canons Regular — Holy Sepulchre priory(?) possibly founded after 1170 (1200–1212); Trinitarians refounded c.1214: land granted by Sir William Lucy of Charlecote (William de Cherlecote), or 1224-40(?); dissolved 26 October 1538; granted to William Whorwood, Esq. and William Walter 1543/4	St John the Baptist and St Radegund ____________________; Thelesford Priory
Warmington Priory		Benedictine monks alien house: dependent on St-Pierre, Préaux; founded before 1123 by Paul de Prattelles, granted by Henry de Newburgh, Earl of Warwick; dissolved c.1387(?); under Toft Monks, Norfolk by 1380; dissolved 1387; granted to the Carthusians at Witham, Somerset 1428; granted to William and Francis Seldon Esqrs. 1543/4	
Warwick Blackfriars ^{#}		Dominican Friars (under the Limit of Oxford) founded before 1263, site obtained for the friars by Ralph Boteler, Baron of Wem; dissolved 20 October 1538	
Warwick Monastery		Saxon monks destroyed 1016 by Cnut	
Warwick Nunnery		Saxon nuns purportedly destroyed c.1016 by Cnut; subsequently site of "St Nicholas's churchyard"	
Warwick St Sepulchre Priory		Augustinian Canons Regular — Holy Sepulchre founded c.1119-23, begun by Henry Newburgh (Henry de Beaumont) probably before 20 June 1119, completed by his son Earl Roger 1123; indistinguishable from mainstream Augustinian Canons Regular after 1188; independent from after 1280 (recorded as Holy Sepulchre Canons 1280); dissolved 1536; granted to Thomas Hawkins 1546/7; remains incorporated into mansion built on site 1556, largely dismantled 1925 and removed to Virginia	
Warwick Preceptory ^{#}		Knights Templar founded c.1135 (between 1123 and 1142) purportedly by Roger, Earl of Warwick; possibly superseded as preceptory by Balsall, becoming a member thereof c.1142; dissolved 1308–12; passed to Knights Hospitaller who maintained there a chaplain, bailiff and pensioner	
Wolston Priory		Benedictine monks alien house: dependent on St-Pierre-sur-Dives; founded 1086-94: chapel and other endowments granted by Hubert Boldran dissolved 1394; sold to Carthusians at Coventry;	
Wootton Wawen Priory		Saxon minster land granted by King Ethelbald of Mercia between 723 and 737; no further reference to that establishment; Benedictine monks alien house: dependent on Conches; founded after 1086: church and other endowments granted by Robert de Tony soon after the Norman Conquest; granted to the Carthusians at Coventry 1398; restored to Conches 1400; dissolved 1447; granted to King's College, Cambridge	
Wroxall Priory		Benedictine nuns founded c.1135(?) (1141?) by Hugh, Lord of Hatton and Wroxall; dissolved 1536; granted to Robert Burgoin and John Scudamore 1544; some claustral buildings demolished and house built on site 16th century by Burgoyne family; site sold to James Dugdale 1861; more claustral buildings demolished 1864; house named 'Wroxall Abbey' built on site 1866, in use as a school; school closed 1995 and reopened as a hotel; St Leonard's church closed 1995(?) and reopened as a chapel known as 'Wren's Chapel' for an independent Christian church	St Leonard ____________________; Wroxhall Priory

Return to top of page

=== West Midlands ===
(For references and location detail see List of monastic houses in the West Midlands)

Foundation	Image	Communities & provenance	Formal name or dedication & alternative names
Balsall Preceptory	^{+}	Knights Templar founded 1146 (c.1142) (during the reign of King Stephen) by Roger Mowbray; preceptory before 1226; dissolved 1308–12; Knights Hospitaller 1322; dissolved 1470, jointly with Grafton; granted to Sir Robert Dudley 1565/6; became part of the holdings of the prior of the order in England 1476; became ruinous; restored 1622; in use as chapel for the local almshouse 1677; church became parochial 1863; now under trusteeship of The Foundation of Lady Katherine Leveson, with public access by arrangement	church: The Church of Saint Mary the Virgin ____________________; Temple Balsall; Balsall and Grafton Preceptory; Balshall Preceptory
Coventry Greyfriars		Franciscan Friars Minor, Conventual (under the Custody of Worcester) founded before 1234 by Ralph, Earl of Chester; dissolved 5 October 1538; granted to the Mayor and bailiffs of Coventry 1542/3	
Coventry — St Anne's Priory ^		Carthusian monks — from London Charterhouse, Middlesex and Beauvale founded 1381 by William, Lord Zouch, of Harrington; dissolved 16 January 1539; granted to Richard Andrews and Leonard Chamberlain 1542/3	The Priory Church of Saint Anne, Coventry
Coventry — St Mary's Priory		purported Saxon nunnery destroyed by in raids by the Danes 1016; Benedictine monks founded 1043(?) by Leofric, Earl of Mercia and his wife Lady Godiva: papal confirmation 1043; abbatial-episcopal diocesan cathedral priory founded 1102: see transferred from Chester; dissolved 15 January 1539: see transferred to Lichfield	The Priory Church of Saint Mary, Saint Peter and Saint Osburg, Coventry
Coventry Whitefriars		Carmelite Friars friary proposed 1287, forbidden; founded 1342, built by Sir John Poultney, citizen of London and five times Lord Mayor; dissolved 1 October 1538; granted to Ralph Sadler 1544/5	St Mary
Dudley Priory		Cluniac monks alien house: dependent on Wenlock Priory, Shropshire; founded 1149-60 by Gervase Pagnell (Painell), carrying out the intentions of his father Ralph, lord of the manor; became denizen: independent from 1395; dissolved 1539; granted to Sir John Dudley 1540/1;site now located in public Priory Park	The Priory Church of Saint James, Dudley
Halesowen Abbey		Premonstratensian Canons — from Welbeck, Nottinghamshire founded 1218 by Peter des Roches, Bishop of Winchester, (charter 1215), manor granted by King John 1214, canons arrived 1218; dissolved 9 June 1538; remains of abbey church and cloister in use as barn on Manor Abbey Farm; (EH)	The Abbey Church of the Blessed Virgin Mary and Saint John the Evangelist, Halesowen
Henwood Priory ^{#}		Benedictine nuns founded 1154-9 (during the reign of Henry II, under Walter Durdent, Bishop of Chester (Coventry)) by Ketelberne (Katelbern) de Langdon; dissolved 1536; granted to John Higford 1539/40	The Priory Church of Saint Margaret, Henwood ____________________; Heanwood Priory
Sandwell Priory		hermitage before 1180; Benedictine monks founded c.1190 (c.1180) by William, son of Guy de Offney; dissolved 1524 (7 June 1525)	The Priory Church of Saint Mary Magdalene, Sandwell
Wolverhampton Carmelite Monastery *		Carmelite nuns extant	
Wolverhampton Monastery (?) ^{+}		Saxon monks founded 659? traditionally by Wulfhere, King of Mercia; possibly refounded 994 by Lady Wulfran, land granted to Wulfgeat, kinsman of Lady Wulfran, by King Edgar, confirmed by Sigeric, Archbishop of Canterbury; secular collegiate founded c.994 possibly on the site of earlier monastery; dissolved 1538; restored 1852-65 by Ewen Christian	St Mary St Peter

Return to top of page

=== Wiltshire ===
(For references and location detail see List of monastic houses in Wiltshire)

Foundation	Image	Communities & provenance	Formal name or dedication & alternative names
Amesbury Abbey		tradition of early monastery destroyed 6th century; Benedictine nuns abbey founded c.979 by Alfrida, widow of King Edwin; Fontevrault Benedictine nuns alien house: dependent on Fontevrault; refounded 1177; Henry II obtained papal consent, abbess pensioned and nuns apparently expelled to other houses 1177, being replaced by nuns from Fontevrault and Westwood; Fontevrault Benedictine nuns and brothers double house priors recorded from 1194; became denizen: independent from sometime after 1403; dissolved 1539; granted to Edward, Earl of Hertford 1540/1; hypothesis that the current parish church was the church of the brethren, possibly built on the site of the early minster	Abbey of St Mary and St Melor (c.979) ____________________; Amesbury Priory
Ansty Preceptory ^^{(?)}		Knights Hospitaller founded c.1220, manor granted by William de Turberville (Tubelville) 1210–1; dissolved 1540; granted to J. Zouch 1546/7; in use as a hospice after dissolution; badly damaged by fire 1927; converted into an engineering workshop; remains possibly incorporated into farmhouse at Manor Farm	
Avebury Priory		Benedictine monks alien house: cell dependent on St-Georges, Bocherville; founded after 1114 by William de Tancarville (Tancervilla); dissolved 1378; granted to Winchester College 1391; granted to Sir William Sharington 1548/9; manor house named Avebury Manor built on site c.1557	
Bradenstoke Priory		Augustinian Canons Regular founded c.1139 (1142) by Walter D'Evereaux; dissolved 17 January 1539; granted to Richard Pexhall 1546/7; remains within farmstead named 'Bradenstoke Abbey'	Clack Priory
Bradford-on-Avon Monastery		Benedictine? monks founded c.705–710 by St Aldhelm, Bishop of Sherborne; granted to Shaftesbury, Dorset 1001; served as charnel house in medieval period; in use as a dwelling and a school 18th to mid-19th century; restored 1870; church now in ownership of the Wiltshire Archaeological Society	St Lawrence
Briontune Priory		Augustinian Canons Regular	St Mary Magdalene ____________________; Brioptune Priory
Britford Monastery (?)		possible Saxon community	
Bromham Monastery		uncertain order and foundation	
Calne Monastery (?)		possible Saxon community	
Charlton Priory		Premonstratensian Canons alien house: dependent on L'Isle-Dieu, Normandy founded c.1187, granted to L'Isle-Dieu by Reginald de Pavely; dissolved 1380; granted to the Hospital of St Katherine-by-the-Tower granted to Sir William Sharington 1548/9	Charleton Priory
Clatford Priory		Benedictine monks alien house: cell dependent on St-Victor-en-Caux; founded after 1104; manors granted by Hugh, son of Ralph de Mortimer; dissolved c.1439; granted to Eton College 1441	Clatford and Hullavington Priory
Corsham Priory ^{+}		possibly late Saxon minster; St Bartholomew's church granted to St-Etienne, Caen by William the Conqueror; Benedictine monks alien house: cell dependent on Marmoutier; founded before 1077, granted to Marmoutier between 1068 and 1135 (during the reign of Henry I); dissolved 1294; administered by the Cluniacs at Tickford, ceasing as a priory, granted to King's College, Cambridge by Henry VI; granted to Syon Abbey by Edward VI; granted to Philip Moore 1608/9; restored by G. E. Street and C. F. Hansom 1875–8	Cosham Priory
Cricklade Monastery (?)		possible Saxon monks or secular community	St Sampson
Damerham Monastery	Historical county location. See entry under Hampshire		
Easton Priory or Hospital, Easton Royal ^{~}		Trinitarian hostel founded 1245 by Stephen of Tisbury, Archdeacon of Salisbury; priory founded 1251, priory church serving as both conventual and parochial; destroyed by fire 1493; apparently restored buildings were reported as in a ruinous state at dissolution; dissolved 1536; granted to Sir Edward Seymour, Viscount Beauchamp 1536; granted to Edward, Earl of Hertford 1608/9; present parish church possibly stands on or near the site of the conventual church	Eston Friary
Edington Priory ^{+}		manor granted to the nuns at Romsey by King Edgar between 959 and 975; present church built as a chantry chapel 1351 by William Edington, Bishop of Winchester on site of earlier church; Bonshommes brothers church granted to the Bonshommes 1358 as their priory church, nave reserved for parochial use; dissolved 1539; granted to William Pawlet, Lord St John 1541/2; conventual church, restored 1881–91, now in parochial use as All Saints' parish church; house named 'The Priory' possibly incorporates remains of the claustral buildings	St Mary, St Catherine and All Saints ____________________; All Saints' Church; Edindon Priory
Fisherton Anger Friary		Dominican Friars (community founded 1245 at Fugglestone); transferred here 1281; dissolved 1538	
Fugglestone Priory		Dominican Friars founded 1245; transferred to Fisherton Anger 1281 and thereafter retained as a cell until dissolution; dissolved 1538; apparently converted to domestic use when recorded early-19th century, when at least partly extant	
Great Bedwyn Monastery (?)		apparent Saxon minster community 10th century, purported traces to the east of present parish church of St Mary, which is possibly on or near site of the Saxon foundation	St Lawrence
Hullavington Grange (?)		Benedictine monks founded 1104; dissolved after 1325	
Ivychurch Priory		Saxon minster apparently established as priory church; Augustinian Canons Regular founded before 1154 by King Stephen; dissolved 1536	The Blessed Virgin Mary
Kington St Michael Priory		Benedictine nuns founded before 1155, probably by the family of Robert Wayfer de Brinton who granted land; dissolved 1536; granted to Sir John Long 1538/9; site now within farm	The Priory Church of St Mary, Kington St Michael ____________________; Keinton Priory
Lacock Abbey		Augustinian Canonesses priory founded 1230-2 by Ela, Countess of Salisbury, widow of William Longspée, confirmed 1320; raised to abbey status 1239–40 dissolved 21 January 1539; granted to Sir William Sharington 1540/1; (NT)	The Abbey Church of the Blessed Virgin Mary and Saint Bernard, Lacock
Longleat Priory		Augustinian Canons Regular founded before 1233 dissolved 1529; granted to Sir John Thynne 1540/1; country house named 'Longleat House' built on site	
Loxwell Abbey ^{#}		Cistercian monks dependent on Quarr, Isle of Wight founded 1151 by Empress Matilda, her son Henry and her chamberlain Drogo; dissolved 1154; transferred to Stanley	
Maiden Bradley Priory		originally a Lazer House founded 1152 (before 1164) by Manasser Biset; hospital for leper women in the care of secular brothers and priests; Augustinian Canons Regular founded 1184: granted by Bishop Hubert 1183–93; priory founded before 1201; dissolved 1536; granted to Sir Edward Seymore 1537/8	The Hospital and Priory Church of the Blessed Virgin Mary and Saint Lazarus, Maiden Bradley ____________________; Mayden Bradeley Priory
Malmesbury Abbey		British nuns (legendary) purportedly founded before 603 (7th century); dissolved by St Austin, Archbishop, in, or before, 604; hermitage of Irish monk and hermit Mailduib possibly 637; succeeded by St Aldhelm who built larger church of Our Saviour, SS Peter and Paul after 675; Benedictine? monks founded c.675; secular canons collegiate founded after 796; Benedictine monks founded before 965(−74) (675); destroyed in raids by the Danes 1010; soon rebuilt; refounded before 1143 by William of Malmesbury; dissolved 15 December 1539; granted to William Stump 1544/5; church now in parochial use	Our Saviour, Saint Peter and Saint Paul, Malmesbury (after 675) St Mary, Virgin (before 1143)
Marlborough Priory		Gilbertine canons founded before 1189(?) possibly by Henry II; plundered and partly destroyed by fire 1337 dissolved January 1539; granted to Anthony Stringer;	The Priory Church of Saint Margaret, Marlborough ____________________; Marleburgh Abbey
Marlborough Whitefriars		Carmelite Friars founded c.1316 by John Godwin and William Ramesbesch (Rammeshulle): licence granted 1 January 1316 for William de Rammeshulle to grant land; dilapidated at time of suppression; dissolved 1538; granted to John Pye and Robert Brown 1542/3; demolished 1820; fragments purportedly used in a house named 'the Priory'	Marleburgh Whitefriars
Monkton Farleigh Priory		Cluniac monks alien house: dependent on Lewes, Sussex; projected by Humphrey de Bohun, probably founded 1120–1123 by his son Humphrey III and wife Maud, confirmed by Hugh, Prior of Lewes; became denizen: independent from sometime during 1373–4; dissolved 1536; granted to Sir Edward Seymore 1536/7; remains incorporated into house built on site 16th century	St Mary Magdalene ____________________; Farleigh Priory
Netheravon Monastery (?)		documentary and physical suggestion of pre-Conquest monastic community	
Ogbourne Priory		Benedictine monks alien house: dependent on Bec-Hellouin; founded 1149 (before 1147), granted to Bec by Matilda de Wallingford with the assent of Henry, Duke of the Normans, and his mother Empress Matilda; granted to the Duke of Bedford 1404–5; dissolved 1414; spiritualities transferred to Windsor College 1421; other possessions divided and granted to King's College, Cambridge and Eton College, the London Charterhouse and other establishments	Ogbourne Saint George Priory
Poulton Priory	Former county location. See entry under Gloucestershire		
Rockley Preceptory		Knights Templar founded 1155-6 by John Mareschall; dissolved 1308–12; Knights Hospitaller manor or camera and chapel; dissolved 1541; granted to Sir Thomas Stroude, Walter Erle and John Paget 1544/5	Temple Rockley Preceptory
Salisbury Blackfriars		Dominican Friars (under the Visitation of London) (community founded 1245 at Wilton) transferred here 1281; dissolved 1538; granted to John Pollard and William Byrte 1544/5	
Salisbury Greyfriars		Franciscan Friars Minor, Conventual (under the Custody of London) founded before 1230; dissolved 1538; granted to John Wroth 1544/5	
Stanley Abbey		Cistercian monks (community founded at Loxwell 1151); transferred here 1154 by Henry II; largely rebuilt 13th century; dissolved 1536; granted to Sir Edward Bainton 1536/7	Stanlegh Abbey
Stratton St Margaret Priory (?)		Benedictine monks alien house granted to King's College, Cambridge by Henry VI	
Tisbury Monastery		Saxon Benedictine? monks, possible minster founded before 710; dissolved after 759 land granted to Shaftesbury 984 (983), confirmed by King Ethelred; parish church of St John the Baptist, built 1180–1200, possibly stands on site	
Tisbury Grange		Benedictine nuns grange dependent on Shaftesbury; Place Farm currently occupies the site	
Upavon Priory		land and churches at Upavon and Sheraton held by St-Wandrille 1086; Benedictine monks alien house: cell dependent on St-Wandrille; founded before 1086: land held by Domesday Survey; cell founded by 12th century; dissolved before 1414; granted to Ivychurch 1423; granted to Francis and A. Anderson 1606/7	Uphaven Priory
Wilton Abbey		church of St Mary founded by Weohstan, Ealdorman of Wiltshire; nuns founded c.830 (or 773), according to tradition, by petition of Weohstan's widow, Alburga, to King Egbert, to convert church of St Mary into a nunnery refounded 890; refounded 934; Benedictine nuns refounded before 970; destroyed by Sweyn 1003; rebuilt in stone by Edith, wife of Edward the Confessor, consecrated 1065; dissolved 25 March 1539; granted to Sir William Herbert 1543/4; conventual church and buildings demolished; outlying medieval building named 'the Almonry' remains; house named 'Wilton House' built on site.	St Mary and St Bartholomew St Mary, St Bartholomew and St Edith (after 987)
Wilton Blackfriars		Dominican Friars (under the Visitation of London) founded 1245; dissolved 1281: transferred to Salisbury and thereafter probably only a vicarial house until 1538	

Return to top of page

=== Worcestershire ===
(For references and location detail see List of monastic houses in Worcestershire)

Foundation	Image	Communities & provenance	Formal name or dedication & alternative names
Alderminster		Saxon minster	Aldermannestun
Astley Priory		Benedictine monks alien house: dependent on St-Taurin; founded before 1086 by Ralph de Todeni; dissolved 1414; granted to secular college of Westbury-upon-Trym; granted to Sir Ralph Sadler by Henry VIII	The Priory Church of Saint Peter, Astley
Beckford Priory		Saxon minster monks or secular collegiate founded before 803; probably absorbed into Worcester late-9th century; Augustinian Canons Regular alien house: dependent on Ste-Barbe-en-Auge, Normandy founded between 1128 and 1135, granted to Ste-Barbe-en-Auge by Henry I Rabellus, the chamberlain of Normandy; dissolved 1414; lands granted to Eton College 1443; granted to Sir Richard Lee 1547; known as 'The Manor'; mansion named 'Salesian House' (also known as 'Beckford Hall') built on site 17th century; now in use as Roman Catholic College; crypt alone remains of the monastic founded	St Barbara ____________________; Beckford Cell; Beccanford Priory
Blockley Monastery	Former county location. See entry under Gloucestershire		
Bordesley Abbey		Savignac monks — from Garendon, Leicestershire founded 22 November 1138-1147 by Waleran de Beaumont, Count of Meuland and Worcester land apparently granted by Queen Matilda 1136; Cistercian monks orders merged 17 September 1147; dissolved 17 July 1538; now in ownership of Borough of Redditch	
Bredon Monastery ^{~}		Benedictine? monks founded c.717: land granted to Eanulf (grandfather of King Offa) by King Ethelbald before 717; apparently under Worcester by 844; destroyed in raids by the Danes late-9th century; mansion built 17th century allegedly on site	St Peter
Cookhill Priory ^		Cistercian nuns founded c.1180 (before 1198); founded(/rebuilt(?)) purportedly by Isabel, Countess of Warwick; dissolved 1538/9 remains incorporated into farmhouse and chapel 15th century	
Daylesford Monastery	Former county location. See entry under Gloucestershire		
Dodford Priory		Augustinian Canons Regular priory cell founded 1184–6; incorporated into Premonstratensian house at Halesowen 1332; dissolved 1464; Premonstratensian Canons daughter house of Halesowen founded 1464, annexed by Halesowen; dissolved 1538	Blessed Virgin Mary
Droitwich Austin Friars ^{#}		Augustinian Friars (under the Limit of Lincoln) founded 1331, licence granted to Thomas Alleyn to build an oratory; dissolved 1538	
Dudley Priory	Historical county location. See entry under the West Midlands		
Evesham Abbey ^{+}		Benedictine monks founded after/c.701 by St Egwyn, Bishop of Worcester; collegiate 941 to c.970; Benedictine monks restored c.970 to c.975; collegiate c.975 until c.995; Benedictine nuns with regular priests or brethren attached to the abbey from unknown date until after c.1086; Benedictine monks restored c.995 dissolved 17 November 1539 (January 1540); now within a public park	St Mary and St Egwin
Fladbury Monastery ^{#}		land granted to Oftfor, Bishop of Worcester by King Ethelred between 691 and 693; later under Evesham until 714; under Worcester until early-9th century; parochial c.888?; parish church of St John the Baptist built on site	
Great Malvern Priory ^{+}		Benedictine monks cell traditionally founded c.975 by Werstan; hermit settlement? founded before 1066; Benedictine monks founded c.1075 (1085); dependent on Westminster, Middlesex; dissolved 1539–40	The Priory Church of Saint Mary and Saint Michael, Great Malvern ____________________; Malvern Priory; Malvern Major
Halesowen Abbey	Historical county location. See entry under the West Midlands		
Hanbury Monastery		Saxon monastery land granted to Abbot Colman by King Wulfhere (657-674); merged into Worcester c.888?	
Kempsey Monastery		Saxon monastery founded before 799 (?802); under Worcester by 799 (?802); manor granted to the bishop of Worcester 847	
Kidderminster		Saxon minster founded c.735, land granted to Cynebert by Æthelbald, King of Mercia 735; under Worcester by 777; dissolved after 816	Stour-in-Usmere Minster; Stourbridge Monastery
Little Malvern Priory		Benedictine monks dependent on Worcester; founded c.1171 by Jocelin and Edred; dissolved c.1537; site now occupied by house named 'Little Malvern Court'	The Priory Church of Saint Giles, Little Malvern St Egidius ____________________; Malvern Minor Priory
Pershore Abbey ^{+}		secular canons collegiate founded c.689 by Oswald, nephew of Æthelred, King of Mercia; then secular canons and nuns; Benedictine monks founded 972, King Edgar replaced the seculars and nuns with Benedictines c.970, confirmed 972; dissolved 1539 (1539–40); granted to William and Francis Sheldon 1544/5; transepts and choir of conventual church retained for parochial use, continuing as the Parish Church	The Priory Church of Saint Mary the Virgin, Saint Peter and Saint Paul, Pershore The Priory Church of Saint Mary and Saint Eadburga, Pershore parochial portion also dedicated to the Holy Cross
Stanbrook Abbey		Benedictine nuns founded 1838; transferred to Wass, North Yorkshire 2009	The Abbey Church of Our Lady of Consolation, Callow End, Stanbrook
Westwood Priory		Fontefralt Benedictine nuns and brothers — double house alien house: cell dependent on Fontévrault; founded after 1154 (early in the reign of Henry II), land and other endowments granted by Osbert FitzHugh and his mother Eustacia de Say; Benedictine nuns appears to have become a regular Benedictine community after c.1374; became denizen: independent from before 1412(?); dissolved 1553; granted to John Pakinton 1538/9	The Priory Church of the Blessed Virgin Mary, Westwood
Whistones Priory, Barbourne		Cistercian nuns founded 1537-40 (before 1255) by Walter de Cantilupe, Bishop of Worcester; dissolved 1536; granted to Richard Callowhile 1543/4; largely demolished soon after dissolution	The Priory Church of Saint Mary Magdalene, Barbourne ____________________; The White Ladies, Aston; House of Mary Magdalene; White Ladies Nunnery
Witton Priory ^{+(?)} Droitwich		Augustinian Canons Regular founded c.1135 (late in the reign of Henry I or early in the reign of Stephen) by Peter Corbezun (later de Studley); transferred to Studley c.1151 by Peter Corbezun; conventual church possibly in parochial use as the Parish Church of St Peter-de-Witton	St Mary the Virgin ____________________; Witton St Peter by Droitwich Priory
Worcester Blackfriars		Dominican Friars (under the Visitation of Oxford) founded 1347 by William Beauchamp, Lord of Emley; dissolved 1538; surrendered to Richard Ingworth, Bishop of Dover; granted to the bailiffs and citizens of Worcester 1539/40	
Worcester Friars of the Sack		Friars of the Sack founded before 1272; dissolved 1284	
Worcester Greyfriars, earlier site		Franciscan Friars Minor, Conventual (under the Custody of Worcester) founded c.1226 transferred to new site (see immediately below) 1236/9	
Worcester Greyfriars		Franciscan Friars Minor, Conventual (under the Custody of Worcester) (community founded at earlier site (see immediately above) c.1226) transferred here 1236/9 by Charles of Warwick; dissolved 4 August 1538, surrendered to Richard Ingworth, Bishop of Dover; granted to the bailiffs and citizens of Worcester 1539/40; refectory/great hall in use as a gaol 1782	
Worcester Penitent Sisters Friary		Penitent Sisters founded before 1240–1, oaks granted by Henry III; dissolution unknown	
Worcester Trinitarians?		Trinitarians no evidence for Trinitarians in Worcester	
Worcester Cathedral Priory ^{+}		Benedictine? monks and Benedictine? nuns founded before 743, received a grant from Æthelbald, King of Mercia; secular canons collegiate 9th century; Benedictine monks founded 969; monastic and episcopal diocesan cathedral built 983 by St Oswald; see transferred from St Peter's (see immediately below); dissolved 18 January 1540, monks expelled, replaced by secular canons; episcopal diocesan cathedral founded 1540; extant	The Cathedral and Priory Church of Saint Mary, Worcester The Cathedral and Priory Church of Saint Mary, Saint Peter, Saint Oswald and Saint Wulfstan (1218) The Cathedral Church of Christ and the Blessed Mary the Virgin of Worcester
Worcester Cathedral St Peter's Priory		Benedictine? monks and secular canons monastic and episcopal diocesan cathedral founded 680; secular canons 9th century to 969; see transferred to St Mary's (see immediately above) 969; Benedictine monks refounded 974–7	

Return to top of page

=== East Riding of Yorkshire ===
Foundation	Image	Communities and provenance	Formal name or dedication and alternative names
Beverley Minster ^{+}		Benedictine? monks and nuns, secular collegiate founded c.700 by John, Archbishop of York; destroyed in raids by the Danes c.867 secular (collegiate) refounded c.934; dissolved 1547; granted to Michael Stanhope and John Bellew 1548/9	The Parish Church of Saint John and Saint Martin, Beverley
Beverley Blackfriars		Dominican Friars (under the Visitation of York) founded 1267 (or before 1240), purportedly by Stephen Goldsmith, but claimed by the town and the Crown; dissolved 1539; granted to John Pope and Antony Foster 1544/5	
Beverley Greyfriars, earlier site		Franciscan Friars Minor, Conventual (under the Custody of York) initially founded before 1267 possibly by John de Hightmede; transferred to new site (see immediately below) 1297	
Beverley Greyfriars		Franciscan Friars Minor, Conventual (under the Custody of York) (community founded at earlier site (see immediately above) before 1267); transferred here 1297 by William Liketon and Henry Weighton; dissolved 1539; granted to Thomas Culpeper 1541/2	
Beverley Preceptory		Knights Hospitaller founded c.1201, manor of the Holy Trinity and other endowments granted by Sybilla de Valoniis; dissolved 1540; granted to William Berkeley 1544/5	
Bridlington Priory ^{+}		Augustinian Canons Regular founded before 1113–4 by Walter de Gant; dissolved 1537; conventual church now in parochial use	The Priory Church of Saint Mary the Virgin, Bridlington ____________________; Burlington Priory
Birstall Priory		Benedictine monks alien house: dependent on Aumale founded after 1115, endowments granted by Stephen, Count of Albemarle; dissolved 1395, sold to Kirkstall; submerged under the Humber Estuary after 1540	Birstall Priory
Cottingham Priory		Augustinian Canons Regular — (?)Arroasian founded 1322 by Thomas Wake, Lord of Liddell, licensed 1320; transferred to Haltemprice 1325–6	
Ellerton Priory (Spalding Moor) ^{$}		Gilbertine Canons priory and hospital founded before c.1209 (1212) by William Fitz Peter; dissolved 18 December 1538; granted to John Aske 1541/2	St Mary ____________________; Elreton on the Derwent Priory; Ellerton Priory
Faxfleet Preceptory		Knights Templar founded 1185 (before 1220(?)); dissolved 1308–12; site now occupied by a fortified manor house	
Haltemprice Priory		Augustinian Canons Regular — (?)Arroasian (community founded at Cottingham 1322) transferred here 1325–6 (1327); church and buildings built and occupied by Arroasian canons from Bourne, Lincolnshire by January 1326; Augustinian Canons Regular independent from before 1355 transferred here 1327; dissolved 12 August 1536 (1536–7); granted to Thomas Culpeper 1540/1	St Mary and the Holy Cross
Hemingbrough Minster		church held by Benedictine monks of Durham Cathedral; licence obtained 1426 to found a secular college; dissolved 1547	St Mary ____________________; Hemingburgh Minster
Howden Minster		secular canons founded 1267 by Robert, Bishop of Durham; dissolved 1550, collegiate	The Collegiate and Minster Church of Saint Peter and Saint Paul, Howden
Kingston upon Hull Austin Friars		Augustinian Friars (under the Limit of York) founded before 1303 (1304); dissolved 1539; extant remains demolished c.1796; remains incorporated into the Tiger Inn; some remains incorporated into Guildhall, demolished 1806	
Kingston upon Hull Blackfriars(?)		Dominican Friars granted to John Broxholme 1544/5 possible error — confusion for Lincoln Blackfriars? (see entry under Lincolnshire)	
Kingston upon Hull Greyfriars		secular college founded by Edward I; Franciscan Friars Minor, Conventual (under the Custody of York(?)) founded after 1307(?); dissolved before 1365; friars removed to found a Franciscan nunnery, which never transpired; Carthusian Priory established 1377	
Kingston upon Hull Whitefriars, earlier site		Carmelite Friars founded 1290–3 transferred to new site (see immediately below) 1307	
Kingston upon Hull Whitefriars		Carmelite Friars (community founded at earlier site (see immediately above) 1290–3); transferred here 1307 when the King granted a new site in exchange for the old; dissolved 1539; granted to John Henneage 1540/1	Kingston Whitefriars
Kingston upon Hull Priory		previously Fransciscan Friary licence granted to Sir William de la Pole to found a hospital, and later an abbey for Franciscan nuns — (never established); Carthusian monks founded 1377; dissolved 1539	St Mary Virgin, St Michael and All Angels, and St Thomas Martyr
Kirkham Priory	Historical county location. See entry under North Yorkshire		
Meaux Abbey		Cistercian monks daughter house of Fountains, Yorkshire; founded 1150 by William of Blois, 'le Gros', Count of Albemarle and Lord of Holderness, site chosen by Adam, monk of Fountains; community arrived 1 January 1151; dissolved 11 December 1539; granted to John, Earl of Warwick 1549/50; site now occupied by Crown Farm, in private ownership	Melsa Abbey
North Ferriby Priory ^{#}		purported Knights Templar preceptory appears not to have existed Augustinian Canons Regular — Order of the Temple of St John of Jerusalem founded c.1140(?) by Eustace fitz John; dissolved 1536–7; granted to Thomas Culpeper c.1540	The Priory Church of St Marie, North Ferriby ____________________; North Ferriby Preceptory (dubious); North Ferry Priory
Nunburnholme Priory		Benedictine nuns founded possibly before 1170 or before 1188 (during the reign of Henry II) by the ancestors of Roger de Merlay, Lord of the Barony of Morpeth, probably William de Merlay or Roger I de Merlay; with regular priests or brethren 12th century until sometime after 1318; dissolved 1536; granted to Robert Tyrwhit	The Priory Church of Saint Mary, Nunburnholme ____________________; Brunnum Priory
Nunkeeling Priory		Benedictine nuns founded 1152 by Agnes de Arches (Agnes de Catfoss); with regular priests or brethren 12th century until sometime after 1318; sometimes given as Cistercian nuns dissolved 1539; granted to Richard Gresham 1540/1; remains incorporated into church of St Mary Magdalene and St Helena built 1810, now ruined	The Priory Church of Saint Mary Magdalene, Keeling ____________________; Nonnekelyng Priory; Nun Kelynge Priory
Ottringham Priory		Cistercian residential chantry dependent on Meaux Abbey; monks from Meaux resided at Ottringham church 1293 to 1323; possibly St Wilfrid's Church	
Snaith Priory ^{+}		Benedictine monks founded after 1101; chapel of St Lawrence granted to Selby by Gerard, Archbishop of York; resident monks from 1310; dissolved 1539	St Lawrence
Swine Priory ^{+}		Cistercian nuns and Premonstratensian(?) canons double house founded before 1153 by Robert de Verli, built c.1180, confirmed by Hugh de Puiset (Pudsey); Premonstratensian(?) replaced by Trinitarian(?) between 1287 and 1290; Cistercian nuns became ordinary nunnery after 1335; dissolved 9 September 1539; granted to Sir Richard Gresham c.1540; conventual church now in parochial use	St Mary ____________________; Swinhey Priory
Thicket Priory	Historical county location. See entry under North Yorkshire		
Warter Priory		Augustinian Canons Regular — Arroasian alien house: daughter house of Arrouaise; abbey founded 1132 by Jeffery (Geoffrey) Fitz Pain Trusbut; became denizen: independent from 1162; priory before 1181–92 to dissolution; dissolved 1536; granted to Thomas, Earl of Rutland c.1540 conventual church remained in parochial use until demolished 1864; parochial church of St James built on site	St James
Watton Priory		Benedictine? nuns founded c.686; probably destroyed in raids by the Danes 9th century; Gilbertine Canons and nuns double monastery founded 1150; dissolved 1539; granted to John, Earl of Warwick; house named 'Watton Abbey' built on site, in private ownership	Walton Priory
Wilberfoss Priory		Benedictine nuns founded c.1154 (before 1153) by Alan de Cotton, who granted land and property, and Jordan fitz Gilbert, who granted church etc. (which was confirmed by Henry, Archbishop of York); dissolved 1539; granted to George Gale c.1543; current parish church possibly the nave of the conventual church	The Priory Church of the Blessed Virgin Mary, Wilberfoss ____________________; Wilburfosse Priory
Withernsea Priory		Benedictine monks alien house: cell dependent on Aumale; founded c.1115, church, etc. granted by Stephen, Count of Albemarle; destroyed by the sea	
Yedingham Priory	Historical county location. See entry under North Yorkshire		

Return to top of page

=== North Yorkshire ===
Foundation	Image	Communities and provenance	Formal name or dedication and alternative names
Allerton Mauleverer Priory		Benedictine monks cell dependent on York Benedictine Priory; founded after 1100 by Richard Malleverer; alien house: dependent on Marmoutier c.1110; dissolved c.1414; granted to King's College, Cambridge; foundation possibly associated with the 12th century rebuilding of St Martin's parish church	St Martin
Ampleforth Abbey *		Benedictine monks founded 1608; extant	The Abbey Church of Saint Lawrence the Martyr, Ampleforth
Arden Priory ^		Benedictine nuns probably founded before 1147 by Peter de Hoton (Hutton), confirmed by his lord, Roger de Mowbray; with regular priests or brethren from unknown date to after 1306; dissolved August 1536; granted to Thomas Culpeper 1540/1; house named 'Arden Hall' built on site, incorporates monastic remains (a chimney)	St Andrew
Basedale Priory		Cistercian nuns (community founded at Hutton c.1162); transferred from Nunthorpe c.1189: granted land here by Guy de Bovincourt; with regular priests or brethren from before 1197 to after 1239; dissolved 1539; granted to Ralph Bulmer and John Thynde 1544/5	St Mary ____________________; Baysdale Priory; Base Dale Hoton Priory
Begar Priory, near Richmond		Cistercian monks alien house: cell or grange(?) dependent on Bégard; founded between 1216 and 1272 (during the reign of Henry III); dissolved c.1414; granted to Eton College	The Blessed Virgin Mary ____________________; Begare Priory
Bolton Priory ^{+}		Augustinian Canons Regular dependent on Huntingdon (Cambridgeshire); (community founded at Embsay 1120); transferred from Embsay 1154-5 (1151, or 1150-9) with the consent of Alice de Rumilly, patroness; founded 1154; independent from 1194/5; dissolved 29 January 1540; granted to Henry, Earl of Cumberland 1541/2; part of church now in parochial use as the Parish Church of St Mary	The Priory Church of the Blessed Virgin Mary and Saint Cuthbert, Bolton ____________________; Bolton Abbey
Byland Abbey		Cistercian monks (community founded at Hood 1138); transferred from Stocking 30 October 1177; dissolved 1539; granted to William Pykering 1540/1; (EH)	The Abbey Church of Saint Mary, Byland
Copmanthorpe Preceptory ^{$}		Knights Templar founded 1258, manor granted by William Malbys sometime before 1258; dissolved after 1292; amalgamated with Ribstone	The Preceptory of Copmanthorpe with the Castle Mills, York
Coverham Abbey ^		Premonstratensian Canons daughter house of Durford(?), Sussex; (community founded at Swainby before 1188 (c.1187)); transferred from Swainby 1197-1202, built by Ralph Fitz Robert, Lord of Middleham; dissolved 1536; part of abbey guest-house incorporated into a house	The Abbey Church of Saint Mary of Charity, Coverham ____________________; Corham Abbey
Cowton Grange		Cistercian monks grange dependent on Fountains; founded before 1145	
Crayke Monastery		site granted to St Cuthbert by King Egfrith 685; became a monastery no later reference	
Drax Priory ^{$}		Augustinian Canons Regular founded 1130-9 by William Paynel; dissolved 24 August 1535; granted to Sir Marmaduke Constable 1538/9	St Nicholas
Easby Abbey		Premonstratensian Canons — from Newhouse, Lincolnshire founded 1152 (1151) by Roald, Constable of Richmond Castle; dissolved 1536/7; (NT)	The Abbey Church of Saint Agatha, Easby
East Cowton Preceptory		Knights Templar founded c.1142, benefactor Roger Mowbray; dissolved 1308-12; Knights Hospitaller maintained a chaplain here, with no preceptory c.1338	Temple Cowton Preceptory
Egglestone Abbey	Historical county location. See entry under County Durham		
Ellerton Priory		Cistercian nuns founded 1170 (during the reign of Henry II), built by Warnerus Dapifer, Earl of Richmond; dissolved 1538-9 (1537); granted to John Aske 1541/2; became part of the manor of Ellerton; now in private ownership without public access	St Mary ____________________; Priory of Ellerton in Swaledale; Elreton Priory
Embsay Priory		Augustinian Canons Regular dependent on Huntingdon (Cambridgeshire); founded late-1120/early-1121, site and church of the Holy Trinity, Skipton granted to Reginald, prior, by William Meschin and his wife Cecilia de Rumilly; transferred to Bolton 1154-5 (1151, or 1150-9); quarried for use in Embsay Kirk, built c.1780, and a number of outhouses	The Blessed Virgin Mary St Cuthbert St Mary and St Cuthbert
Fors Abbey		Savignac monks daughter house of Byland; founded 1145, land granted by Acharius Fitz Bardolph (Akarius fitz Bardolf); Cistercian monks orders merged 17 September 1147; joined by monks from Stocking 10 March 1150; later boarded at Stocking; transferred to Jervaulx 1156 by Conan, Duc de Bretagne, Earl of Richmond; became an estate of Jervaulx, known as 'Dale Grange'; 13th century window incorporated into outbuilding of Chantry Farm	The Blessed Virgin Mary ____________________ de Caritate
Foukeholme Priory ^{#}		Benedictine nuns founded c.1200(?) (during or before the reign of John) probably by a member of the de Colville family; dissolved after 1349, possibly died out during the Black Death	St Stephen
Foulbridge Preceptory		Knights Templar founded before 1226; dissolved 1308-12; Knights Hospitaller apparently intended to maintain preceptory here; secular bailiff 1338	
Fountains Abbey		Cistercian monks founded 27 December 1132; mentored from Clairvaux; dissolved 26 November 1539; granted to Sir Richard Gresham 1540/1; (NT)	The Blessed Virgin Mary
Gilling Monastery		prior to 1873 considered the site of Ingetlingum monastery, now identified as Collingham: see entry under West Yorkshire	
Gisborough Priory		Augustinian Canons Regular founded 1119 by Robert de Brus; dissolved 1540; granted to Sir Robert Chaloner 1561/2; (EH)	St Mary ____________________; Guisborough Priory; Giseburne Priory
Goathland Cell (?)		hermitage for priests and brothers founded 1109-14; Benedictine monks cell ('quasi-cell') dependent on Whitby; after a few years the brothers were received as monks when they transferred to Whitby; described as a farm called 'Abbot House'	
Grosmont Priory ^{#}		Grandmontine monks alien house: dependent on Grandmont; founded c.1204, site granted by Johanna, daughter of William Fossard; became denizen: independent from c.1394-5; dissolved 1536; granted to Edward Wright 1543/4	St Mary
Hackness Priory ^{+}		Saxon Benedictine? monks and nuns founded before 680 by St Hilda; destroyed in raids by the Danes c.870 Benedictine monks — from Whitby cell founded c.1095 St Peter's church granted to Whitby by William de Percy; community located here briefly in 11th century because of coastal pirate raids; retained as a cell; dissolved 1539; Parish Church of St Peter incorporates Saxon features	St Peter
Handale Priory ^{$}		possibly initially Benedictine nuns (if so, no record of when order changed); Cistercian nuns founded 1133 (1139) by William fitz Richard de Percy of Dunsley; dissolved 1539; granted to Ambrose Beckwith 1543/4	St Mary ____________________; Grendale Priory
Healaugh Park Priory ^		hermitage founded between 1160 and 1184, land granted to Gilbert, monk of Marmoutier by Bertram Haget, confirmed by his son Geoffrey, witnessed by Clement, Abbot of York; Augustinian Canons Regular founded 1218 by Alice, granddaughter of Bertram Haget and wife of Jordan de S Maria; dissolved 1535; granted to James Gage 1539/40; remains incorporated into buildings of Manor House Farm	St John the Evangelist ____________________; Healaugh Priory; Helagh Park Priory
Hood Abbey		hermitage before 1138; Savignac monks — from Furness, Lancashire (Cumbria) via Calder daughter house of Furness; founded 1138, land granted by Roger de Mowbray; transferred to [Old] Byland 1143; Augustinian Canons Regular — from Bridlington, (Yorkshire) temporary establishment whilst new abbey at Newburgh was under construction, 1143-45; became grange of Newburgh; dissolved 1539; farmhouse built on site	The Blessed Virgin Mary
Hutton Priory ^^{(?)}		Cistercian nuns possible priory founded c.1162 by Ralph de Nevill transferred to Nunthorpe c.1167; apparently medieval, possibly monastic remains incorporated into house called 'Home Farmhouse'	The Blessed Virgin Mary
Jervaulx Abbey		Cistercian monks from Fors daughter house of Byland; (community founded as Savignac at Fors 1145); founded here 1156 by Conan, Duc de Bretagne, Duke of Richmond; dissolved 1537; granted to Matthew, Earl of Lenox 1544/5; now in private ownership with public access	The Blessed Virgin Mary ____________________; Joreval Abbey
Keldholme Priory		Cistercian nuns founded before 1135 (during the reign of Henry I) by Robert de Stuteville; convent established by 1142-3; priory founded 1154-66; dissolved August 1535; granted to Ralph, Earl of Westmoreland 1538/9; house built on site before 1695; modern house now on site	St Mary ____________________; Duna Priory; Keldon Priory
Kildale Crutched Friars		Crutched Friars founded before 1310, granted land and chapel; dissolved before 1315: William Greenfield, Archbishop of York, prohibited completion of buildings 1312 and use of chapel 1314-5	
Kirkby Malham Cell ^{+?}		Premonstratensian Canons cell of West Dereham, Norfolk; founded before 1189: church of St James granted to Dereham by Adam fitz Adæ; dissolved 1539; current church of St Michael the Archangel possibly the conventual church	St James
Kirkdale Monastery ^{$(?)}		Saxon monastery traditionally founded before 664 by St Cedd; (previously considered to have been the monastery of Laestingaeu, which is now identified as Lastingham); ruined 'minster' bought by Orm, son of Gamel who rebuilt it between 1055 and 1065 (during the reign of Edward the Confessor and Earl Tosti)	St Gregory
Kirkham Priory		Augustinian Canons Regular founded c.1122 by Walter Espec, Lord of Helmsley; planned after 1154 to convert to Cistercian as a daughter of Rievaulx with remaining Augustinians established in a new house in Linton, never transpired; dissolved 8 December 1539; granted to Henry Knyvet 1540/1; (EH)	Holy Trinity
Knaresborough Priory		Trinitarians founded c.1252: patronised by Richard, King of the Romans; destroyed by the Scots 1318; dissolved 30 December 1538; granted to Francis of Shrewsbury 1553; building called 'The Priory' built on early monastic foundations; remains in the garden of Abbey House	The Holy Trinity and St Robert ____________________; Knaresburgh Priory
Lastingham Abbey ^{+}		monks — from Tilbury, Essex founded after 654 by St Cedd; destroyed in raids by the Danes c.870?; Benedictine monks founded 1078, old monastery granted to Whitby by the King; transferred to St Olave's, York before 1086; conventual church in parochial use from 1228, possibly incorporating remains of Saxon monastic church	St Mary ____________________; Laestingaeu Monastery
Lazenby Grange		secular college or collegiate chapel, (also referred to as a hospital) founded 1290 possibly in the chapel of St John the Baptist; granted as a chantry chapel to Jervaulx 1443 or 1444; rebuilt and used as a grange; dissolved 1537/44: monks expelled: granted to Matthew, Earl of Lennox; subsequently passed through several ownerships until 1646	the Blessed Virgin Mary
Malton Priory ^{+}		Gilbertine Canons founded (c.)1150 (1147-54) by Eustace Fitz-John; dissolved December 1539; granted to Robert Holgate, Bishop of Llandaff 1540/1; part of church now in parochial use as the Parish Church of St Mary; claustral remains incorporated into house named 'Abbey House', built late-17th century	The Priory Church of Saint Mary, Old Malton; Old Malton Priory
Marrick Priory ^		Benedictine nuns founded 1154-8 by Roger de Aske (de Asac), confirmed by Conan, Duc de Bretagne, Earl of Richmond; suggested as being Cistercian at some point; with regular priests or brethren from 12th century to 1252; nave used as conventual church, choir as parochial church; dissolved 17 November 40; granted to John Uvedale 1545/6; conventual remains incorporated into Marrick Priory farmhouse; currently in use as an outdoor education and residential centre	St Mary ____________________; Maryke Priory
Marton Priory ^{$}		Augustinian Canons Regular and Canonesses/Benedictine(?) nuns double house founded between 1141 and 1154 (during the reign of Stephen, or during the reign of Henry II) by Bertram de Bulmer; nuns transferred to Moxby before 1167; Augustinian Canons Regular from 1167; dissolved 1536; granted to the Archbishop of York 1542/3	St Mary Virgin
Middlesbrough Priory		Benedictine monks priory cell dependent on Whitby; founded c.1120-30, church of St Hilda granted to Whitby by Robert de Brus; dissolved before 1537; granted to Thomas Reve 1563/4; parish church of St Hilda built on or near site of the claustral church 1838-40 (fell into disrepair and demolished 1970s)	Middlesburgh Priory
Mount Grace Priory		Carthusian monks founded 1398 by Thomas de Holland, Earl of Kent and Duke of Surrey, licence granted by the King; dissolved 1537; granted to Robert Strangeways 1540/1; (NT)	The Priory Church of the Assumption of the Blessed Virgin Mary and Saint Nicholas of Mount Grace in Ingleby ____________________; Mount Grace Charterhouse
Mount St John Preceptory		Knights Hospitaller founded c.1148, by (?)William Percy II; dissolved 1540; granted to the Archbishop of York 1542/3; current building of Mount St John built on site 1720	
Moxby Priory ^{$}		Benedictine nuns — from Marton founded before 1167 (1158?), land granted by Henry II; Augustinian Canonesses refounded? before 1322; dissolved 1536	St John the Evangelist ____________________; Moxby in Marton Priory
Newburgh Priory		Augustinian Canons Regular — from Bridlington (East Yorkshire) via Hood founded 1142-3 (1150) by Roger de Mowbray, granted the church to canons from Bridlington temporarily established at Hood 1145; dissolved 1538; granted to Margaret Simpson and her son Anthony Bellasis; mansion named 'Newburgh Priory' built on site, open to the public	St Mary
Northallerton Whitefriars		Carmelite Friars founded 1356-7, land granted by Edward III and Thomas Hatfield, Bishop of Durham November 1356, royal licence granted 7 February 1354/5; dissolved 10 December 1538; workhouse built 1857; passed to John Dixon 1858, and subsequently passed to William Thrush Jefferson and Cuthbert Wilson and part worked as a gravel pit mid- to late-19th century; in used as a landing strip 1912-1914; workhouse passed to James O'Malley 1939 and converted to an Emergency Medical Hospital, becoming an RAF Hospital 1945 and a civilian hospital (Friarage Hospital) from 1947	
Nun Appleton Priory ^{#}		Cistercian nuns founded c.1150 by Eustace de Merch and his wife Alice de St Quintin: lands granted to the prior and nuns; with regular priests or brethren to 14th century; dissolved 1539; granted to Robert Darknall 1541/2	St Mary and St John the Evangelist
Nun Monkton Priory ^^{+}		Benedictine nuns founded c.1145 (c.1147, before 1147-53) by William de Arches and his wife Ivetta, confirmed by Henry Murdac, Archbishop of York; dissolved 1536; granted to John, Lord Latimer 1537/8; part of conventual church now in parochial use; site occupied by house built c.1660 for George Payler	The Priory Church of Saint Mary, Nun Monkton
Nunthorpe Priory		Cistercian nuns (community founded at Hutton c.1162); transferred here c.1167; transferred to Basedale c.1189	
Old Byland Abbey		Savignac monks (community founded at Hood 1138); transferred from Hood 1143; transferred to Stocking 1147	
Penhill Preceptory		Knights Templar founded c.1155 (c.1142) by Roger Mowbray; dissolved 1308-12; and passed to the Knights Hospitallers in a ruinous state 1328; site now within Temple Farm	The Chapel of Our Lady and St Catherine ____________________; Temple Dowskar; Temple Dove Skar
Ribston Preceptory ^		Knights Templar founded c.1217 by Robert, Lord Ross; dissolved 1308-12; granted to Knights Hospitallers; Knights Hospitaller dissolved 1529; granted to Charles, Duke of Suffolk 1541/2; country house named 'Ribston Hall' built on site 1674, incorporating monastic chapel, in private ownership; partly demolished c.1980	Ribstone Preceptory; Ribstane Preceptory
Richmond Greyfriars		Franciscan Friars Minor, Conventual (under the Custody of Newcastle) founded 1257-8, attributed to Ralph fitz Randal, Lord of Middleham; dissolved 19 January 1539; granted to John Banaster and William Metcalf; remains now within a public park	
Richmond Priory		purported Benedictine nuns founded (during the reign of Henry II(?)); dissolution unknown	
Richmond — St Martin's Priory		Benedictine monks cell dependent on St Mary's York; founded 1100-37, granted to St Mary's by Wymar, dapifer to the Earl of Richmond, confirmed by Stephen, Earl of Brittany (Richmond); dissolved 1539; granted to Edward, Lord Clinton 1550/1; now in private ownership	The Priory Church of Saint Martin, Richmond
Rievaulx Abbey		Cistercian monks daughter house of Clairvaux; founded 5 March 1132, site granted by Walter Espec, Lord of Helmsley 1131; dissolved 3 December 1538; granted to Thomas, Earl of Rutland 1538/9; (EH)	River Abbey
Ripon Cathedral Priory ^{+}		monks founded c.654-660 (before 660) by Alchfrid, King of Northumbria; Benedictine? monks c.661; destroyed by fire c.875; refounded; secular canons 10th century? destroyed c.948; secular collegiate refounded before 972; dissolved 1547; refounded as a Royal Free Chapel; episcopal diocesan cathedral founded 1876; extant	The Priory Church of Saint Peter and Saint Wilfrid, Ripon ____________________; Ripon Minster; Rippon Priory
Rosedale Priory ^		Cistercian nuns founded before 1158 (during the reign of Henry I) by Robert de Pillarton; also given as Benedictine nuns with regular priests or brethren until after 1326; dissolved 1535; remains incorporated into houses	St Mary and St Laurence
Scalby Greyfriars ^{~}		Franciscan Friars Minor, Conventual (under the Custody of York) (community founded at Scarborough 1239); transferred here 1245; transferred to Scarborough 1267-72;	Hatterboard Greyfriars; Haterberg Greyfriars
Scarborough Priory		Cistercian monks alien house: cell dependent on Cîteau; founded before 1189: church granted to Cîteau by Richard I; monks arrived by 1203; dissolved c.1407: church and manor granted to Bridlington (East Yorkshire)	St Mary
Scarborough Blackfriars		Dominican Friars (under the Visitation of York) founded c.1252: benefactor Isabel de Beaumont; dissolved 1539: surrendered to Richard Ingworth, Bishop of Dover	
Scarborough Greyfriars		Franciscan Friars (under the Custody of York) founded 1239 community and buildings transferred to new site at Hatterboard (Scalby) 1245; transferred from Scalby 1272; dissolved 1539	
Scarborough Whitefriars		Carmelite Friars founded 1319: two houses granted by Edward II for an oratory and residence; dissolved 1539: surrendered to Richard Ingworth, Bishop of Dover	
Scarth Cell (?)		charter by Stephen de Maynell, during the reign of Henry I, for cell dependent on Gisborough; grant apparently never put into effect	
Selby Abbey ^{+}		hermitage of Benedict, monk of Auxerre 1069, purportedly arrived in England intending to found an abbey; Benedictine monks founded c.1069-70, confirmed 1070; dissolved 6 December 1539; granted to Sir Ralph Sadler 1540/1; in parochial use 1618-present	The Abbey Church of Saint Mary and Saint Germain, Selby Our Lord Jesus Christ, St Mary and St German
Skewkirk Priory		Augustinian Canons Regular cell dependent on Nostell; founded between 1100 and 1135 (before 1144) (during the reign of Henry I), chapel of All Saints granted to Nostell by Geoffrey fitz Pain; dissolved 1539	Skokirk Priory; Tockwith Priory
Snainton Preceptory		Knights Templar	
Staintondale Camera		Knights Hospitaller manor of Stainton Hospital; seized in error as Templar property c.1308; restored to Hospitallers	
Stocking Abbey		Cistercian monks (community founded at Hood 1138); transferred from [Old] Byland 1147: land granted by Roger de Mowbray; transferred to Byland 1177; site possibly located at Oldstead Hall	
Stonegrave Minster		Saxon monastic site, founded by 757	
Swainby Abbey		Premonstratensian Canons — from Newhouse, Lincolnshire founded before c.1187 by Helewisia, daughter of Ranulph de Glanville, Justiciar of England; transferred to Coverham between 1196 (1197) and 1202 (1212-14); possibly retained as a grange thereafter	The Abbey Church of Saint Mary of Charity, Swainby
Tadcaster Monastery		Saxon monastery founded 649 by Hieu; apparently monks and nuns c.655	Calcaria Monastery; Kaelcacaestir Monastery; possibly Healaugh (Heiu-laeg)
Temple Hirst Preceptory		Knights Templar founded 1152 by Ralph Hastings; dissolved 1308-12; granted to Lord Darcy; now incorporated into the buildings of Temple Farm and public house built on site	Temple Hurste
Thicket Priory		Benedictine nuns founded before 1180 (during the reign of Richard I) by Roger fitz Roger; with regular priests and brethren until after c.1308; dissolved 1539; granted to John Aske 1541/2; demolished 1850	St Mary ____________________; Thicked Priory; Thickett Priory
Wass, Stanbrook Abbey^{+}		Benedictine nuns founded in Cambrai, Flanders, in 1625 for expatriate English Catholics. Fled to England after French Revolution, 1795. Sojourned in Liverpool, then Warwickshire. Settled in Stanbrook Hall, Callow End, Worcestershire, 1838. Relocated to N. Yorks. 2007	Convent of Our Lady of Consolation; Stanbrook Abbey; Wass
Wath Priory ^{+}		Benedictine monks alien house: cell dependent on Mont-St-Michel founded before 1156; church of St Mary and manor granted, confirmed by Conan, Duc de Bretagne, Earl of Richmond; abbot's rights disputed, lost trial by combat, renounced claim 1239; church restored 1873, in parochial use as the Parish Church of St Mary	
Westerdale Preceptory		Knights Templar founded before 1203, manor granted by Guy de Bovincounrt with the consent of Hugh de Balliol, confirmed by the King; dissolved 1308-12; Knights Hospitaller camera; later under Beverley	
Whitby Abbey		monks and nuns abbey? granted to St Hilda by King Oswald c.657; Benedictine? nuns refounded? after 664; destroyed in raids by the Danes c.867; Benedictine monks priory founded 1078 (before 1077); built on the site of St Hilda's monastery; abbey before 1109; granted to John, Earl of Warwick 1550/1; (EH)	St Peter St Peter and St Hilda; Streoneschalh
Whitley Preceptory		Knights Templar founded before 1248; dissolved 1308-12;	
Wykeham Priory		Cistercian nuns founded c.1153 by Pain fitz Osbert de Wykham; also given as Gilbertine with regular priests or brethren until 14th century destroyed by fire between 1312 and 1377 (during the reign of Edward III); dissolved 1539; granted to Francis Poole 1544; Wykeham Abbey war hospital built on site	St Mary St Mary and St Michael ____________________; Wykham Priory
Yarm Blackfriars ^^{?}		Dominican Friars (under the Visitation of York) founded before 1266 by Peter de Brus, endowed by Henry III; dissolved 21 December 1538; granted to Miles Wilcock, prior, friars and novices 1539; remains possibly incorporated into house named 'The Friarage' built on site c.1770	The Annunciation (apparently) ____________________; Yarum Blackfriars
Yedingham Priory		Benedictine nuns founded before 1163 by Helewise de Clere (or by Roger de Clere); with regular priests or brethren until after 1314; dissolved 1539; granted to Robert Holgate, Bishop of Llandaff; thereafter granted to the Archbishop of York	St Mary ____________________; Little Mareis; Little Marcis
York Austin Friars		Augustinian Canons Regular (under the Limit of York) founded July 1272, Austins in York granted protection by Henry III, property granted by Lord Scrope of Upsall; dissolved 1538; granted to Thomas Rawson	
York Blackfriars, possible earlier site		Dominican Friars (under the Visitation of York) possibly initially housed at Goodramgate after arrival in the city transferred to new site (see immediately below)	
York Blackfriars		Dominican Friars (under the Visitation of York) possibly transferred from Goodramgate (see immediately above) founded 10 April 1227, chapel of St Mary Magdalene and land granted at the instance of the King; dissolved 1538	St Mary Magdalene
York — Clementhorpe Priory ^{#}		Benedictine nuns founded c.1130 (1125-33) by Thurstan, Archbishop of York; dissolved 1536; granted to Edward Shipwith 1541-2; remains existing 19th century no longer extant	St Clement's Priory
York Crutched Friars		Crutched Friars settled in York c.1307 (early in the reign of Edward II), but when the Archbishop of York disallowed their settling in the city they moved on c.1310	
York — Fishergate Priory ^{~}		Benedictine monks priory cell dependent on Whitby; founded after 1087, granted to Whitby by William Rufus; apparently abandoned before 1536(?) and completely demolished	All Saints
York Friars of the Sack		Friars of the Sack probably founded c.1260 dissolved before 1312, on the death of the remaining friars; house and site disposed of 1312	
York Greyfriars, earlier site		Franciscan Friars Minor, Conventual (under the Custody of York) probably founded c.1230, endowments provided by Henry III January 1236 and 1237 for building transferred to new site (see immediately below) c.1243	
York Greyfriars		Franciscan Friars Minor, Conventual (under the Custody of York) (community founded at earlier site (see immediately above) c.1230) transferred here c.1243; dissolved 27 November 1538; granted to Leonard Beckwith 1542/3	
York — Holy Trinity Priory		secular canons founded before 1069 (before 1066); partly destroyed and abandoned in siege of York by the Danes 1069; Benedictine monks alien house: dependent on Marmoutier; founded 1089 by Ralph Paynell, who restored the church; became denizen: independent 1426; dissolved 11 December 1538; granted to Leonard Beckwith 1542/3; remains incorporated into present parish church	The Priory Church of The Holy Trinity, Micklegate, York ____________________; Christ Church
York — St Andrew's Priory		Gilbertine Canons founded c.1200 by Hugh Murdac, Archdeacon of Cleveland; dissolved 1538; granted to John Bellow and John Broxholm 1545/6	St Andrew
York Whitefriars, Bootham		Carmelite Friars founded 1253; transferred to new site at the Stonebow (see immediately below) 1295	
York Whitefriars, the Stonebow		Carmelite Friars (community founded at Bootham (see immediately above) 1253); transferred here 1295; dissolved 1538; granted to Ambrose Becwith 1543/4	
York — St Anne's Monastic House *		Celtic Orthodox church; founded March 1995; extant	Mother of Mary, the Mother of God
York — St Mary's Abbey		Benedictine monks (community founded at St Olave's before 1086); transferred here 1088-9; dissolved 26 November 1539	The Abbey Church of Saint Mary, York
York — St Olave's Abbey		Secular minster — from Lastingham founded before 1055, built by Earl Siward; Benedictine monks refounded before 1086; transferred to new site 1088-9, becoming St Mary's Abbey	St Olave's Minster at Galmanho
York Monastery, earlier site		Culdees? founded c.937? transferred to new site (see immediately below) after 1086	St Peter
York Monastery		Culdees? (community founded at earlier site (see immediately above) c.937?); transferred here after 1086; rebuilt by William Rufus; became St Leonard's Hospital founded before 1135, under Augustinian rule; dissolved 1540; granted to Robert, Lord Dudley; later called 'the Mint Yard' 1563-4	St Peter ____________________; St Peter's Hospital; St Leoonard's Hospital
York Cathedral ^{+}		Secular (collegiate) founded 625; episcopal diocesan cathedral founded 627; extant destroyed 633; Culdees? 664; Benedictine? monks founded c.972; Secular (collegiate) refounded after 992;	The Cathedral and Metropolitical Church of Saint Peter in York ____________________; York Minster

Return to top of page

=== South Yorkshire ===
South Yorkshire was created in 1974 from part of the former West Riding of Yorkshire.

Foundation	Image	Communities & provenance	Formal name or dedication & alternative names
Beauchief Abbey ^{+}		Premonstratensian canons — from Welbeck, (Nottinghamshire) daughter house of Welbeck; founded 1173-6 (1183) by Robert fitz Ranulph, Lord Alfreton, Albinus, Abbot of Darley, witnessed foundation charter; dissolved 4 February 1537; granted to Sir Nicholas Strelly 1537; remains incorporated into present parish church, restored 19th century	The Abbey Church of the Blessed Virgin Mary and Saint Thomas of Canterbury, Beauchief ____________________; Beauchief Priory; De Bello Capite Abbey
Doncaster Greyfriars ^{#}		Franciscan Friars Minor, Conventual (under the Custody of York) founded before 1284; dissolved 20 November 1538	
Doncaster Whitefriars ^{#}		Carmelite Friars founded 1351, land granted by three people — John of Gaunt later regarded as a founder; dissolved 13 November 1538	
Dunscroft Grange		Cistercian monks probably residential grange dependent on Roche founded after 1186; dissolved with Roche? (25 June 1538)	
Ecclesfield Priory ^		Benedictine monks alien house: cell dependent on St-Wandrille; church granted by Richard de Lovetot; dissolved 1356; granted to the Carthusians of Coventry, Warwickshire (West Midlands); remains incorporated into house built on site 1736	
Hampole Priory		possibly Benedictine nuns founded before 1156 by William de Clarefai and his wife Avicia de Tany; with regular priests or brethren from 12th century to after 1308; Cistercian nuns by 13th century; dissolved 1539	The Priory Church of Saint Mary, Hampole
Monk Bretton Priory		Cluniac monks dependent on Pontefract (West Yorkshire); founded 1153-5 by Adam fitz Suan (Swain); Benedictine monks independent from c.1279; refounded 1279–81; struck off Cluniac list 1291; dissolved 21 November 1539; granted to William Blithman 1540/1; (EH)	The Priory Church of Saint Mary Magdalene of Lund
Roche Abbey		Cistercian monks daughter house of Newminster, Northumberland; founded 30 July 1147 by Richard de Builli and Richard fitz Turgis; dissolved 23 June 1538; granted to William Ramesden and Thomas Vavasor 1546/7; remains incorporated into the grounds of Sandbeck Hall and landscaped by Capability Brown 1774, who demolished much of the claustral buildings; (EH)	The Abbey Church of Saint Mary, Roche ____________________; Roch Abbey
Tickhill Austin Friars ^		Augustinian Friars (under the Limit of York) founded c.1260 (c.1256?) by John Clarell, (?)Dean of St Paul's or Prebendary of Southwell and rector of East Brigford; dissolved 19 November 1538, surrendered to Sir George Lawson and commissioners; remains incorporated into houses called 'The Friars' built on site c.1663	
Tickhill Cell(?)		Cluniac monks possible cell dependent on Lenton, Nottinghamshire — (evidence lacking) founded before c.1415; dissolved after 1504	
Tickhill Trinitarians? ^{≈}		Trinitarians reference to Trinitarians probably indicates Austin Friary	

[top]

=== West Yorkshire ===
Foundation	Image	Communities and provenance	Formal name or dedication and alternative names
Arthington Priory		Cluniac nuns founded 1154-5 by Peter de Ardington; with regular priests or brethren 1155 to after 1318; dissolved 1539; granted to Thomas Cranmer, Archbishop of Canterbury 1542/3	
Barwick-in-Elmete Monastery ^{$?}		Saxon monastery founded before c.730 by Abbot Thrydwulf(?) (before 636); ?destroyed 9th century; Saxon remains in church	
Collingham Monastery		Saxon monastery founded by Eanfled, daughter of King Edwin; destroyed c.875; identified with Ingetlingum (before 1873 considered to be Gilling)	Ingetlingum
Esholt Priory ^{#}		Cistercian nuns founded 12th century; with regular priests or brethren to after 1318; dissolved 1539; site now occupied by house named 'Esholt Hall'	Esseholt Priory
Headley Priory		Benedictine monks alien house: dependent on Marmoutier founded before 1125, benefacted by Ypolitus de Bram, his charter dated 1125; dissolved 1414; granted to Holy Trinity, York	St Mary
Kirklees Priory		Cistercian nuns founded before 1138(?), grant by Reyner (Reynerus) Flandrensis (Flandersis), confirmed by his lord William de Warenne; dissolved November 1539; granted to John Tasburgh and Nicholas Savill 1544/5	The Blessed Virgin Mary and St James ____________________; Kirkleghes Priory
Kirkstall Abbey		hermit community (community founded at Barnoldswick 19 May 1147); Cistercian monks — from Fountains (North Yorkshire) via Barnoldswick (Lancashire) founded 20 May 1152: land granted to community from Barnoldswick by William of Poictou, at the instance of their founder Henry de Lacy; some of the hermits joined the new foundation; dissolved 22 November 1540; now in ownership of Leeds Corporation, public access to church exterior and monastic buildings	
Newland Preceptory		Knights Hospitaller founded after 1199, manor granted by John; chapel rebuilt 1519; dissolved 1540; granted to Francis Jobson and Andrew Dudley 1546/7; chapel demolished c.1860; possible remains of the preceptory chapel incorporated into 16th/17th century fabric in a barn	
Nostell Priory, earlier site		Augustinian Canons Regular founded c.1114 by Robert de Lacy; transferred to new site (see immediately below) before 1120	
Nostell Priory ^{#}		Augustinian Canons Regular (community founded at earlier site (see immediately above) c.1114); transferred here before 1120 (possibly not occupied until 1122); dissolved 1539 (1540); granted to Thomas Leigh 1539/40; site now occupied by a mansion named 'Nostell Priory'	The Priory Church of Saint Oswald, Nostell
Pontefract Blackfriars ^{#}		Dominican Friars (under the Visitation of York) founded 1256 by Edmund de Lacy, Earl of Lincoln (built before 1266 by Simon Pyper); dissolved 26 November 1538; granted to William Clifford and Michael Wildbore 1544/5	St Richard
Pontefract Greyfriars (?)		alleged Franciscan Friars; disputed; probably mistaken for Dominican Friars	
Pontefract Priory		Cluniac monks alien house: dependent on La Charité founded c.1090 by Robert de Lacy; became denizen: independent from 1393; dissolved 1539; granted to William, Lord Talbot 1553	The Priory Church of Saint John of Pontefract
Pontefract Whitefriars (?)		alleged college of Carmelite Friars founded before 1257 (1258) by Edmund Lacy (Earl of Lincoln?); disputed	
Syningthwaite Priory ^{$}		Cistercian nuns founded c.1160 by Bertram Haget; apparently with brethren from c.1169 (papal bull of Alexander III 1172), until 14th century(?); dissolved 3 August 1535; granted to John, Earl of Warwick 1550/1; remains incorporated into Priory Farmhouse, built on site	St Mary ____________________; Sinningthwaite Priory
Temple Newsam Preceptory ^{#}		Knights Templar founded before 1181 (possibly initially located at Newbond), granted by William de Villiers; dissolved 1308–12;	
Wetherby Preceptory		member of Ribstone; Knights Templar founded after 1240, apparently forming a single preceptory with Ribstone; dissolved 1308–12; Knights Hospitaller camera	
Woodkirk Priory		Augustinian Canons Regular cell, dependent on Nostell; founded 1138-47 (before 1135) by William de Warenne and others, who granted chapel of St Mary to Nostell; dissolved 1539 (1540); granted to George Talbot and Robert Savill	Widkirk Priory

Return to top of page

== See also ==
- List of English abbeys, priories and friaries serving as parish churches
- List of monasteries dissolved by Henry VIII of England
- List of abbeys and priories
- List of monastic houses in Scotland
- List of monastic houses in Wales
- List of monastic houses on the Isle of Man
- List of monastic houses in Ireland
- List of cathedrals in England and Wales
- List of cathedrals in Scotland
- List of cathedrals in Ireland
- Listed buildings in England
- Christian monasticism
