= List of monastic houses in Essex =

Locations of monastic houses in Essex
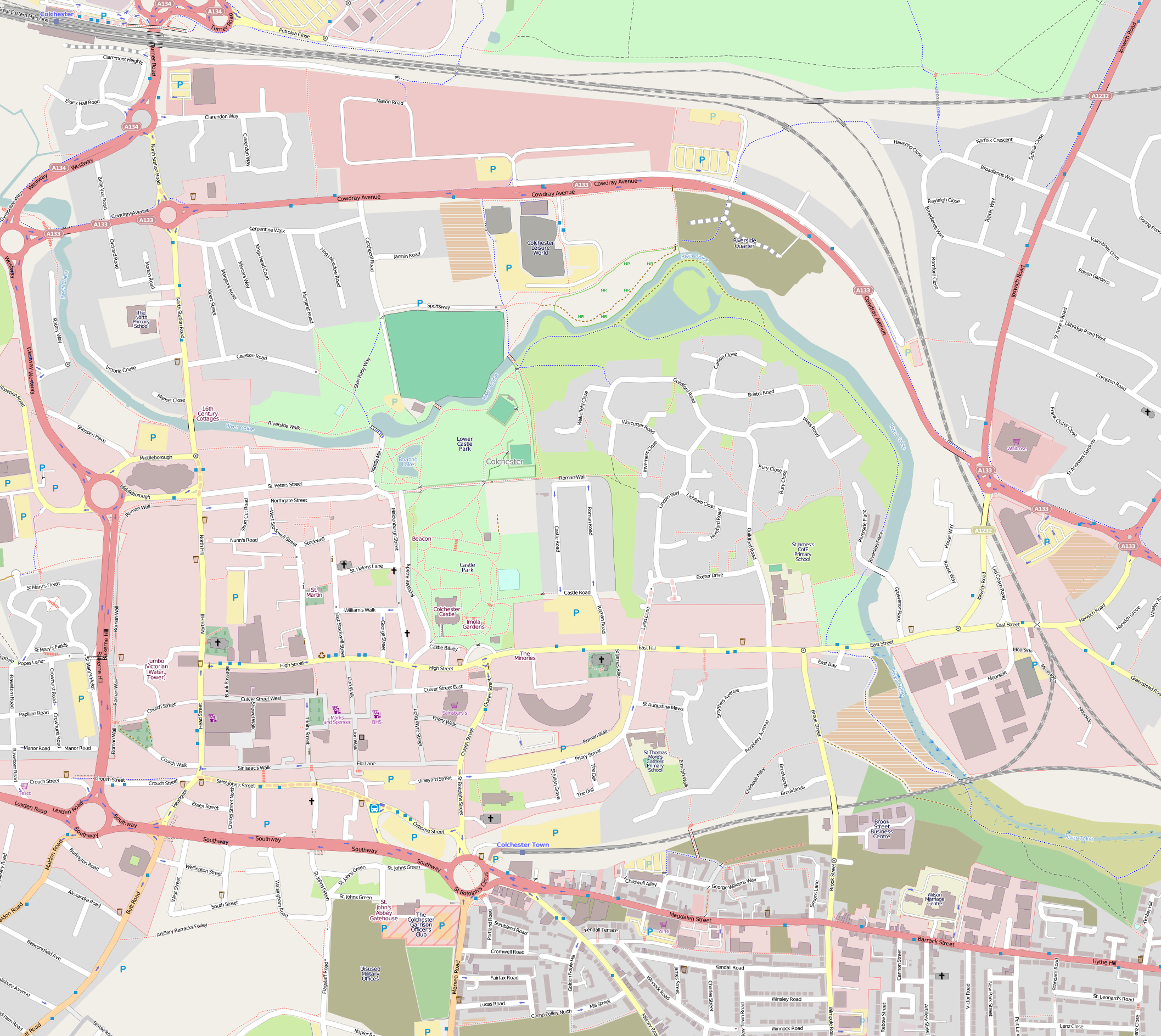
Locations of monastic houses in Colchester

The following is a list of the monastic houses in Essex, England.

Alien houses are included, as are smaller establishments such as cells and notable monastic granges (particularly those with resident monks), and also camerae of the military orders of monks (Knights Templar and Knights Hospitaller). Monastic hospitals are included where they had the status or function of an abbey, priory, or preceptor/commandery.

Abbreviations and key

Status of remains
Symbol	Status
None	Ruins
*	Current monastic function
^{+}	Current non-monastic ecclesiastic function (including remains incorporated into later structure)
^	Current non-ecclesiastic function (including remains incorporated into later structure) or redundant intact structure
^{$}	Remains limited to earthworks etc.
^{#}	No identifiable trace of the monastic foundation remains
^{~}	Exact site of monastic foundation unknown
^{≈}	Identification ambiguous or confused

Locations with names in italics indicate possible duplication (misidentification with another location) or non-existent foundations (either erroneous reference or proposed foundation never implemented) or ecclesiastical establishments with a monastic name but lacking actual monastic connection.

Trusteeship
EH	English Heritage
LT	Landmark Trust
NT	National Trust

== Alphabetical listing ==
Foundation	Image	Communities & provenance	Formal name or dedication & alternative names	References & location
Assandun Minster^{~(/+)}		monastic or secular community founded 1020 (Note: Assandun — consecrated 1020) by Canute; usually identified as Ashingdon, but also Hadstock	Ashingdon Minster?; possibly Hadstock Minster (Ashdon beside Hadstock)	51°36′37″N 0°41′36″E or52°04′45″N 0°16′24″E (possible)
Bedemans Berg Priory		hermitage founded before 1135 (during the reign of Henry I); Benedictine monks cell dependent on Colchester founded before 1135; dissolved 1536	dedication unknown	51°41′36″N 0°21′41″E
Beeleigh Abbey ^		Premonstratensian Canons transferred from Neasham via Parndon 1180; founded before 1172 at Parndon by Robert Mantell; dissolved 1536; granted to Sir John Gate 1540/1; remains now incorporated into private house without public access	Abbey Church of the Blessed Virgin Mary and Saint Nicholas, Beeleigh ____________________; Bileigh Abbey (originally Maldon Abbey)	51°44′16″N 0°39′49″E
Berden Priory ^{#}		Augustinian Canons Regular founded 12th century, probably by a member of the Rocheford family; apparently initially a hospital; dependent on Walden 1343; dissolved 1536; granted to Henry Parker 1537 (1538/9); site now occupied by mansion named 'Berden Priory'	The Priory Church of Saint John the Evangelist, Berden	51°57′04″N 0°07′35″E
Bicknacre Priory		hermitage of Jordan founded before 1175; Augustinian Canons Regular founded 1175 by Maurice Fitz Jeffery and Tiretai, Sheriff of Essex (or Maurice FitzGeoffrey of Tiltey, former Sheriff of Essex): converted to priory late 1175; dissolved 1507 on the death of the last prior, at which time no canons remained; granted to Henry Polsted 1539/40; granted to St Mary's Hospital without Bishopsgate, London	The Priory Church of Saint Mary and Saint John the Baptist, Bicknacre ____________________; Woodham Ferrers Priory; Woodham Priory; Wudeham Priory	51°41′40″N 0°34′57″E
Blackmore Priory ^{+}		Augustinian Canons Regular founded 1152-62 by Adam and Jordan de Samford; dissolved 1525 for Wolsey's college at Oxford; granted to John Smith 1540/1; priory church now in parochial use as the Parish Church of St Laurence	The Priory Church of Saint Lawrence, Blackmore ____________________; Jericho Priory	51°41′25″N 0°19′04″E
Bradwell Minster ^{+}		Roman Saxon Shore fort of Othona reused as monastery Celtic-style community founded c.654 by St Cedd; St Peter's Cathedral built at fort gatehouse; becoming a minster within Diocese of London shortly after October 664 (when Cedd died); believed destroyed in raids by the Danes 9th century; dependent on St Valery on the Somme 1068; sold to William of Wykeham 1391; in use as a barn 1750; restored as a chapel 1920; continuing as ecumenical place of worship and pilgrimage	St Cedd's Monastery; St Peter-on-the-Wall; Ithancester Monastery; Ythancester Monastery	51°44′07″N 0°56′24″E
Burstead Grange^{#}		Cistercian Monks grange or cell dependent on Stratford; during the flooding of Stratford the community transferred here until the re-edification of the abbey		51°36′20″N 0°25′56″E
Castle Hedingham Priory		Benedictine nuns founded ?before 1190 by Aubrey de Vere, 1st Earl of Oxford (or by his wife Countess Lucia (Lucy), later the first prioress); dissolved 1536; granted to John, Earl of Oxford 1536/7	The Priory Church of the Blessed Virgin Mary, Saint James and the Holy Cross ____________________; Castlehedinhgam Priory; Heningham Priory	51°59′24″N 0°35′18″E
Chelmsford Blackfriars		Dominican Friars (under the Visitation of London) founded before 1277 (either at Chelmsford or originally at Fulsham); dissolved 1538; granted to Antony Bonvixi 1542/3	Chelmesford Friary	51°43′52″N 0°28′22″E
Coggeshall Abbey ^{+}		Savignac monks — from Savigny founded 3 August 1140 by King Stephen; Cistercian monks orders merged 17 September 1147; dissolved 5 February 1538; granted to Sir Thomas Seymour 1537/8; Little Coggeshall Abbey called 'Grange Barn'; site now occupied by a private house (re)built 1581 with limited public access; (NT)	The Abbey Church of Saint Mary and Saint John at Coggeshall ____________________; Coxhall Abbey; Coggeshale Abbey	51°52′03″N 0°41′34″E
Colchester Crutched Friary ^{#}		Crutched Friars founded before 1230-35 by William de Lanvelli; by 1392 became a secular hospital or free chapel; Crutched Friars refounded 1496; dissolved 1538; granted to Thomas, Lord Audley 1543/4; location established during excavation 1928	Hospital of the Holy Cross and Saint Helen	51°53′15″N 0°53′30″E
Colchester Greyfriars		Franciscan Friars Minor, Conventual (under the Custody of Cambridge) founded before 1237 by Robert, Lord FitzWalter (who became a friar); dissolved 1538; granted to Francis Jobson and Andrew Audley 1544/5	Colchester Greyfriars	51°53′30″N 0°54′24″E
Colchester — St Botolph's Priory		secular founded c.1093 by Ernulphus (later first prior); Augustinian Canons Regular refounded c.1100-6; dissolved 1536; granted to Sir Thomas Audley 1536/7; (EH)	The Priory Church of Saint Julian and Saint Botolph, Colchester (from before 1106)	51°53′15″N 0°54′16″E
Colchester — St John's Abbey ^{^}		Benedictine monks founded 1096/7 by Eudo, courtier of William the Conqueror; dissolved 1539; granted to John, Earl of Warwick 1547/8; (EH)	The Abbey Church of Saint John the Baptist, Colchester ____________________; Colchester Abbey; Colchester Priory	51°53′06″N 0°54′05″E
Colne Minster		founded before 1045; subsequently site of Earl's Colne Priory		
Cressing Preceptory		Knights Templar founded 1136 (1150) by King Stephen: donor, Maud (Matilda), queen of Stephen; Knights Hospitaller after 1312; dissolved after 1381: plundered during peasants' revolt; private farm 1515; granted to Sir W. Hughes, Kt. 1543/4; passed to Sir John Smyth and his family; 'The Granary' built 1623	Cressing Temple	51°50′16″N 0°36′38″E
Earl's Colne Priory		Benedictine monks dependent on Abingdon, Berkshire (Oxfordshire) founded before/c.1107 by Albericus de Vere (later a monk there) with consent of Henry I and Maurice, Bishop of London; on or near the site of an earlier minster extant 1045; practically independent from 1311; dissolved 1536; granted to John, Earl of Oxford 1536/7; 17th-century house built on site, incorporated into 1865 house currently on site	Earls Colne Priory; Monks Colne Priory; Colne Priory; Colum Priory; Colun Priory	51°55′36″N 0°42′36″E
Frating Abbey				51.846006°N 1.048824°E
Hadstock Minster?		Church of St Botolph, site of important late-Anglo-Saxon church, belonging to Ely, identified by some as Assunden Minster built c.1020 by Canute		52°04′45″N 0°16′24″E (possible)
Halstead Cell		Benedictine monks founded late 11th century (during the reign of William the Conqueror) by Ingelrica, wife of Ranulf Peverell; dissolved; granted to Giles Leigh 1537/8	Halstede Cell	
Hatfield Broad Oak Priory ^{+}		Benedictine monks alien house: cell dependent on St-Melaine, Rennes; founded c.1135 by Aubrey de Vere, father of the 1st Earl of Oxford; dissolved 1534; granted to Sir Edward North 1543	The Priory Church of Saint Mary and Saint Melaine, Hatfield Broad Oak ____________________; Hatfield Regis Priory; Hatfield Broadoak Priory	51°49′37″N 0°14′35″E
Hatfield Peverel Priory ^{+}		Benedictine monks secular college founded before 1087; converted into priory as a cell of St Albans by William Peverel before 1100; dissolved 1536; priory church in parochial use as the Parish Church of St Andrew	The Priory Church of Saint Mary the Virgin, Hatfield Peverel	51°46′08″N 0°36′10″E
Hockley		alternative possible location of Assandun Minster		
Latton Priory ^		Augustinian Canons Regular founded before 1292; abandoned 1534; granted to Sir Henry Parker 1536/7 remains now incorporated into farm buildings	The Priory Church of Saint John the Baptist, Latton	51°44′20″N 0°07′15″E
Leez Priory ^{#}		Augustinian Canons Regular founded before 1200 (13th century) by Sir Ralph Gernoun; dissolved 1536; granted to Sir Richard Rich 1536; site now occupied by 16th-century mansion named 'Leez Priory'	Leighs Priory; Leigh Priory; Little Leighs Priory	51°50′23″N 0°28′02″E
Little Dunmow Priory ^{+}		Augustinian Canons Regular founded 1106 (1104) by Lady Juga; dissolved 1536; granted to Robert, Earl of Sussex 1536/7; part of conventual church now in parochial use as the Parish Church of St Mary	Dunmow Parva Priory	51°51′54″N 0°24′14″E
Little Horkesley Priory		Cluniac monks alien house: daughter house of Thetford, Norfolk (dependent on Lewes, Sussex) founded before 1127 by Robert Fitz Godebald (Robert of Horkesley) and his wife Beatrice; became denizen: independent from 1376; dissolved 1525; church destroyed by bombing in 1940	The Priory Church of Saint Peter, Horkesley ____________________; Horkesley Priory; Horkesley Parva Priory	51°57′06″N 0°51′06″E
Little Maplestead Preceptory		Knights Hospitaller probably founded ?before 1186 by Juliana, daughter and heiress of Robert Dorsnell; dissolved c.1463; granted to George Harper	The Church of Saint John the Baptist, Maplestead ____________________; Maplestead Preceptory; Maplestead Commandery	51°58′29″N 0°39′04″E
Maldon Whitefriars		Carmelite Friars founded 1293 (14th century) by Richard Gravesend, Bishop of London, and Richard Isleham, rector of South Hanningfield; dissolved 1538; granted to George Duke and John Sterr 1544/5		
Panfield Priory		Augustinian Canons Regular alien house: dependent on St-Etienne, Caen; founded 1069/70 (1070–77) by Waleran Fitz Ranulph; dissolved 1413 (1414); granted to Sir Giles Caple 1538/9	Paunsfield Priory	51°54′16″N 0°31′20″E
Parndon Abbey ^{#}		Premonstratensian Canons Regular — from Newhouse founded before 1172 by Robert Mantell; transferred to Beeleigh 1180; traditional site now occupied by buildings of Harlow Newton Golf Club	Abbey Church of Saint Mary and Saint Nicholas, Great Parndon ____________________; Great Parndon Abbey	51°46′24″N 0°04′33″E
Prittlewell Priory ^, Southend-on-Sea		Cluniac monks alien house: dependent on Lewes, Sussex; founded between 1086 and 1121 by Robert Fitz Swain; became denizen: independent from sometime between 1351 and 1374; dissolved 1536; granted to Thomas Audley 1537/8; granted to Sir Richard Rich 1551; acquired by the Earl of Nottingham 1678; then the Scratton family; sold by Daniel Scratton 19th century; bought by Robert Jones 1917; given to Southend Borough 1920; site now within public Priory Park, now in ownership of Southend Corporation	The Priory Church of Saint Mary, Prittlewell	51°33′14″N 0°42′21″E
St Osyth's Abbey ^		Augustinian Canons Regular founded before 1118 by Richard de Belmeis, Bishop of London and St Osyth, on the site of an earlier Saxon nunnery, established as Priory raised to Abbey status; dissolved; granted to Thomas, Lord Cromwell 1539/40 then to Sir Thomas Darey 1551/2; after reformation incorporated into a mansion; now in private ownership with public access	The Abbey Church of Saint Osyth, Saint Osyths ____________________; St Osyth's Priory; Chich Abbey	51°47′59″N 1°04′31″E
Southminster		Saxon minster		
Stansgate Priory		Cluniac monks alien house: cell dependent on Lewes, Sussex; founded 1122 by the predecessors of Lewes Priory; became denizen: independent from sometime between 1351 and 1374; in parochial use as the parish church for Steeple until closure 9 February 1525; dissolved 1525; granted to Cardinal's College Oxford; granted to the Hospital of St John of Jerusalem 1531; sold to Edmund Mordaut 1544	St Mary Magalen ____________________; Stanesgate Priory	51°43′03″N 0°47′37″E
Takeley Priory		Benedictine monks alien house: dependent on St Valery, Picardy; founded 1066–86; dissolved c.1391; now in grounds of Warish Hall	The Priory Church of Saint Valery, Takeley	51°52′32″N 0°16′36″E
Thoby Priory		Augustinian Canons Regular founded 1141-51 by Michael Capra, his wife and son; dissolved 1525; granted to Sir Richard Page, Kt. 1530/1; granted to Wolsey's college at Oxford	Thobey Priory; Ginges Priory	51°39′48″N 0°21′02″E
Thremhall Priory		Augustinian Canons Regular founded c.1150 (11th century or mid-12th century) by Gilbert de Monefixo; dissolved 1536; granted to John Carey 1536/7; site now occupied by a modern house	The Priory Church of Saint James the Apostle, Thremhall	51°52′13″N 0°13′21″E
Tilbury Monastery		Saxon monastery founded c.654 (630) by St Cedd; probably destroyed in raids by the Danes 9th century		
Tilty Abbey ^{+}		Cistercian monks founded 1153 by Robert Ferrers, Earl of Derby and Maurice FitzJeffery; dissolved 1536; granted to Thomas Lord Audley 1543/4; church now in parochial use	Tiltey Abbey	51°54′55″N 0°19′31″E
Tiptree Priory		Augustinian Canons Regular founded 12th century by Ralph de Munchensi dissolved; 16th-century house built on site	The Priory Church of Saint Mary and Saint Nicholas, Tiptree	51°47′54″N 0°43′07″E
Tolleshunt Major Grange				51°46′33″N 0°46′59″E (approx)
Tolleshunt Knights — St John's Monastery *		Orthodox monks and nuns founded 1959; extant	Monastery of John the Baptist (1959) Patriarchal Monastery of St John the Baptist (1965) Patriarchal Stavropegic Monastery of St John the Baptist	51°47′43″N 0°46′56″E
Walden Abbey ^		Benedictine monks founded 1136 by Jeffrey (Geoffrey de) Mandevil[le], Earl of Essex; raised to abbey status 1190; dissolved 1538; granted to Sir Thomas Audley 1538; site now occupied by Audley End House and St. Mark's College	The Priory Church of Saint Mary and Saint James the Apostle, Walden The Abbey Church of Saint Mary and Saint James the Apostle, Walden ____________________; Saffron Walden Abbey; Little Walden Abbey; Walden Priory	52°01′15″N 0°13′16″E
Waltham Abbey ^{+}		secular canons founded ?1016-1035 (during the reign of Canute); refounded before c.1060 by Earl Harold; Augustinian Canons Regular founded 1177 by Henry II; dissolved 23 March 1540; granted to Sir Antony Deny part of church now in use as parish church	Holy Cross	51°41′15″N 0°00′13″W
West Mersea Priory		Benedictine monks alien house: dependent on St Ouen, Rouen; founded c.1046(?) by Edward the Confessor; dissolved 1400; granted to Higham Ferrer's collegiate church 1426; granted to Robert Dacres, Esq. 1542/3; conventual church now in parochial use as parish church of SS Peter & Paul	The Priory Church of Saint Peter and Saint Paul, Mersea ____________________; Mercy Priory; West Meresey Priory	51°46′31″N 0°54′39″E
Witham Preceptory		founded 1138–48, manor granted by King Stephen, his wife Matilda and son Eustace of Boulogne; dissolved before 1200(?), apparently united with Cressing and retained as a manor		51°48′16″N 0°37′26″E
Wix Priory^{+}		Benedictine nuns founded 1123-33 by Walter and Alexander Mascherell; dissolved 1525; site now occupied by Abbey Farmhouse blocked arches of priory church form north wall of the church of St Mary The Virgin	The Priory Church of Saint Mary, Wix ____________________; Wickes Priory; Wikes Priory; Sopwick Priory	51°55′04″N 1°08′41″E

== See also ==
- List of monastic houses in England
