= Footman (disambiguation) =

A footman is a servant.

Footman may also refer to:

- Infantry ("foot soldier")
- Footman (furniture), British term for a metal stand for keeping plates and dishes hot
- Dan Footman (born 1969), American football player
- Philip Williams (MP) alias Footman (c.1519–c.1558), English politician
- Tim Footman (born 1968), British author, journalist and editor
- Moths of the subfamily Arctiinae
