= Whitton, Ipswich =

Former village in Suffolk, England

Coordinates: 52.085°N 1.125°E

Whitton
- Location within Suffolk
- District: Ipswich
- Shire county: Suffolk
- Region: East
- Country: England
- Sovereign state: United Kingdom
- Post town: IPSWICH
- Postcode district: IP1
- Dialling code: 01473

Whitton is an area of Ipswich and once a separate village. It is now a ward of Ipswich Borough Council in Suffolk, England. The civil parish of Whitton in Mid Suffolk district doesn't include the suburb. The site of a Roman villa, the village is thought to have been a Saxon colony, possibly dating from the Saxon invasion of around 430 AD. It appears in the Domesday Book as Widituna, possibly meaning Hwita's farm or White's farm.

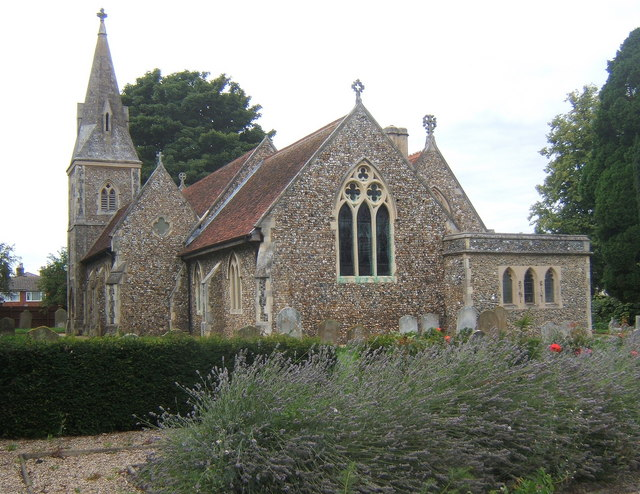
Church of St Mary and St Botolph, Whitton

== Whitton Church ==
Whitton is a village with Saxon origins and it is likely that a small place of worship has been here from the earliest times. At some point in the sixth or seventh century Christianity arrived in the area and this building would have been converted to Christian use. The Domesday Book (1086) lists a church at Whitton (Widetuna) as well as one at Thurleston (Turestuna).

Nothing of either the Saxon or the Norman building remains, however, the original ground plan of the present church seems to follow a traditional simple Saxon church pattern. This church was built during the thirteenth century in the Early English style which was faithfully repeated in the present Victorian reconstruction and enlargement during the 19th Century.

The parish church is dedicated to St. Mary and St. Botolph. The latter is a reminder of all that remains of the now demolished church at the tiny hamlet of Thurleston. St. Botolph was still in use in 1500, but after being amalgamated with Whitton it fell into disrepair. It remained in use as a barn until 1862, when it was demolished and much of the building material used to construct a south aisle and tower for St. Mary's at Whitton.

The dedication (Name) of Whitton Church has been the subject of confusion over the years. At various points in its history it has changed back and forth between St Mary and St Botolph. The confusion arose because Thurleston Church, dedicated to Saint Botolph, was often mentioned in the same sentence as Whitton Church, which was dedicated to Saint Mary. This confusion became more pronounced when the stones of the old Thurleston Church were brought to Whitton in 1862 and used in the construction of the new south aisle and tower.

In 1990 it was decided to bring the confusion to an end, and an official application was made to change the name to St. Mary and St. Botolph.

The old village of Whitton was centred on what was the main Ipswich to Norwich road. Some old buildings remain including the Whitton Maypole, a popular local pub. A map of 1889 shows a "corn" windmill at the top of what is now Shakespeare Rd. There was a post office which was in use until the 1980s and a police station built in 1905. This is now a private house next to the entrance of the former site of Thomas Wolsey School now a small housing estate with its entrance in Malkin Close. The village boasted a second pub almost opposite the police station, The Crown. This was demolished in 1994, replaced by a Land Rover sales garage which in 2012 was bought by BMW.

== Whitton Schools and The 'Poets' Estate ==
An 1891 map shows a "school" in the grounds of St.Mary and St.Botolph Church and another "school" is marked adjacent to the police station - Whitton 'Open Air School' for those suffering from TB which was to grow into Thomas Wolsey School. A smithy is also marked just to the north of the police station on the Norwich Road. The footpath from the Norwich Road to the cornmill remains today as a public right of way south of Ballater Close and north of the recreation ground; the area doubling as playing fields for the Primary School. Whitton Farm was a working farm on the corner of Norwich Road and Whitton Church Lane until the early 1980s. An Ordnance Survey bench mark of 132.8 ft is marked on the road opposite the Whitton Farm buildings. A building labelled White House is shown where Arnold Close and Coleridge Road now stand. This is not to be confused with another building just to the west of Norwich Road which bears the same name and after which the modern White House council estate was named.

Whitton estate was built around the village of Whitton in the mid 20th century, thereby joining it to the nearby town of Ipswich. Most of the street names are called after poets and playwrights.

== Castle Hill and the Crofts ==
Part of the Ecclesiastical parish of Whitton with Thurleston and Akenham is the newer housing area of Castle Hill called 'The Crofts'

The remains of a Roman villa were excavated in 1931 and again in 1949 before residential building started. Coins were found along with a mosaic floor which is on display in Ipswich Museum. It featured on Channel 4's archaeological television programme Time Team in 2004. The dig helped provide more evidence to supplement that gathered in the 1949 dig by archaeologist Basil Brown.

The parish of Whitton is bordered by Ipswich to the south, the parish of Westerfield to the east, the parishes of Akenham (now part of the enlarged parish of Whitton with Thurleston and Akenham) and Claydon to the north and Bramford to the west.

== Sport and leisure ==
Whitton has a Non-League football club Whitton United F.C. which plays at The King George V Playing Fields.

Whitton Sports Centre, run by Ipswich Borough Council, situated at the junction of Whitton Church Lane and Shakespeare Road has a Gym a sports hall, an all-weather bowls rink, a Cycle Racing track and several all-weather pitches.

== Notable people ==
- Alice Flowerdew (1759–1830), teacher, religious poet, and hymnwriter, died in Whitton, and was buried in the churchyard.
