= Priory of the Holy Trinity =

Priory of the Holy Trinity may refer to

- Priory of the Holy Trinity, Dublin, attached to Christ Church Cathedral, c. 1171–1539
- Priory of the Holy Trinity, Ipswich
