= St Mary's Church, Akenham =

Coordinates: 52.0962°N 1.1344°E

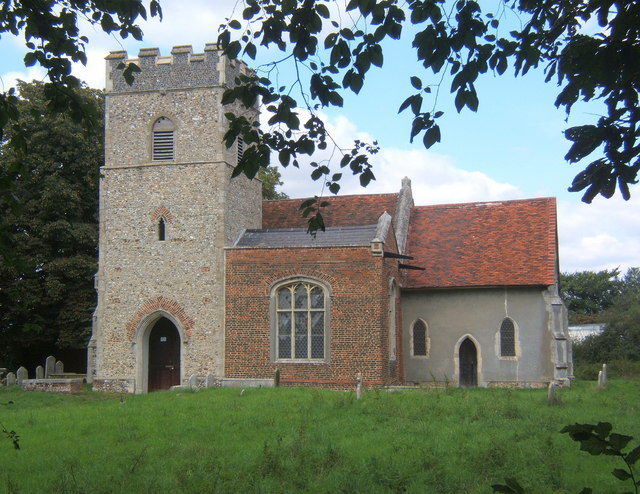
- St Mary's Church, Akenham, from the south

- Location in Suffolk
- OS grid reference: TM 147 489
- Location: Akenham, Suffolk
- Country: England
- Denomination: Anglican
- Website: Churches Conservation Trust

Architecture
- Heritage designation: Grade II*
- Designated: 9 December 1955
- Architectural type: Church
- Style: Norman, Gothic

Specifications
- Materials: Flint and brick with limestone dressings Roofs tiled and slated

St Mary's Church is a historic Anglican church in the village of Akenham, Suffolk, England. It is recorded in the National Heritage List for England as a designated Grade II* listed building, and is under the care of The Churches Conservation Trust. It stands in an isolated position in fields 3 miles (5 km) north of Ipswich.

== History ==
The church dates from the medieval period, the earliest fabric dating probably from the late 13th century. The tower was built during the next century, and more additions and alteration followed in the 15th century. The south chapel was added in the 16th century. The church was restored in the middle of the 19th century. During the second world war, in 1940, it was damaged by a mine dropped from a German bomber. It remained derelict until it was restored by local people assisted by the Friends of Friendless Churches in the 1960s. The church was declared redundant in 1976, and vested in the Redundant Churches Fund, the forerunner of the Churches Conservation Trust.

== Architecture ==
St Mary's is constructed mainly in flint with limestone dressings. The wall of the chancel is rendered. The chapel is in brick. The nave and chancel have tiled roofs, and the chapel is slated. The plan of the church consists of a nave, a chancel, a southwest tower incorporating a porch, and a south chapel. In the north wall of the nave is a slit window in Norman style. The south wall of the chancel contains two lancet windows and a pointed doorway, all in late 13th-century style, and in the north wall is a 14th-century square-headed window. The tower has a north doorway leading into the porch, and over this is a lancet window. The bell openings are louvred. The parapet is battlemented, and has lion-headed gargoyles. The south window in the chapel has three lights. Inside the church is a 15th-century limestone font. It is octagonal and carved with tracery. In the south chapel is a re-set medieval piscina.

== External features ==
In the churchyard to the north of the church is the gravestone of Joseph Ramsey, who died in 1878 aged two years. He was the unbaptised child of a nonconformist family. His burial in a Church of England churchyard led to a legal trial, and as a result a change in funeral practices following the Burial Laws Amendment Act 1880.

== See also ==
- List of churches preserved by the Churches Conservation Trust in the East of England
