= Whitton, Mid Suffolk =

Whitton
- Civil parish
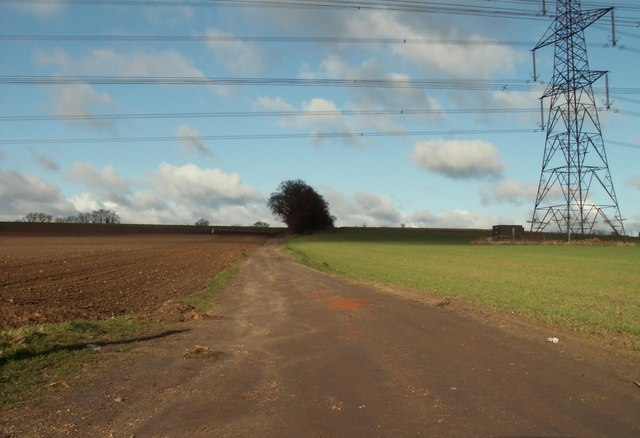
- Interactive map of Whitton
- Coordinates: 52.089145°N 1.1288989°E
- Country: England
- Primary council: Mid Suffolk
- County: Suffolk
- Region: East of England
- Whitton: 1894
- Status: Parish

Area
  - Total: 5.52 km^{2} (2.13 sq mi)

Population (2011)
  - Total: 172
  - Density: 31.2/km^{2} (80.7/sq mi)

Whitton is a civil parish in the Mid Suffolk district, in the county of Suffolk, England. The parish does not include the Ipswich suburb of Whitton. In 2011 the parish had a population of 172. The parish touches Akenham and Claydon. Whitton shares a parish council with Claydon and Barham.

== History ==
The parish was formed in 1894 from the rural part of Whitton cum Thurlston, on 1 April 1952 62 acres was transferred from Akenham to Whitton.
