= Robert Barker (MP for Ipswich) =

16th-century English politician

Robert Barker (died 1571), of Ipswich and Bull's Hall, Suffolk, was an English merchant and politician.

He was a member of parliament for Ipswich in 1559.

Parliament of England
Preceded by Edmund Withypoll with Philip Williams	Member of Parliament for Ipswich; 1559; With: Thomas Seckford	Succeeded by Thomas Seckford with Edward Grimston
