= Panfield =

Village in Essex, England

Coordinates: 51.8993°N 0.5184°E

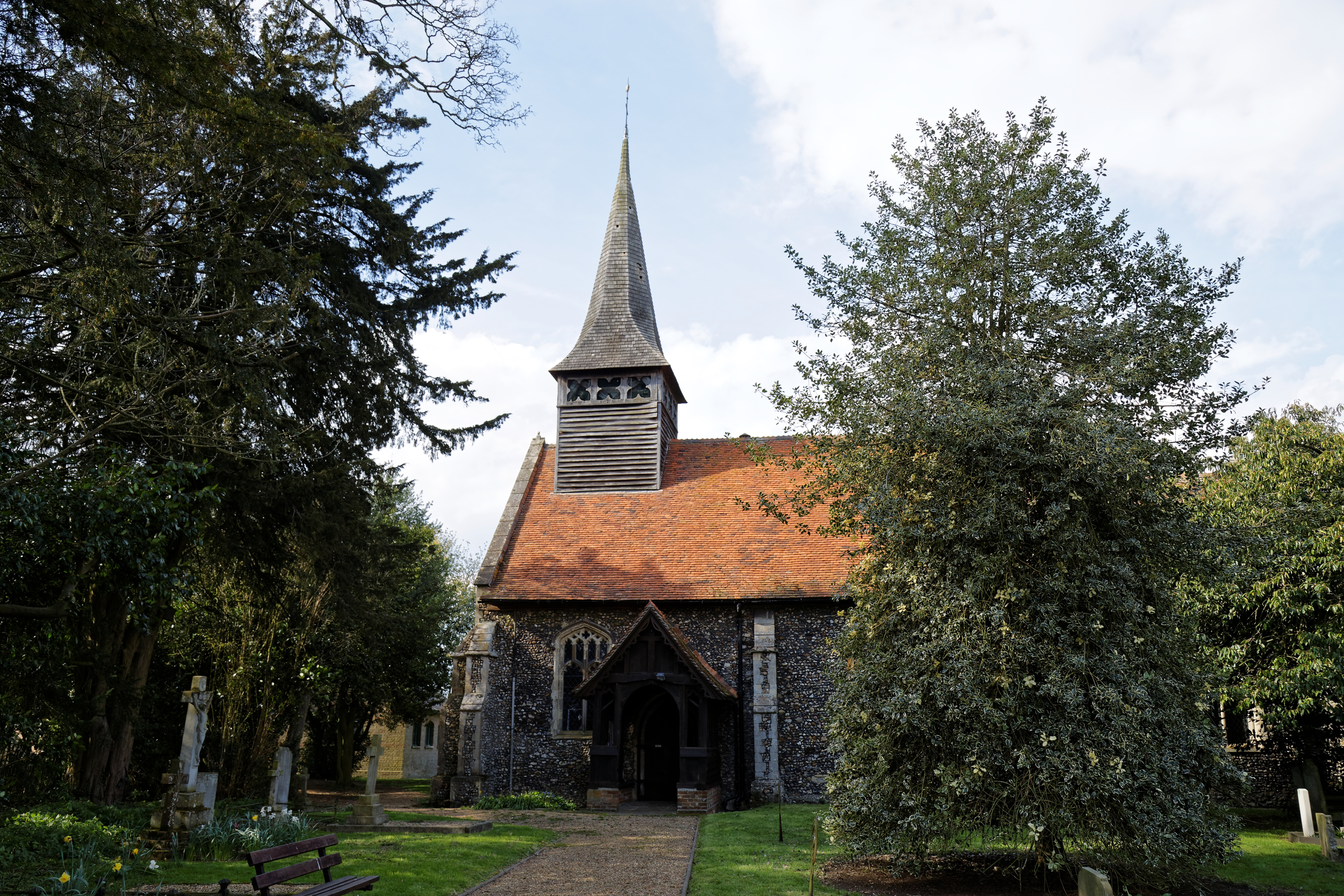
- Church of St Mary and St Christopher

- Location within Essex
- Population: 857 (Parish, 2021)
- Civil parish: Panfield
- District: Braintree
- Shire county: Essex
- Region: East
- Country: England
- Sovereign state: United Kingdom
- Post town: BRAINTREE
- Postcode district: CM7
- Dialling code: 01376
- Police: Essex
- Fire: Essex
- Ambulance: East of England

Panfield is a village and civil parish in the Braintree district of Essex, England. It is near the town of Braintree. In 2021 the parish had a population of 857.

The Grade II* listed Anglican parish church is dedicated to St Mary and St Christopher, although listed by Historic England as 'St Mary the Virgin'. Panfield's other listed buildings include the Grade I listed Panfield Hall, a 16th-century red brick house. Panfield was recorded in the Domesday Book as Penfelda.

No traces remain above ground of the medieval Panfield Priory, an Augustinian monastery sited in Great Priory Farm.
