= Elizabeth Lucar =

British artist (1510–1537)

- Born: 1510; London
- Died: October 29, 1537; London
- Occupation: calligrapher
- Known for: early-modern woman calligrapher

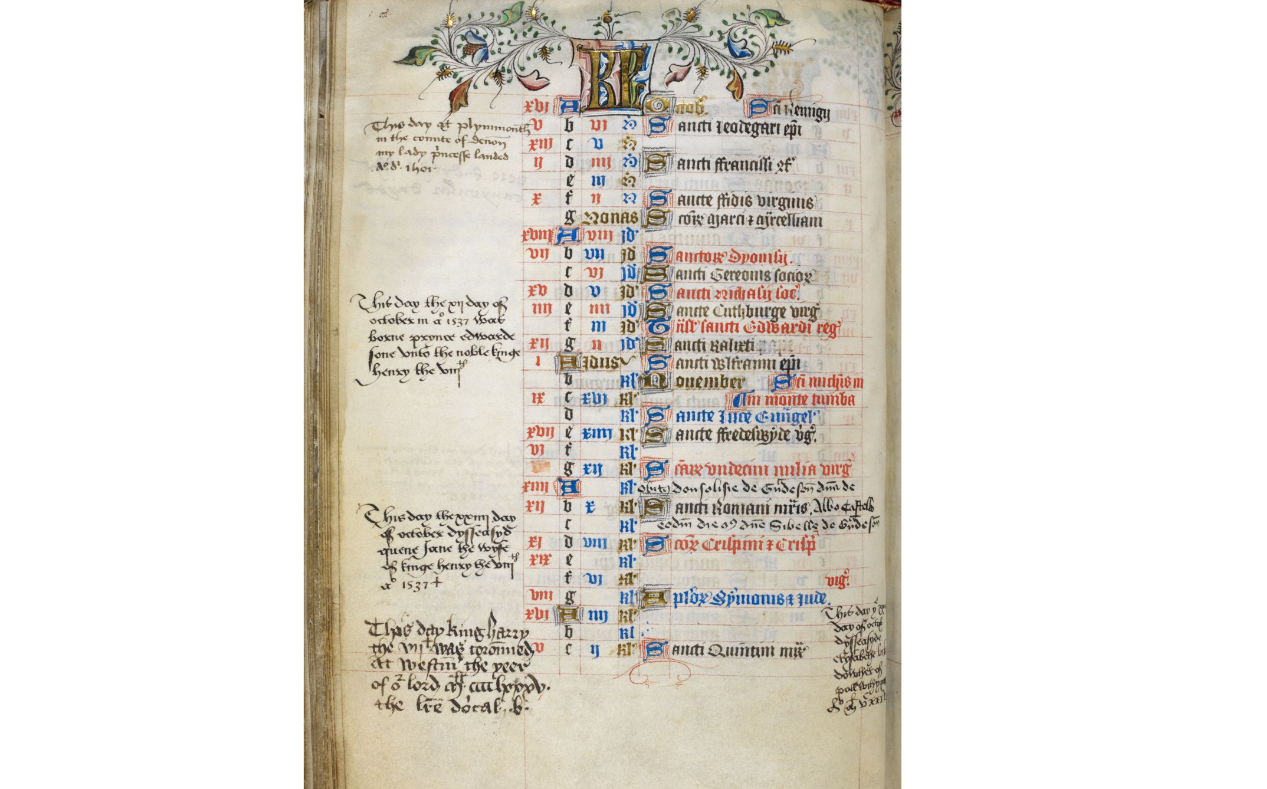
Page from The Beaufort / Beauchamp Hours on which Elizabeth Lucar's death is recorded, lower right (Royal ms 2 a xviii f032v, British Library)

Elizabeth Lucar (née Withypoll; 1510 – 29 October 1537) was an English calligrapher. In addition to her calligraphic skills she was fluent in Latin, Spanish, and Italian, and was an accomplished musician, needleworker and algorist. A member of a prominent and wealthy mercantile family holding royal favour and civic office, her marriage united common interests within the Company of Merchant Taylors.

== Epitaph ==
Elizabeth Lucar was born and died in London and is largely known from an inscription on her tomb in St Laurence Pountney church, London, written or commissioned by her husband Emanuel Lucar (1494–1574). This was recorded by John Stow.

"Every Christian heart seeketh to extoll
The glory of the Lord, our onely Redeemer:
Wherefore Dame Fame must needs inroll
Paul Withypoll his childe, by love and Nature,
Elizabeth, the wife of Emmanuel Lucar,
In whom was declared the goodnesse of the Lord,
With many high vertues, which truely I will record.

She wrought all Needle workes that women exercise,
With Pen, Frame, or Stoole, all Pictures artificiall,
Curious Knots or Trailes, what fancy would devise,
Beasts, Birds, or Flowers, even as things naturall:
Three manner hands could she write, them faire all.
To speake of Algorisme, or accounts, in every fashion,
Of women, few like (I thinke) in all this Nation.

Dame Cunning her gave a gift right excellent,
The goodly practice of her Science Musicall,
In divers tongues to sing, and play with Instrument,
Both Viall and Lute, and also Virginall;
Not onely upon one, but excellent in all.
For all other vertues belonging to Nature,
God her appointed a very perfect creature.

Latine and Spanish, and also Italian,
She spake, writ, and read, with perfect utterance;
And for the English, she the Garland wan,
In Dame Prudence Schoole, by Graces purveyance,
Which cloathed her with Vertues, from naked Ignorance:
Reading the Scriptures, to judge light from darke,
Directing her faith to Christ, the onely Marke."

"The said Elizabeth deceased the 29 day of October An. Dom. 1537. Of yeares not fully 27: This Stone, and all hereon contained, made at the cost of the said Emanuel Merchant-Taylor."

After the destruction of St. Laurence Pountney church in the Great Fire of London of 1666, the brass plate inscription was moved to St. Michael, Crooked Lane.

== "Curious Calligraphy" ==
In a work published in 1904, D.N. Carvalho referred to an essay on the subject of calligraphy written by Elizabeth Lucar in 1525, at the age of 15, entitled Curious Calligraphy. This, he claimed, was the first English essay on that subject, and this claim has been repeated elsewhere. However, the work is not extant and Curious Calligraphy is nowhere else cited. The term 'calligraphy' itself appears anachronistic for English usage of that date. Ballard, in his 1752 Memoir of Elizabeth Lucar, does not mention an essay but described her as 'a curious calligrapher'. It is possible that Carvalho, reading the line of her epitaph 'She wrought all Needle workes that women exercise', interpreted it to mean 'she wrote (of) all needle workes'. The duality of meaning of 'wrought' and 'wrote' has been recognized elsewhere, but in either sense, that line may only mean that she herself delineated the patterns which she afterwards rendered in needlework. The line 'Three manner hands could she write, them faire all' does however indicate that she could write beautifully in three different scripts.

== Reformist connections ==
Elizabeth Lucar's date of death is noted (as an interpolation) in the Calendar of the 15th-century Book of Hours known as The Beaufort/Beauchamp Hours. A closely similar text is annotated into the Calendar of a 1535 printed copy of William Marshall's Prymer (which incorporated English texts of the Psalms translated from Martin Bucer's Latin, disguised by being printed parallel with the Vulgate Latin). The textual identity of the inscriptions in these two calendars indicates that they belonged to someone deeply interested in Reformation psalm-readings to whom Elizabeth was well-known.

Elizabeth's father Paul Withypoll's patronage of religious art is illustrated by the Withypool Triptych, a devotional painting of the Virgin and child with Saints Catherine and Ursula, including a portrait of Paul Withypoll. An attendant female figure is shown playing the lute. This masterpiece was commissioned by Paul from the Italian artist Antonio Solario and completed in 1514.

== Family ==
Elizabeth was the daughter of Paul Withypoll (c.1485–1547), Master Merchant Taylor, Alderman and M.P. for London and his wife Anne, daughter of Robert Curzon of Brightwell, Suffolk. Paul was the third son of John Withypoll of Bristol and his wife Alyson, daughter and heiress of John à Gaunt of Cardiff; that John Withypoll of Bristol was the son of Robert Withypoll of Wythipool in Shropshire, origin of the surname.

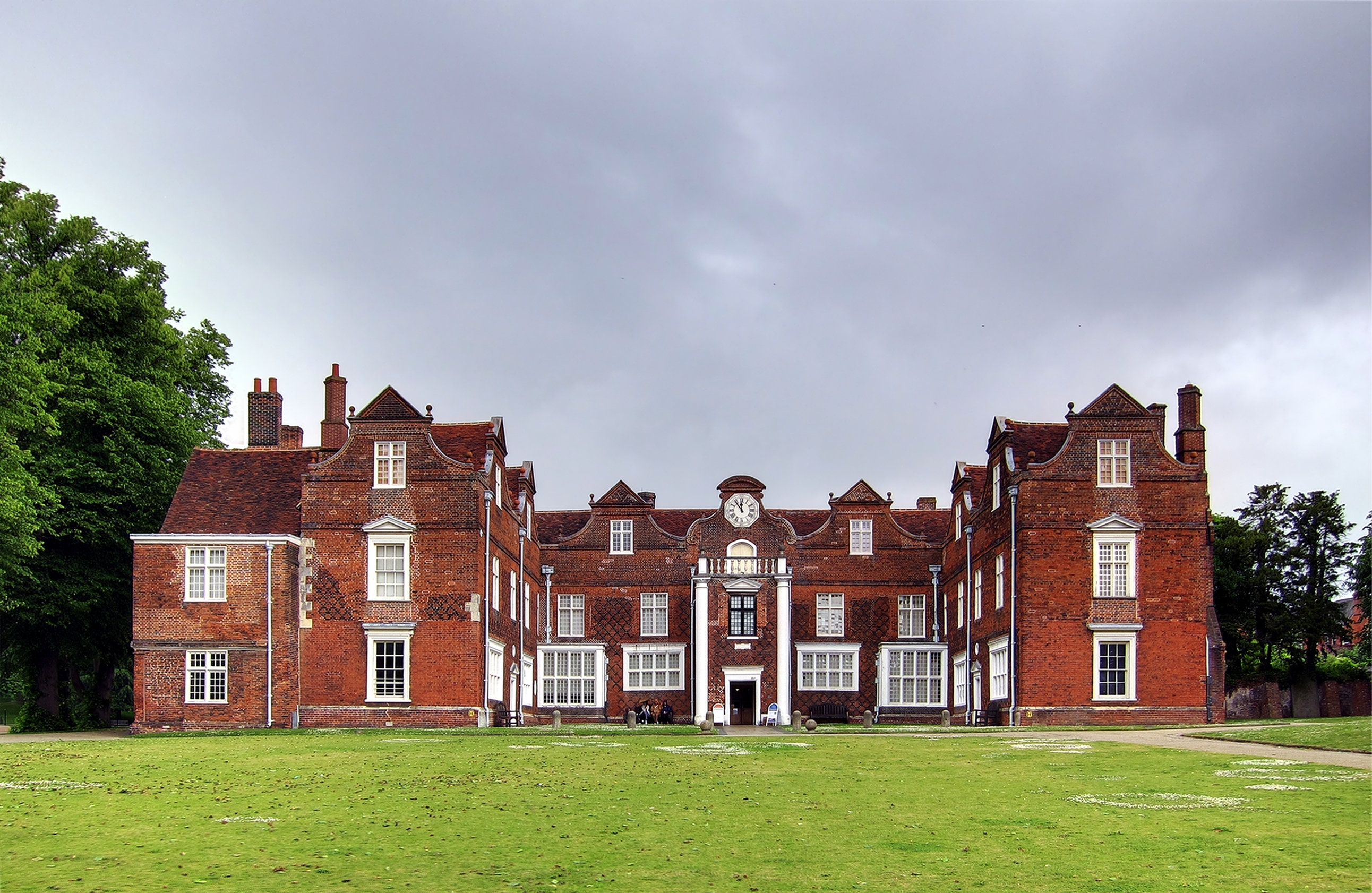
Christchurch Mansion, Ipswich, built by Edmund Withypoll in 1548-50 on the site of the former Holy Trinity Priory, purchased by his father Paul Withypoll.

Elizabeth was the sister (possibly the only sibling?) of Edmund Withypoll, M.P., who, after their father had purchased the site of the Holy Trinity Priory of Augustinian canons in Ipswich, built Christchurch Mansion as a private house there in 1548–50. Edmund Withypoll of Ipswich and his wife Elizabeth Hynde had 18 children (several of whom did not survive infancy) to whom Elizabeth was aunt. In 1532 Elizabeth received a bequest of £50 from her extremely wealthy uncle Robert Thurne or Thorne, merchant of London and Bristol (who had married her aunt Ellen Withypoll). The Thorne and Withypoll families (between whom there were older ties of kinship) were engaged in an international trading syndicate and were conspicuous collectors of precious objects.

Elizabeth married Emanuel Lucar (born Bridgwater, Somerset, 1494, died London 1574), the great-grandson of Richard Lucar, Steward to the Duke of Exeter in the time of Henry VI of England (brother of William Lucar, Forester of the Forest of Exmoor to Henry VI), from John Lucar of Bridgwater, son of John Lucar of Wythecomb. Elizabeth's children – Emanuel, Henry, Mary, Jane, and another daughter – and those of her husband's second wife Joan Turnbull or Trumball are shown in the 1568 Herald's Visitation of London.

A painted portrait of Elizabeth Lucar is referred to in the will of Emanuel Lucar.

== Heraldry ==
The following arms are recited for Elizabeth in the 1568 Visitation:

Quarterly. 1 & 4, Per pale or and gules, three lions passant in pale within a bordure counterchanged. 2. Azure, three bars or, over all or a bend engrailed gules three pheons argent. 3. Azure, a cross moline between four crosses patté or.

== Legacy ==
Lucar's name is one of 999 on the "Heritage Floor" of Judy Chicago's Dinner Party, an epic feminist art installation that narrates the history of women in western civilization from prehistory to the twentieth century.
