= A. Flowerdew =

English poet and hymnist (1759–1830)

- Born: Alice (unknown surname); 1759; Bury St. Edmunds, England
- Died: 23 September 1830 (aged 70–71); Whitton, Suffolk, England
- Resting place: churchyard, Church of St Mary and St Botolph, Whitton
- Occupations: teacher, religious poet, hymnwriter
- Spouse: Daniel Flowerdew (d. 1801)
- Writing career
- Language: English
- Notable work: "Fountain of Mercy! God of Love!"

Alice Flowerdew (1759 – 23 September 1830) was an English teacher, religious poet and hymnist. Her main work was Poems on Moral and Religious Subjects (1867). She kept a ladies' boarding school in Islington, moving it later to Bury St. Edmunds.

== Early life ==
Alice (sometimes mistakenly referred to as "Anne") Flowerdew was born in 1759, in Bury St. Edmunds, England. Her maiden name is not known. She was erroneously referred to as "Anne" by Sir Roundell Palmer and other authorities, an error that a living descendant corrected.

== Career ==
She was the second wife of Daniel Flowerdew, who for a few years held a government customs appointment in Jamaica. After he had resigned that position in slave-owning Jamaica and requested other employment, the couple returned to England with relief at the end of the 18th century.

After losing her husband in 1801, the widowed Flowerdew kept a ladies' boarding school in Islington, where she wrote most of her poetry. In 1802, her stepson, Charles Frederic Flowerdew, also died. While living in Islington, she attended the ministry of the Rev. Dr John Evans, author of A Sketch of the Several Religious Denominations (1795) and some other works. He was Minister of the General Baptist Church, Worship Street, London, and an Arian. Flowerdew is said to have held the same views. Some time between 1806 and 1811, she moved her school to Bury St Edmunds and became a member of the Bury "Glasshouse" congregation.

=== Writings ===
In 1803, Flowerdew published by subscription a volume entitled Poems on Moral and Religious Subjects, which was sold through her friend Henry Delahoy Symonds and through Martha Gurney. Some lines praised Lady Mary Wortley Montagu for her struggle to establish smallpox inoculation, and her subscribers included Edward Jenner, who had devised it. In her preface dated 24 May 1803, she notes that they were "written at different periods of life — some indeed at a very early age, and others under the very severe Pressure of Misfortune, when my pen had frequently given that relief which could not be derived from other employments." A second edition appeared in 1804.

"Fountain of Mercy! God of Love!"
(hymn)

Fountain of Mercy! God of Love!
How rich, Thy bounties are!
The rolling seasons, as they move,
Proclaim Thy constant care.

When in the bosom of the earth
The sower hid the grain,
Thy goodness marked its secret birth,
And sent the early rain.

The spring's sweet influence was Thine,
The plants in beauty grew;
Thou gav'st refulgent suns to shine,
And mild refreshing dew.

These various mercies from above
Matured the swelling grain;
A yellow harvest crowned Thy love,
And plenty tills the plain.

Seed-time and harvest, Lord, alone
Thou dost on man bestow;
Let him not, then, forget to own
From whom his blessings How.

Fountain of love! our praise is Thine;
To Thee our songs we'll raise,
And all created nature join
In sweet harmonious praise.

Further poems and a preface on female education were added to a third edition, where there appeared her well-known harvest hymn, "Fountain of mercy, God of love". This is sometimes attributed to John Needham and was probably altered from a hymn by him (1768). It is believed by a relative of Flowerdew to have been written before 1810, and other relatives and friends of the family are agreed in ascribing it to her. By comparing it with Needham's hymns, it will be seen to be superior especially in form. Relatives and friends of the family are agreed in ascribing it to her. She wrote other pieces later, but these were not published in a collected form.

== Death ==
Flowerdew eventually moved to Ipswich. She died in Whitton on 23 September 1830 and was buried in the churchyard there. Her tomb reads: "Sacred to the memory of Mrs. Alice Flowerdew, who died September 23, 1830, aged 71 years." She was survived by a grandson, J. D. McKenzie, of St. Albans.

== Selected works ==
- Poems on Moral and Religious Subjects (1867)
