= Frating Abbey =

Notional abbey in Essex, England

Coordinates: 51.846006°N 1.048824°E

Frating Abbey was reputedly an abbey in the village of Frating, in Essex, England. There is no evidence however that there was more than a farm here belonging to either St Botolph's Priory, Colchester, founded c. 1093, or to Wix Priory, founded c. 1125.

The current house, the first to be named Frating Abbey Farmhouse, built by a Mr Boghurst, dates from the mid-nineteenth century. It replaced a manor house called Wheelers, mentioned twice in the Essex feet of fines in 1547. and 1564. Deeds for the manor of Kirby Hall in 1814 included the manor of Wheelers with mansion and 200 acres in Great Bentley, Frating and Thorrington. The first edition of the Ordnance Survey map showed the location as Wheelers from 1805. The Ordnance Survey map of 1878 however shows the site as 'Frating Abbey on the site of [Gothic script] Frating Abbey'. The parish boundaries of Great Bentley and Thorrington, as well as the parliamentary boundaries of Clacton-on-Sea and North Essex and Harwich, pass through the house.

The first mention of Frating Abbey as an address is from 1853 in a letter written to the editor of the Essex Standard and General Advertiser.
