= Takeley Priory =

Monastery in Essex, England

Coordinates: 51.869602°N 0.266933°E

Takeley Priory, dedicated to Saint Valery, was a Benedictine monastery in Takeley, Essex, England, founded by William the Conqueror between 1066 and 1086, that is to say, after the Conquest and before Domesday Book. The priory, with substantial landholdings in Essex and Middlesex, was given to the Abbey of Saint-Valery in Normandy, as a thank-offering for their assistance in facilitating William's crossing of the Channel in 1066 to invade England.

In 1391 Richard II licensed the abbot of Saint-Valery to sell the priory and its lands to William of Wykeham for his two collegiate foundations, New College, Oxford, and Winchester College: the Middlesex estates went to Winchester and the Essex estates to New College.

There are no built remains but the site, which now contains Warish Hall, is well preserved and has yet to be excavated.
