= St Mary's Church, Wix =

St Mary's, Wix
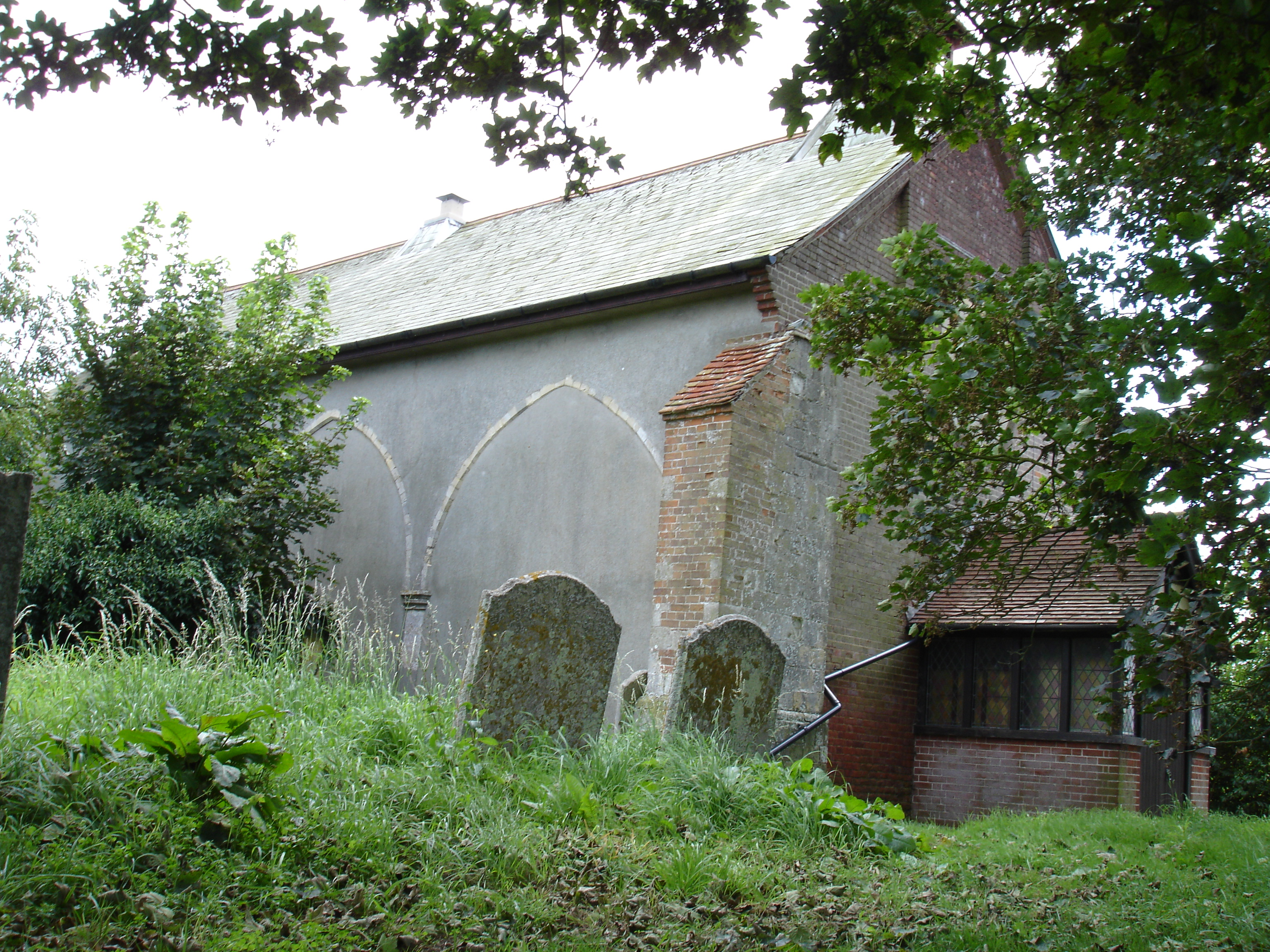
- St Mary's, showing the 13th-century arches on the north wall
- St Mary's, Wix
- 51°55′04″N 1°08′41″E
- Denomination: Anglican

History
- Status: Active
- Founded: c. 1125

Architecture
- Functional status: Parish church
- Heritage designation: Grade II
- Designated: 17 November 1966

Administration
- Diocese: Chelmsford
- Parish: Wix St Mary the Virgin

St Mary's Church is a Grade II listed Anglican parish church in the village of Wix, Essex, England. Formerly associated with a priory from the Middle Ages, the present church dates largely from the 18th century.

== Wix Priory ==
The Priory of St Mary was a Benedictine nunnery founded in c. 1125 by brothers Walter Mascherell, Alexander de Wix and their sister Edith, who were the children of Walter the Deacon, who owned much of the area in the late 11th and early 12th centuries. The priory incorporated a church which had existed at the location since c. 1050. The priory was never large, containing only around ten nuns, but was still highly influential in the immediate vicinity. It owned large areas of land in Wix and much of the surrounding countryside. It held the status of a manor in its own right, and the tenants of its copyholds in Wix were obliged to perform manorial service.

By the time of the Peasants' Revolt (1381), this was generating friction, and during the revolt, the priory was attacked by its angry villagers, who destroyed its manorial rolls which detailed their obligations to it. After the Revolt had ended, those responsible were evicted by the prioress, who then fined each one before allowing them to return.

The priory remained in operation until the 16th century, though it became increasingly run down. In 1525, it was shut down by Thomas Wolsey, being one of 30 small religious houses which were closed to provide funding for The King's School, Ipswich, and the Oxford institution now known as Christ Church. After its closure, the priory was demolished, leaving only the church. The only remains of the priory which can still be seen are the now-blocked 13th-century arches which form the church's north wall.

== Later history ==
The church was later restored and mostly rebuilt in 1744, then again in 1888, with much of the original limestone and rubble composition being replaced in brick. Listed status was granted in 1966. The church has a free-standing bell frame, which once contained three bells, though now has only one, dating from the 15th century. An attempt was made in 1975 to steal the bell, which resulted in the frame being replaced with a modern design.
