= Colchester Greyfriars =

Franciscan friary in Essex, England

Coordinates: 51.891645°N 0.906563°E

Colchester Greyfriars, otherwise the Franciscan Friary, Colchester, was a Franciscan friary in Colchester, Essex, England, situated to the north of the town's east gate. It was founded sometime before 1237. In 1309 the friars received a grant of half an acre of land from Robert Fitzwalter, Lord Fitzwalter, on which he built their church. According to John Weever, the antiquarian, in his Ancient Funerall Monuments, Fitzwalter became a friar here himself in 1325, and was buried here.

The friary was dissolved in 1538. The site was described the following year as "[the] site of the house, the hall called 'le olde halle,' the house called 'le fermerye,' the chambers called 'Syr Thomas Tyrrells lodgynge,' the kitchen, the bakehouse, the brewhouse, two little gardens and four acres of land." There are no visible remains.
