= Whitton cum Thurlston =

Former civil parish in Suffolk, England

Coordinates: 52.0858°N 1.1425°E

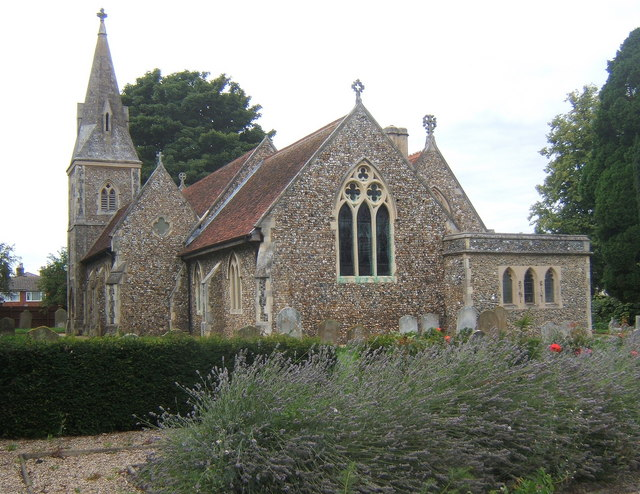
- Whitton

- Location within Suffolk
- Civil parish: Whitton cum Thurleston
- District: Ipswich
- Shire county: Suffolk
- Region: East
- Country: England
- Sovereign state: United Kingdom

Whitton cum Thurlston is a former civil parish in the Ipswich district, in the county of Suffolk, England. It lies two miles north west of the centre of Ipswich. Bramford railway station was built one mile to the south west. Although originally built by Eastern Union Railway by 1868 the station was owned by Great Eastern Railway. In 1901 the parish had a population of 604.

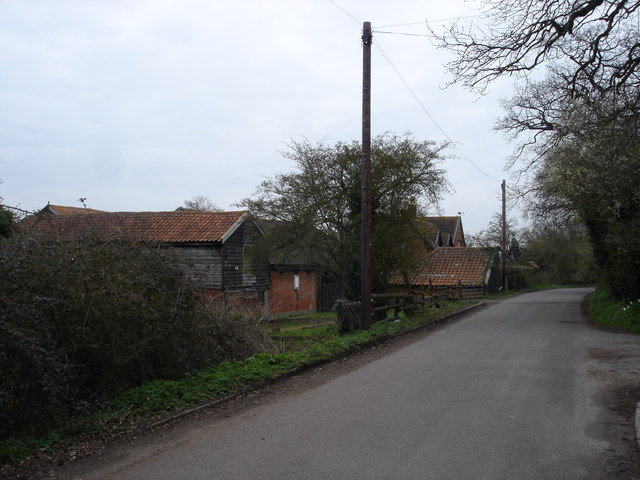
Thurleston

The Ipswich and Stowmarket Navigation (River Gipping) passed through the parish, which included the hamlet of Thurlston. It was formerly in Bosmere and Claydon Hundred.

The living was a rectory in the diocese of Norwich, valued at £250 in 1868, in the patronage of the bishop. The church, dedicated to St. Mary, was rebuilt in 1852. The old church of Thurlston was then used as a barn.

== History ==
Following the passage of the Local Government Act 1894, the parish of Whitton was formed from the rural part of Whitton cum Thurlston, in 1903 the parish was abolished and its area became part of Ipswich.
