= Wix, Essex =

Village in Essex, England

Coordinates: 51.91215°N 1.14201°E

Wix
- Location within Essex
- Population: 804 (Parish, 2021)
- OS grid reference: TM162284
- Civil parish: Wix
- District: Tendring
- Shire county: Essex
- Region: East
- Country: England
- Sovereign state: United Kingdom
- Post town: Manningtree
- Postcode district: CO11
- Dialling code: 01255
- Police: Essex
- Fire: Essex
- Ambulance: East of England
- UK Parliament: Harwich and North Essex

Wix is a village and civil parish in the Tendring district of north-east Essex, England. It lies in a small valley about 2 miles (3 km) south of the Stour Estuary. The valley drains east towards Harwich. Formerly an important crossroads on the route to Harwich, it has now been bypassed by the A120 road. At the 2021 census the parish had a population of 804.

The place-name 'Wix' is first attested in the Domesday Book of 1086, where it appears as Wica. It appears as Wikes in 1191 in the Feet of Fines, and as Wiches in the Curia Regis Rolls in 1198. The name is the plural of the Old English 'wic', meaning a dairy farm.

St Mary's Church, Wix has a detached belfry, which stands in the churchyard and contains one bell. In 1961, the then owner of Wix Abbey Farm was ploughing in the church which was overgrown when he struck a large piece of dressed limestone, which with further investigation revealed a large stone coffin with a skeleton inside. Archaeologists were called in and dated the coffin to circa 1140, due to the decorative cross on the lid having Saxon influences. The skeleton is very likely that of Alexander de Wix, a founder of Wix Priory, which occupied the church grounds until the 12th century. This coffin is now on show, or was until recently on display in Colchester Castle. An almost identical but slightly smaller coffin from the same site can be found in the bellhouse, in the churchyard.

There is one pub, The Waggon at Wix, which on Saturday evenings has live bands. There is also a village shop in Colchester Road next to Anglian Timber. There is an equestrian centre in Clacton Road which hosts dressage, show jumping and carriage driving.

== Nearby places ==
Manningtree	Wrabness	Parkeston
Bradfield	Wix	Great Oakley
Tendring	Thorpe-le-Soken	Clacton-on-Sea

The equestrian centre has now closed down
