= Footman (furniture) =

Footman is a term for a metal stand, usually of polished steel or brass, and either oblong or oval in shape, for keeping plates and dishes hot before a dining room fire. A footman was useful prior to the early 20th century, before hot water was easily obtained, and when open fires were common. Although it is still in occasional use, it is now chiefly regarded as an ornament or collectable antique. The derivation of the word is probably linked to the servant, who could also have had the task of warming the dishes.
