= Panfield Priory =

Former priory in Essex

Coordinates: 51.904364°N 0.522325°E

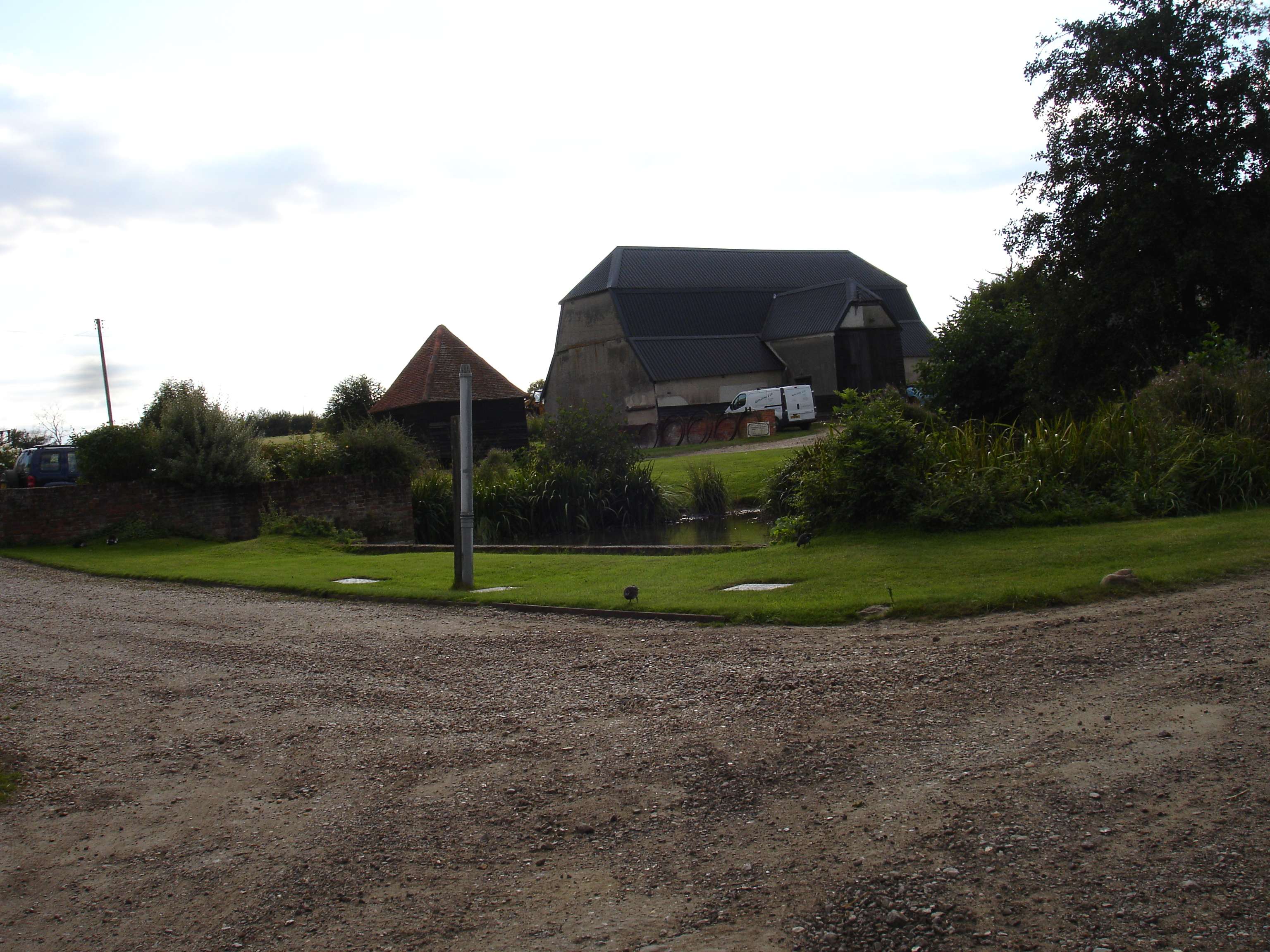
Panfield Priory site today

Panfield Priory was a priory of Augustinian Canons Regular sited in Panfield, Essex, England.

It was a small alien house of only a few monks dependent on St. Etienne Abbey, Caen (St Stephens Abbey). It was founded in 1069-70 (1070–77) by Waleran Fitz Ranulph and dissolved in 1413. In 1472 it was granted to Christchurch, Canterbury. The property was granted to Sir Giles Caple in 1538–39.

Traces of the foundations have been located in a field north of Great Priory Farm, but nothing can be seen above ground.
