= Chelmsford Friary =

Dominican friary in Essex, England

Chelmsford Friary, also Chelmsford Priory and Chelmsford Blackfriars, was a Dominican friary in Moulsham in Chelmsford, Essex, England. Its foundation date is unknown but lay between 1234 and 1277, when it received alms from Edward I. It was dissolved in 1538 and granted to Thomas Mildmay. The buildings were mostly demolished then, and the remaining couple in the 18th century, and no visible remains now survive, although the site has been excavated.
