= Priory of the Holy Trinity, Ipswich =

Monastery in Ipswich, Suffolk, England

Coordinates: 52.0632°N 1.1574°E

The Priory of the Holy Trinity was a priory in Ipswich, Suffolk, England. A church of that dedication was named in the Domesday Book, although the building date of the priory was 1177. After a fire, the monastery was rebuilt by John of Oxford, Bishop of Norwich in 1194.

Until 1300 the local population used the priory as their parish church. However the increasing population led the canons to build the adjacent St Margaret's Church to better accommodate their needs.

The priory was condemned in 1536 during the dissolution of the Monasteries. It was demolished by Edmund Withypoll between 1548 and 1550, to be replaced by Christchurch Mansion.
