= Wix Priory =

Monastery in Wix, Essex, England

Coordinates: 51.917768°N 1.144635°E

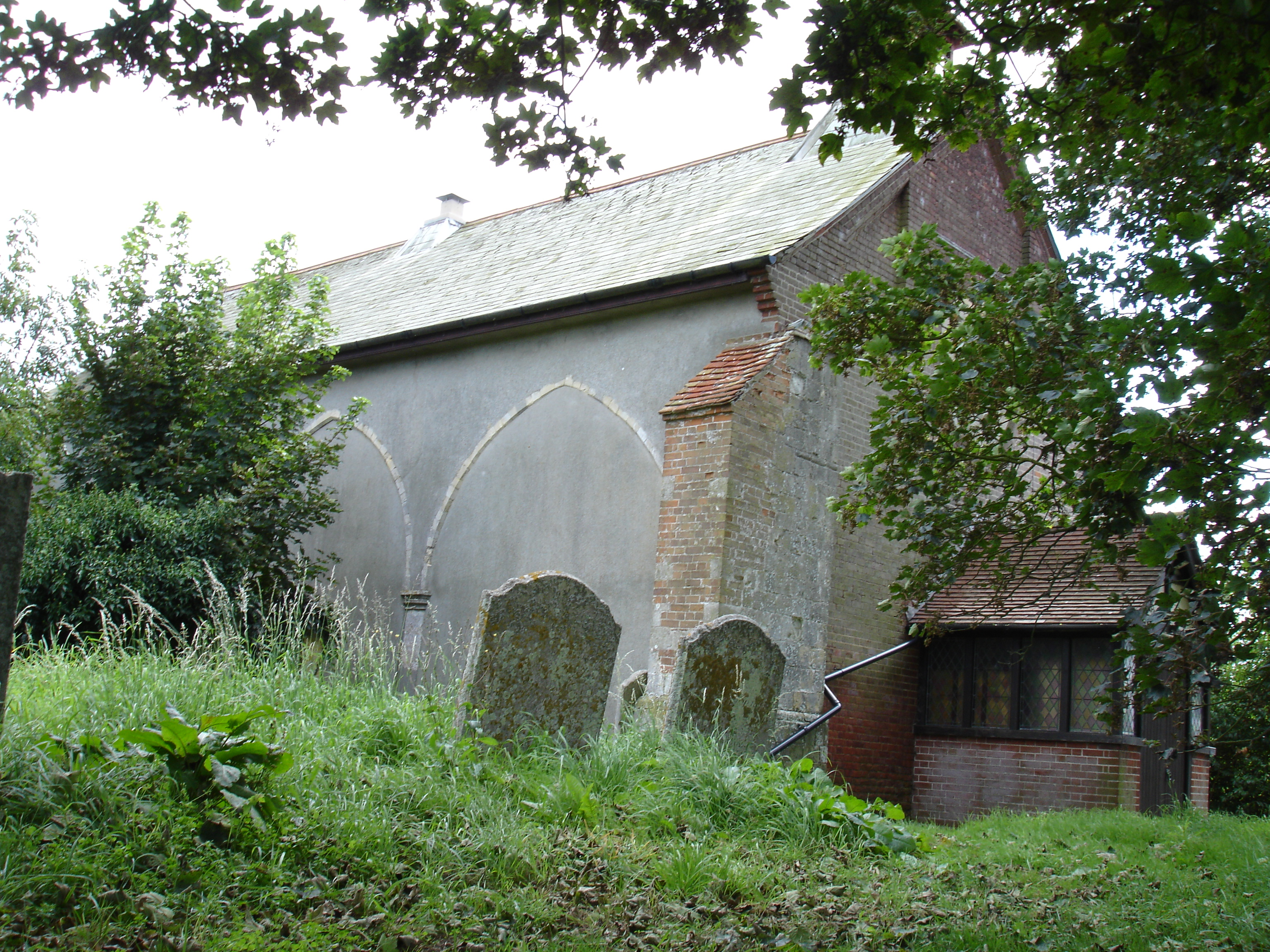
Remains of Wix Priory church incorporated into the wall of post-monastic church

Wix Priory was a Benedictine nunnery in Wix, Essex, England, founded in around 1125–1135 and dissolved in 1525. The buildings have not survived except for the priory church, which is still in existence as St Mary's Church, Wix.
