= Great Parndon Abbey =

Abbey in Essex, England

Great Parndon Abbey was a Premonstratensians abbey in Great Parndon, Essex, England.
