= Burstead Grange =

Monastery in Essex, England

Coordinates: 51.605603°N 0.432174°E

Burstead Grange was a Cistercian house in Essex, England.
