= Colchester Crutched Friary =

Friary in Essex, England

Coordinates: 51.887536°N 0.89189691°E

Colchester Crutched Friary was a friary in Colchester, in the county of Essex, England. The house was founded in 1235, the friary was dissolved in 1538 and the site was discovered in 1928 when pottery was found when 44 Crouch Street was being demolished.
