= Akenham =

Village in Suffolk, England

Coordinates: 52.094°N 1.131°E

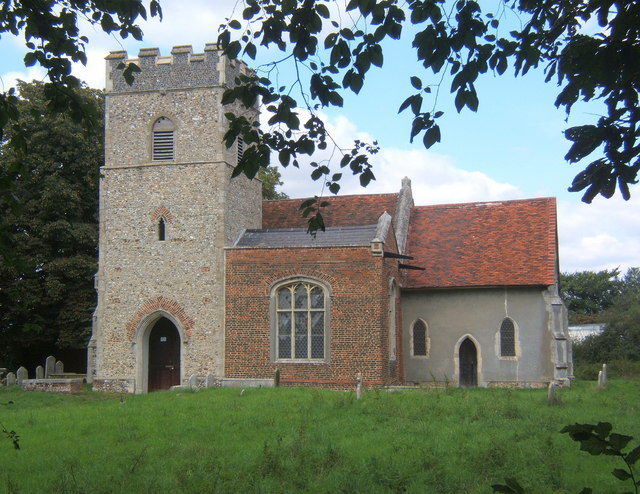
- Church of St Mary, Akenham

- Location within Suffolk
- Interactive map of Akenham
- Population: 60 (2005)
- OS grid reference: TM146486
- District: Mid Suffolk
- Shire county: Suffolk
- Region: East
- Country: England
- Sovereign state: United Kingdom
- Post town: IPSWICH
- Postcode district: IP1
- Dialling code: 01473
- Police: Suffolk
- Fire: Suffolk
- Ambulance: East of England
- UK Parliament: Central Suffolk and North Ipswich

Akenham is a village and civil parish in the Mid Suffolk district of Suffolk in the East of England. Located on the north-western edge of Ipswich, in 2005 it had an estimated population of 60. At the 2011 Census the population remained less than 100 and was included in the civil parish of Whitton.

== History ==
=== Archaeological finds ===
A number of archaeological items have been found in Akenham including metal fragments from the Bronze Age and Iron Age, a Saxon coin and Bronze disc.

Romano-British pottery has been unearthed in fields across the parish. A Middle Saxon gilded bronze pendant or brooch has also been found. A silver penny of the Saxon king Æthelred the Unready was also found nearby as well as bronze fragments thought to represent the Bigod family.

=== Middle Ages ===
Its place name is derived the Old English for 'Ac(c)a's homestead or village'. It was known as Acheham in the Domesday Book which records the population in 1086 to be 50 households made up 48 freemen and 2 smallholders along with 12 acres of meadow, 2 cobs, 7 cattle, and 6 pigs.

=== 19th and 20th centuries ===
In 1901 the population was 104, and the parish covered 1 016 acres.

The abandoned St Mary's church suffered bomb damage during World War II and is maintained by the organisation Friends of Friendless Churches. In August 1878, the church was the scene of one of the great ecclesiastical scandals of the 19th century, centering around the burial of an unbaptized two-year-old child, Joseph Ramsey. The case occupied the national press for a year or more, which reached the high court, and which ultimately led to the Burial Laws Amendment Act 1880.

== Notable buildings ==
Rise Hall near the church is a late Georgian building on the site of an ancient manor house, formerly the residence of the Le Ruse or Rous family in the 13th century. To the south of Rise Hall here is a small moated site with a central island 14.0m across and 0.3m high. The ditch is water-filled on the W side and parts of the N and S sides; the remainder is merely marshy. There are traces of a causeway in the middle of the E side. On the lower W side there are small fragments of a probable retaining wall for the moat. The site lies just S of Rise Hall and it is likely that this moat accommodated a timber-framed dovecote. This could be a precursor site for Rise Hall. A moat might protect the dovecot from poachers but would be expensive to build and maintain. On the other hand, reusing an existing moat would make sense. The mound is small and there is no attached bailey, Rise Hall being about 50m to the north, in an oval enclosure partly defined by ponds. Mottes slightly separate from baileys do occasionally occur but make no sense as defensive features.

Akenham Hall is an 18th-century former manor house with a Gothic facade.

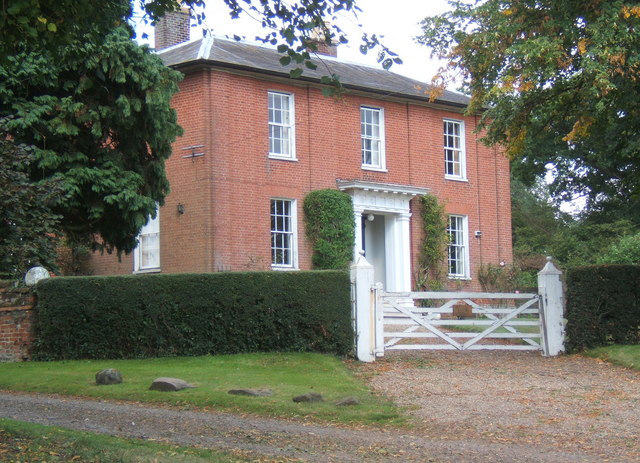
Rise Hall, Akenham

A pair of 6th-century cruciform brooches were found ante 1911 at Akenham Hall, which possibly indicates an inhumation site.

There are a few small businesses operating out of former agricultural buildings, including Stealth Electronics, which specialises in security equipment, based at Akenham Hall Farm. Chives Montessori School is located in the parish. The school was established in 1989, and is a community school serving local needs.

== Geography ==
The parish is bordered by the parish of Whitton to the south, Claydon to the west, Henley to the north and Westerfield to the east.

== Culture ==
Reproduction First World War trenches at Trench Farm in Akenham are used by theatre and re-enactment groups, and have featured in Downton Abbey and Journey's End.
