= Philip Williams (MP) =

16th-century English politician

Philip Williams (by 1519 – 1558 or later), of Ipswich, Suffolk, was an English politician.

== Family ==
Williams is thought to have been the third son of Francis Williams. The family are thought to have originally been from Wales.

He was a successful merchant in 1545. He may be the Philip Williams alias Footman who in May 1556 gave evidence against ‘such as favoured the gospel at Ipswich’. Williams alias Footman lived into the reign of Elizabeth I and lived in St. Mary Tower, Churchgate, Ipswich.

Williams died without issue.

== Career ==
He was a Member of Parliament (MP) for Ipswich in 1558.

Parliament of England
Preceded by John Sulyard with Richard Smart	Member of Parliament for Ipswich; 1558; With: William Wheatcroft	Succeeded by Thomas Seckford I with Robert Barker
