= List of monastic houses in Scotland =

This list of monastic houses in Scotland is a catalogue of the abbeys, priories, friaries and other monastic religious houses of Scotland.

In this article alien houses are included, as are smaller establishments such as cells and notable monastic granges (particularly those with resident monks). The numerous monastic hospitals per se are not included here unless at some time the foundation had, or was purported to have, the status or function of an abbey, priory, friary or preceptory/commandery.

The geographical co-ordinates provided are sourced from details provided by the Royal Commission on the Ancient and Historical Monuments in Scotland (RCAHMS) and Ordnance Survey publications.

== Overview ==
=== Article layout ===
The list is presented alphabetically by council area. Foundations are listed alphabetically within each area.

Communities/provenance: shows the status and communities existing at each establishment, together with such dates as having been established as well as the fate of the establishment after dissolution, and the current status of the site.

Formal name or dedication: shows the formal name of the establishment or the person in whose name the church is dedicated, where known.

Alternative names: some of the establishments have had alternative names over the course of time. In order to assist in text-searching, such alternatives in name or spelling have been provided.

== Abbreviations and key ==
The sites listed are ruins unless indicated thus:
*	indicates the current monastic function
^{+}	indicates current non-monastic ecclesiastic function (including remains incorporated into later structure)
^	indicates current non-ecclesiastic function (including remains incorporated into later structure)
^{$}	indicates remains limited to earthworks etc.
^{#}	indicates no identifiable trace of the monastic foundation remains
^{~}	indicates exact site of monastic foundation unknown

Locations with names in italics indicate probable duplication (misidentification with another location) or non-existent foundations (either erroneous reference or proposed foundation never implemented.

Trusteeship denoted as follows:
HES	Historic Environment Scotland
NTS	National Trust for Scotland
CS	Church of Scotland

Communities/provenance: shows the status and communities existing at each establishment, together with such dates as having been established as well as the fate of the establishment after dissolution, and the current status of the site.

Formal name or dedication: shows the formal name of the establishment or the person in whose name the church is dedicated, where known.

Alternative names: some of the establishments have had alternative names over the course of time. In order to assist in text-searching, such alternatives in name or spelling have been provided.

== List of establishments by county/region ==
=== Aberdeen ===
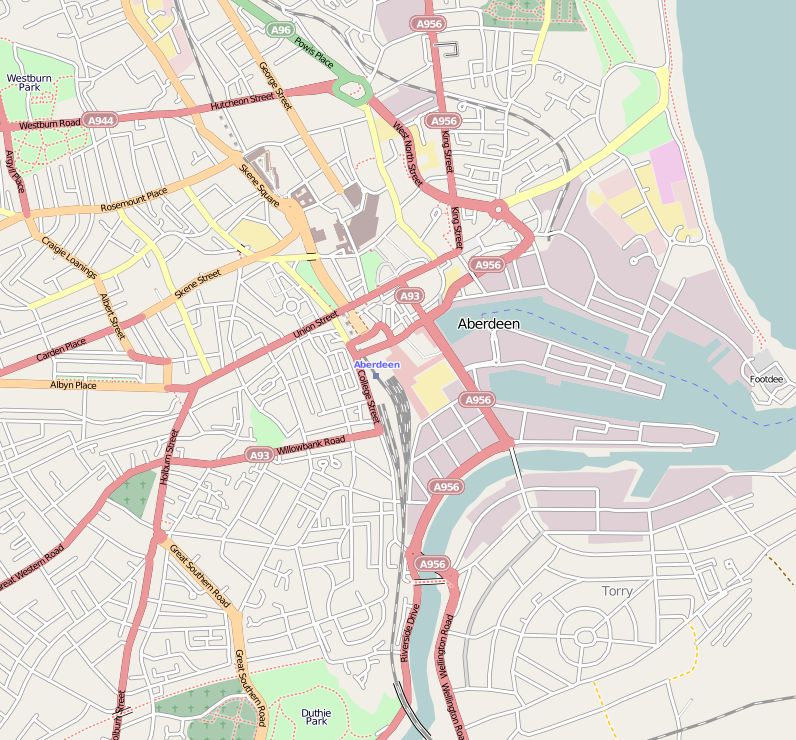
Locations of monastic houses in Aberdeen

Foundation	Image	Communities & provenance	Formal name or dedication & alternative names	References & location
Aberdeen Blackfriars		Dominican Friars founded between 1230 and 1249, purportedly by Alexander II; destroyed by Reformers 4 January 1560; secularised between 1560 and 1587; granted to George, Earl Marischal 17 May 1587; site currently occupied by Robert Gordon's College, Schoolhill - see Parson Gordon's 1661 map showing "Blackfreers".	St John the Baptist	
Aberdeen Greyfriars		Observant Franciscan Friars founded 1469; secularised 29 December 1559; friars resigned entire possession over to the Town Council; granted to the Town Council by James VI 30 December 1567 for conversion into a hospital; extant buildings passed to George, Earl Marischal 22 September 1593; church became derelict until 1624; restored 1624 by the citizens; in parochial use until 1903		57°08′58″N 2°05′48″W
Aberdeen Monastery		Benedictine monks supposed establishment; founded before 3 April 1231, when the Pope granted the use of the church of Culdedono to the abbot and convent 'de Aberdona'; possibly no monastic foundation here		
Aberdeen Nunnery		purported nuns of unspecified order — no evidence of such a foundation	St Catherine	
Aberdeen Preceptory	property of Knights Templars, 'convent and church' are fictitious			
Aberdeen Red Friars		Trinitarians founded before 1274 (1181 (Note: Aberdeen Red Friars — foundation date 1181 given by Father R. A. Hay, Scotia Sacre (MS.34.1.18 in the National Library of Scotland), p.70)) (William the Lion reputedly granted his royal residence in Aberdeen to two red friars 1211); secularised 1561	The Church of the Holy Trinity, Aberdeen	57°08′44″N 2°05′47″W
Aberdeen Whitefriars		Carmelite Friars founded c. 1273: grant made by Reginald le Chen; dissolved 1560-83; passed through several ownerships, eventually granted to the Town Council by James VI 26 October 1583		57°08′44″N 2°05′57″W

[top]

=== Aberdeenshire ===
Locations of monastic houses in Aberdeenshire

Foundation	Image	Communities and provenance	Formal name or dedication and alternative names	References and location
Aberdour Monastery		Celtic monks traditionally founded by Colum Cille and Drostan mac Coscrach, his disciple — provenance doubtful		
Aberdour Priory		Franciscan nuns founded 1548 by James, Earl of Morton; secularised 1560, leased to Earl of Morton 18 August 1560	Aberdene Priory (erroneous)	
Aboyne Preceptory		Knights Templar church granted by Walter Byset, confirmed by Ralph, Bishop of Aberdeen — supposed house		
Banff Greyfriars		supposed Franciscan Friars Minor, Conventual convent; confusion with Carmelite house (Note: Banff Greyfriars — Collections for a History of the Shires of Aberdeen and Banff (Spalding Club, 1843), p.205)	St John	
Banff Whitefriars		Carmelite Friars founded 1321-4, chapel of Our Lady granted by Robert I 21 April 1321, confirmed by him 1 August 1323; burned 20 July 1559; dissolved or secularised 1574, granted to King's College, Aberdeen by James VI 10 September 1574	Priory of Bethlem of ye ordour of Carmelits beside Banff	57°39′15″N 2°32′10″W
Buchan Priory		grant to the canons of St James's, Buchan by the Pope 18 October 1221 - no known house or churches held by regular canons in Buchan, Aberdeenshire - possibly erroneous reference to a location outside Scotland		
Clova Monastery		Celtic monks dependent on Mortlach; founded before 1157 by St Moluag, reference in bull of Adrian IV who confirmed it to the Bishop of Aberdeen	Clovett Monastery; St Luke's Chapel	57°16′43″N 2°54′15″W
Deer Abbey		Celtic monks traditionally founded 6th C by Colum Cille — provenance unreliable Cistercian monks daughter house of Kinloss founded 1214/19 by William Comyn, Earl of Buchan; dissolved 1560; erected to a temporal lordship for Robert Keith, becoming Lord Altrie (charter 1587) (HS)	The Abbey Church of Saint Mary, Deer	57°31′24″N 2°3′14.5″W
Drumtochty Whitefriars	lands granted to the Carmelite Friars of Aberdeen 1403; supposed foundation – no house existed			
Dunet Red Friars		purported Trinitarians allegedly founded 1297 — supposed house – probably fictitious	Dumeni; Dunetum; Dumenum	
Ecclesgreig Monastery		Celtic monks church of Ecclesgyrg granted to St Andrews by Richard, Bishop of St Andrews, confirmed to St Andrews by William the Lion between 1189 and 1195		
Forvie Preceptory		Knights Templar — King's College described as a former Templars' house (Note: Forvie Preceptory: Collections for a History of the Shires of Aberdeen and Banff (Spalding Club, 1843), p.217)		
Fyvie Priory		Tironensian monks dependent on Arbroath; founded in or before 1285, granted to Arbroath by Reginald le Chen (Cheyne) (asserted foundation 1179 by Fergus, Earl of Buchan likely to be confusion with parish church foundation); united with Arbroath by the Pope 21 August 1459 on petition of the abbot and convent of Arbroath; dissolution unknown, possibly survived to the Reformation	The Priory Church of The Blessed Virgin Mary and All Saints, Fyvie	57°25′47″N 2°23′35″W
Kennethmont Cell		monks of unspecified order — purported cell burned down at the Reformation; purported collegiate foundation; parish church, no evidence of monastic foundation		
Monymusk Priory		Culdees founded 1138; Augustinian Canons Regular refounded c. 1245; dissolved 1617	The Priory Church of Saint Mary and Saint John, Monymusk ____________________ erroneously Monymaill in Fyfe	57°13′38″N 2°31′21″W
Mortlach Monastery		traditional early site of the bishopric of Aberdeen		
Tullich Preceptory		Knights Templar given as a residence of Templars, (Note: Tullich Preceptory — J. Spottiswoode, An account of all the Religious Houses that were in Scotland at the time of the Reformation (included in R. Keith, An Historical Catalogue of the Scottish Bishops (Edinburgh, 1824)), p.435) actually a parochial church held by the Templars and later the Hospitallers (Note: Tullich Preceptory — Templaria: Papers relative to the history, privileges and possessions of the Scottish Knights Templars, and their successors the Knights of St. John of Jerusalem (1828), pp.5,7; Abstracts of charters and other papers recorded in the chartulary of Torphichen from 1581 to 1596 (Edinburgh, 1830), p.9)		
Turriff Monastery		Celtic monks founded before 1131; dissolved after c. 1150	St Congan's Church	57°32′16″N 2°27′56″W

[top]

=== Angus ===
Locations of monastic houses in Angus

Foundation	Image	Communities & provenance	Formal name or dedication & alternative names	References & location
Arbroath Abbey		Tironensian monks — from Kelso founded 1176 (1178) by William the Lion; church dedicated 8 May 1233; church damaged by lightning 1380, monks removed temporarily to other locations during repairs; mitred abbey 26 June 1396; dissolved 1606	The Abbey Church of Saint Thomas of Canterbury, Arbroath	56°33′45″N 2°34′56″W
Barry Red Friars		purported Trinitarians supposedly founded 1212 by William the Lion, (Note: Barry Red Friars – Father R. A. Hay, Diplomatum Veterum Collectio (MS. 34-1.10 in the National Library of Scotland), iii, p.573) built and endowed by Alexander II — supposed house – fictional	domus Barensis	
Brechin Monastery		Culdees probably founded before 975; site now occupied by Brechin Cathedral, a congregation of the Church of Scotland.		56°43′51″N 2°39′41″W
Brechin Red Friars		Trinitarians purportedly founded 1256 by "Edward, Bishop of Brechin" (Note: Brechin Red Friars – Father R. A. Hay, Diplomatum Veterum Collectio (MS. 34-1.10 in the National Library of Scotland), iii, p.579) (no such bishop), or c. 1258 by David I (Note: Brechin Red Friars – Manuscript collections of Father Marianus Brockie (Scottish Catholic Archives, Edinburgh), p.1081) — reliable evidence lacking		
Brechin Whitefriars?		supposed Carmelite Friars founded 1376 (in the tenure of Stephen Dempster, Bishop of Brechin) by Malcolm Dempster, Baron of Careston — supposed foundation – details unsubstantiated		
Dundee Blackfriars		Dominican Friars founded c. 1521, benefactions by Andrew Abercromby, Burgess of Dundee (charters 4 September 1315, 1345 and 1388 not considered authentic); petition to the pope by Scottish provincial 16 September 1517 to establish the house; sacked by mob August 1543; probably destroyed November 1548 when the English burned the town	dedication unknown	56°27′39″N 2°58′25″W
Dundee Greyfriars		Franciscan Friars Minor, Conventual founded before 1289 by Devorgilla; (Note: Dundee Greyfriars — foundation: Joannis de Fordun Scotichronicon cum Supplementis et Continuatione Walteri Boweri, ed. Goodall (Edinburgh, 1759): lib. viii, cap. xxv; ibid, i, 474; J. Spottiswoode, An account of all the Religious Houses that were in Scotland at the time of the Reformation (included in R. Keith, An Historical Catalogue of the Scottish Bishops (Edinburgh, 1824)), p.489) built before 1296; (Note: Dundee Greyfriars — date of building: Documents Illustrative of the History of Scotland 1286-1306, ed. J. Stevenson (Edinburgh, 1870), ii, no.484) dissolved or secularised c. 1560		56°27′40″N 2°58′22″W
Dundee Priory		Franciscan nuns founded 1501/2 by James Fotheringham (spurious charter of grant by James Graham of Fintry and Claverhouse); secularised 1560, the Magistrates of Dundee confirmed in possession 14 April 1567		
Dundee Red Friars		purported Trinitarians purportedly founded 1283 by Sir James Scrymgeour; probably hospital – reference to monastic house probably erroneous		
Kettins Red Friars	purported Trinitarians parish church appropriated to hospital of bridge of Berwick, and thereafter to the Trinitarians — no Trinitarian house		Katnes; Ketnes	
Monifieth Monastery		Culdees founded 12thC; secularised by c. 1220: land granted to Nicholas, witness to charters of Countess Matilda, by Earl Malcolm c. 1220; land granted to Arbroath 1242-3		56°28′50″N 2°49′16″W
Restenneth Priory		possible early foundation built c. 710 at the instance of Nechtan, King of the Picts; Augustinian Canons Regular founded between 1161 and 1162, St Peter's church granted to Jedburgh by Malcolm IV; dissolved or secularised 1606	St Peter ____________________; Restennet Priory; Rostin Priory; Rostinoth Priory; Roslin Priory (erroneous reference)	56°39′12″N 2°50′46″W

The following location in Angus has no monastic connection:

- Rossie Priory: mansion, built 1807

Return to top of page

=== Argyll & Bute ===
Locations of monastic houses in Argyll & Bute

Foundation	Image	Communities & provenance	Formal name or dedication & alternative names	References & location
Artchain Monastery, Tiree		Celtic monks founded 6thC? by Findchan, contemporary of Colum Cille		
Ardchattan Priory		Celtic monks founded by Findchan; Valliscaulian monks — from Val des Choux founded 1230/1; part of church in parochial use to 1722; site now largely occupied by Victorian house (HS)	The Priory Church of Saint John the Baptist, Ardchattan	56°27′47″N 5°17′38″W
Bledach Monastery, Tiree		Celtic monks founded before 577 by Brendan, founder abbot of Clonfert		
Cara Red Friars		purported Trinitarians asserted cell; chapel only, no Trinitarian foundation	St Fionnlugh's Chapel	55°38′06″N 5°44′58″W
Cella Diuni, Loch Awe		Celtic monks possibly founded by Diun	St Columba's Church; Kilneuair	56°10′44″N 5°24′09″W
Colonsay Abbey		Augustinian Canons Regular asserted abbey; evidence of monastic house lacking		
Garvellach Islands Monastery		traditionally founded late 6thC by Brendan, founder abbot of Clonfert; probably on the island of Eileach an Naoimh	Ailech Monastery; Eileach-an-Naoimh Monastery	
Hinba Monastery		Celtic monks founded before 597 by Colum Cille, probably on the island of Jura	possibly Jura Monastery (v. infra)	
Inchkenneth Monastery ?		purported monastery – island in ownership of Iona Nunnery — evidence of parish church only		
Inchmarnock Monastery		purported cell of monks — parish church only – island held by Crossraguel, exchanged with Saddell 17 January 1390/1 — no evidence of monastic foundation	Inchmernock	
Inishail Priory		supposed Cistercian nuns remains of a building purportedly a nunnery; purportedly granted to Hay, Abbot of Inchaffray actually a parochial church appropriated by Inchaffray — supposed priory fictitious		
Iona Abbey ^{+}		Celtic monks founded c. 565 by Colum Cille; plundered by the Norse 795 and 802; Benedictine monks abbey founded 1203; dubiously conjectured to have been Tironensian (Note: Iona Abbey — Tironensian: conjectured by W. F. Skene, Celtic Scotland, Edinburgh (1867)) dissolved 1587/8(?); cathedral, request made by the Crown to the Pope 1 April 1498 to establish a see pending the recovery of the see in the Isle of Man from the English, apparently unsuccessful, the monks holding the abbey in commendam from 1499; no evidence of a cathedral chapter being established; now restored and in use as ecumenical Christian community; (HS)		56°20′02″N 6°23′36″W
Iona Monastery		Romanian Orthodox Monks founded 2022 by Hmk. Seraphim Oran for the growing male monastic communicty of Mull Monastery (below)	Orthodox Monastery of the Mother of God and All Saints of Iona	
Iona Priory		Augustinian Canonesses founded before 1208, purportedly by Ragnall mac Somairle (Reginald, son of Somerled); secularised after 1574, granted to Hector McLean of Duart (HS)	St Mary ____________________; Iona Nunnery	56°19′50″N 6°23′36″W
Jura Monastery		possibly Hinba Monastery	Hinba Monastery? (v. supra)	
Kerrara Priory		Cistercian monks apparent intended foundation after 1292 never implemented; no evidence of monastic foundation or occupation by monks on the island		
Kingarth Monastery		Celtic monks founded 6thC, purportedly by St Blane; seat of bishopric (HS)	Cinngrad Monastery	55°44′13″N 5°02′10″W
Lismore Monastery		founded before 592 by Lugaid or Moluag		
Mag Luinge, Tiree		founded before 597; probably at Soroby; destroyed by fire 673; restored		
Mull Monastery		Romanian Orthodox Nuns founded 2010 by Hmk. Seraphim Oran Aldea, upon purchase and restoration of the 18th-century Kilninian Church.	Orthodox Monastery of All Celtic Saints	
Oronsay Priory		Augustinian Canons Regular founded before 1353 (1330), accredited to John, Lord of the Isles; dissolved or secularised 1617, land granted to the Bishop of the Isles by James VI 15 February 1616	The Priory Church of Saint Oran, Oronsay	56°01′12″N 6°15′17″W
Rothesay Abbey		ruined church possibly referred to as St Mary's Abbey (Note: Rothesay Abbey: Ecclesiastical Architecture, iii, p.418) — evidently medieval parish church – no monastic foundation	'St Mary'	
Saddell Abbey		Cistercian monks daughter house of Mellifont, Louth, Ireland; founded before 1207 by Reginald, son of Somerled, Lord of the Isles; dissolved c. 1507; confirmed to the Bishop by James VI 1 January 1507		55°31′56″N 5°30′40″W
Sgòr Nam Ban-Naomha Monastery				
Texa Cell		purported monks' cell (Note: Texa Cell — Joannis de Fordun Scotichronicon cum Supplementis et Continuatione Walteri Boweri, ed. Goodall (Edinburgh, 1759) lib. ii, cap x; i. p.45) evidence of church — cell apocryphal	Helentexa	
Tiree Monastery		founded c. 564-565 by Comgall, founder abbot of Bangor; soon abandoned due to raids by the Picts		56°30′01″N 6°54′34″W

Return to top of page

=== Ayrshire ===
==== East Ayrshire ====
Foundation	Image	Communities & provenance	Formal name or dedication & alternative names	References & location
Mauchline Priory		Cistercian monks grange or 'cell' of Melrose founded 1165, purportedly by David I	The Priory Church of Saint Cuthbert, Mauchline	

Return to top of page

==== North Ayrshire ====
Locations of monastic houses in North Ayrshire

Foundation	Image	Communities & provenance	Formal name or dedication & alternative names	References & location
Fintray Priory		supposed Tironensian monks house built c. 1386, determined to be imaginary		
Holy Island		purported monastery traditionally founded by Ranald, King of the Isles and Argyll or Johne, Lorde of the iles (probably John of Islay); island possessed by Iona — no evidence of monastic foundation		
Irvine Whitefriars		Carmelite Friars probably founded before 1293 by a Fullerton of Fullerton; dissolved or secularised 1572; granted to the Royal School of Irvine by James VI 8 June 1572		55°36′46″N 4°40′25″W
Kilwinning Abbey		Tironensian monks from Kelso founded between 1162 and 1189; dissolved 1592	The Abbey Church of the Blessed Virgin Mary, and Saint Winning, Kilwinning	55°39′12″N 4°41′55″W
Kilwinning Convent		Situated at Stanecastle and mentioned in several charters		
Southannan Priory		Franciscan nuns spurious charter of William, Lord Semple; purportedly reduced to ashes at the Reformation; supposed foundation – spurious provenance; only chapel of St Anandi and graveyard chantry mentioned at the site		

Return to top of page

===== Ayrshire, North non-Christian monasteries =====
Foundation	Image	Communities & provenance	Formal name or dedication & alternative names	References & location
Holy Island Monastery		Tibetan Buddhist		

Return to top of page

==== South Ayrshire ====
Locations of monastic houses in South Ayrshire

Foundation	Image	Communities & provenance	Formal name or dedication & alternative names	References & location
Ayr Blackfriars		Dominican Friars founded before August 1242 (1230) by Alexander II, who endowed the church; leased by the Crown 4 June 1565; secularised 1567, granted to the Burgh of Ayr by charter of Queen Mary 14 April 1567; demolished after the Reformation	The Friary Church of Saint Katherine, Ayr	
Ayr Greyfriars		Observant Franciscan Friars founded 1474 (1472, or between 1488 and 1497), attributed to the citizens; dissolved or secularised 1567;	St John the Baptist ____________________; Auld Kirk of Ayr	55°27′46″N 4°37′43″W
Crossraguel Abbey		Cluniac monks oratory founded before 1214-16 (1244); raised to abbey status, dependent on Paisley from before 1270; dissolved 1617 (HS)	The Abbey Church of Saint Mary, Crossraguel	57°08′55″N 4°43′16″W
Dalmilling Priory		Gilbertine Canons and nuns — double house founded 1219-28; dissolved 1238	Dalmulin Priory	55°20′20″N 4°35′47″W
Fail Monastery		Trinitarians founded before 1335; dissolved 1561	St Mary ____________________; Failford Abbey; Fail Monastery, Tarbolton	55°31′34″N 4°30′09″W
Fail Crutched Friars		supposed Crutched Friars possible confusion with Trinitarian monastery	Pful Friary; Phall Friary; Faill Friary; Fayl in Scotia Friary	
Fail Priory		supposed Cluniac monks probable confusion with Trinitarian monastery	Feale Monastery	
Kar Monastery		Order of Vaudey — no record of monks residing here; land granted to Melrose in perpetual lease 1223 (alternatively given as located in Galloway)		
Ladykirk Preceptory		Knights Templar secular chapel founded c. 1446 by John Blair — misleading references to preceptory	Our Lady Kirk of Kyle	
Lochfeal Red Friars	purported Trinitarians — no such house			

Return to top of page

=== Dumfries and Galloway ===
Locations of monastic houses in Dumfries & Galloway

Foundation	Image	Communities & provenance	Formal name or dedication & alternative names	References & location
Canonbie Priory		Augustinian Canons Regular dependent on Jedburgh; founded between before 1165 and 1170; dissolved or secularised 1606		55°04′25″N 2°56′28″W
Dercongal Abbey		Premonstratensian Canons — from Soulseat founded before 1225, founder unknown; (Note: Dercongal Abbey — Manuscript 33.2.12, National Library of Scotland, gives founder as Devorgilla, daughter of Alan of Galloway; evidently a confusion with Sweetheart Abbey) dissolved or secularised 1609	The Abbey Church of Saint Mary, Holywood ____________________; Holywood Abbey	55°06′02″N 3°38′24″W
Dumfries Blackfriars		supposed Dominican Friars (Note: Dumfries Blackfriars — Manuscript 22.1.14, 153 f., National Library of Scotland) (Note: Dumfries Blackfriars — erroneous entry in J. Spottiswoode, History of the Church of Scotland (1677 Ed.) Appendix, p.16 (25)) (Note: Dumfries Blackfriars — erroneous reference to Friars Preachers (correctly Friars Minor) in Dumfries list (NX 9776), 1 May 1579 (Registrum Magni Sigilli Scotorum, iv, no.32))		55°04′03″N 3°36′51″W
Dumfries Greyfriars		Franciscan Friars Minor, Conventual founded before 1266 by Devorgilla de Balliol (20 April 1234(?) (Note: Dumfries Greyfriars — probably spurious charter of foundation 20 April 1234 by Alan of Galloway cited by Manuscript collections of Father Marianus Brockie (Scottish Catholic Archives, Edinburgh), p.1268) by Alan of Galloway, or c. 1262 (Note: Dumfries Greyfriars — foundation date c. 1262 cited by W. Moir Bryce, The Scottish Grey Friars (Edinburgh, 1909), i, p.199)/before 1305 (Note: Dumfries Greyfriars — foundation date before 1305 cited Early Sources of Scottish History 500 to 1268, ed. A. O. Anderson (Edinburgh, 1922) ii, p.479^{n})) dissolved or secularised 1569, Burgh of Dumfries granted revenues and land 23 April 1569; Town Council gained possession by 1570 (Note: Dumfries Greyfriars — possession by Town Council cited by W. Moir Bryce, The Scottish Grey Friars (Edinburgh, 1909), i, p.214)	St Mary	
Dundrennan Abbey		Cistercian monks — from Rievaulx daughter house of Rievaulx; founded 1142 by David I, or possibly Fergus of Galloway; dissolved 1560; granted to Edward Maxwell 14 August 1562; secularised 1606 (HS)	The Abbey Church of Saint Mary, Dundrennan	54°48′24″N 3°56′52″W
Glenluce Abbey		Cistercian monks — from Melrose daughter house of Dundrennan; founded 1191/2, purportedly by Roland of Galloway, Constable of Scotland; dissolved or secularised 1560; granted to the Bishop of Galloway 1619 (HS)	The Abbey Church of Saint Mary, Glenluce ____________________; Luce Abbey	54°53′21″N 4°49′53″W
Hoddam Monastery		Celtic monks founded before 612 by Kentigern? (traditionally association), who reputedly built church and located the see of his bishopric here		55°02′29″N 3°18′17″W
Kar Monastery	given as located in Galloway, probably South Ayrshire (v. supra)			
Kilconquhar Monastery	purportedly Benedictine monks founded by Fergus (or Ethred), Lord of Galloway — no such location or monastery			
Kirkcudbright Blackfriars		Dominican Friars probably erroneous reference to the house of Greyfriars (see immediately below) (Note: Kirkcudbright Blackfriars — Rotuli scaccarii regum scotorum (The Exchequer Rolls of Scotland), ed. J. Stewart and others (Edinburgh, 1878-1908) xiii, p.472: reference 1512 to Friars Preachers of Kirkcudbright)		
Kirkcudbright Greyfriars ^{+}		Franciscan Friars Minor, Conventual founded c. 1450 (between 1449 and 1456) by James II (or 1239, purportedly by Roger de Quincy, Earl of Winchester, Lord of Galloway and Constable of Scotland (Note: Kirkcudbright Greyfriars — spurious charter 16 September 1239: Tweedie Manuscript, cited by Manuscript collections of Father Marianus Brockie (Scottish Catholic Archives, Edinburgh), pp.1431-2)); dissolved or secularised 1569; destroyed and ruinous before 6 December 1569 when granted to Thomas MacLellan of Bombie by James IV; granted to the Town Council 24 March 1570/1 by Thomas MacLellan, conventual church in parochial use from 24 March 1570/1		54°50′08″N 4°03′16″W
Kirkcudbright Monastery		scholars of a religious community apparently serving a foundation here; still in possession of the church 1164		
Lincluden Priory		Benedictine nuns founded 1164 (before 1174) by Uchtred mac Fergus, Lord of Galloway or Malcolm IV; also given as Cluniac nuns; dissolved 1389; secular canons college late 14thC (HS)		55°05′04″N 3°37′11″W
Lochkindeloch Priory		Cistercian monks — supposed foundation; parish church, but no religious house in the parish other than Sweetheart Abbey		
St Evoca Priory		Cistercian nuns founded before 1423; dissolution unknown	St Evoca the Virgin	
St Mary's Priory, St Mary's Isle (Isle of Trahil)		Augustinian Canons Regular — from Holyrood founded c. 1138 (before 1173); dissolved or secularised 1608	Prioratus Sanctae Mariae de Trayl ____________________; St Mary's Isle Priory; Trail Priory; Traill Priory	54°49′03″N 4°04′03″W
Soulseat Abbey		Premonstratensian Canons — from Prémontre founded 1161(?) (1152); dissolved or secularised 1630	The Abbey Church of Saint Mary and Saint John, Soulseat ________________; Saulseat Abbey	54°53′14″N 4°57′45″W
Soulseat Priory		Cistercian monks uncertain foundation; unverified location and identification	Viride Stagnum	
Sweetheart Abbey		Cistercian monks — from Dundrennan founded 1275 by Devorgilla, widow of John Balliol, endowment by Devorgilla 10 April 1273; dissolved May 1565; granted to William Lesley 1586; secularised 1624, erected to a temporal lordship for Sir Robert Spottiswoode (HS)	The Abbey Church of Saint Mary, Sweetheart ____________________; New Abbey	54°58′44″N 3°36′59″W
Tongland Abbey		Premonstratensian Canons — from Cockersand, Lancashire daughter house of Cockersand; founded 1218; dissolved or secularised 1612		54°51′47″N 4°01′48″W
Whithorn Priory		possible [non-monastic] Christian community late 4thC; possibly monastic by 8thC; Premonstratensian Canons daughter house of Soulseat founded c. 1175 or before 1161 by Fergus, Prince of Galloway; dissolved or secularised 1612; cathedral church of Galloway (HS); Whithorn		54°44′01″N 4°25′03″W
Wigtown Blackfriars		Dominican Blackfriars founded 1267 or before 1287 by Devorgilla, daughter of Alan of Galloway; secularised 1560-70(?), probably granted to the Burgh of Wigtown (though no record found)	The Annunciation of the Blessed Virgin Mary	54°52′01″N 4°26′31″W

Return to top of page

==== Dumfries and Galloway non-Christian monasteries ====
Foundation	Image	Communities & provenance	Formal name or dedication & alternative names	References & location
Samye Ling Monastery *, Langholm		Karma Kagyu school Tibetan Buddhist 1967	Kagyu Samye Ling Monastery and Tibetan Centre	

Return to top of page

=== Dunbartonshire ===
==== West Dunbartonshire ====
Locations of monastic houses in West Dunbartonshire

Foundation	Image	Communities & provenance	Formal name or dedication & alternative names	References & location
Ross Priory, Loch Lomond		doubtful establishment, probable early 19thC invention; country house		56°03′17″N 4°32′51″W

Return to top of page

=== City of Edinburgh ===
Locations of monastic houses in Edinburgh

Foundation	Image	Communities & provenance	Formal name or dedication & alternative names	References & location
Edinburgh Blackfriars		Dominican Friars founded 1230 by Alexander II, site of the king's manor house granted to the friars by him; dissolved or secularised 1566/7, granted to the magistrates and Edinburgh Town Council 13 March 1566/7. The area was eventually turned into the Old High School in 1578, rebuilt in 1777, the area is now part of the University of Edinburgh. Archaeologists discovered the remains of friary during the renovation of the buildings.	The Assumption of the Blessed Virgin Mary	55°56′55″N 3°11′05″W
Edinburgh Greenside Whitefriars		Carmelite Friars founded 1520-5, site granted by the town, with the permission of the king and the bishop of St Andrews; dissolved or secularised before 1563		55°57′26″N 3°10′58″W
Edinburgh Greyfriars		Observant Franciscan Friars founded c. 1463; destroyed by Reformers 14 June 1559; dissolved or secularised 1562; Greyfriars Tolbooth & Highland Kirk built on site 1602-20		55°56′48″N 3°11′32″W
Edinburgh Preceptory		property - asserted preceptory (Note: Edinburgh Preceptory: Reports of the Royal Commission on Ancient and Historical Monuments and Constructions of Scotland — Edinburgh (1951), p.126, no.75: exaggerated description of property)		
Edinburgh Sciennes Priory		Dominican nuns founded 1517, erroneously asserted to have been founded by Lady Roslin, Countess of Caithness; secularised 1569	St Katherine of Senis	55°56′14″N 3°11′09″W
Holyrood Abbey, Edinburgh		Augustinian Canons Regular — from St Andrews daughter house of Merton, Surrey; founded 1128 by David I; sacked by the English 1322; burned by the English 1385; dissolved or secularised 1606; erected into temporal lordship for John Bothwell, son of the bishop 1606 (in parliament), charter 1607; nave in use as the parish church of the Canongate until 1686; partly absorbed into 17thC Holyrood Palace; served as Chapel Royal until mid-18thC (HS)	The Abbey Church of Saint Mary, Saint Andrew and All Saints, Holyrood	55°57′12″N 3°10′16″W
South Queensferry Whitefriars		Carmelite Friars founded 1 March 1440/1 (purportedly founded 1330 by the laird of Dundass, (Note: Queensferry Whitefriars — foundation 1330/1: J. Spottiswoode, An account of all the Religious Houses that were in Scotland at the time of the Reformation (included in R. Keith, An Historical Catalogue of the Scottish Bishops (Edinburgh, 1824)), p.455) or 28 November 1333 (Note: Queensferry Whitefriars — foundation intimated: purported letter of James Dundas, Laird of Dundas, to the Provincial and Vicar-General of the Camelite order in Scotland — Manuscript collections of Father Marianus Brockie (Scottish Catholic Archives, Edinburgh), p.1554)); dissolved before 1564/5; prior granted lease 27 February 1564/5; let by Sir Walter Dundas to the Balies and Town Council of Queensferry as a place of worship and school; present parochial church built on site 1635 (Note: Queensferry Whitefriars — present parish church: Dundas Charters, National Library of Scotland, Mac. xxiv, p.29))	Queensferry Friary	55°59′27″N 3°23′54″W
Sciennes Priory		Franciscan nuns spurious charters including grant by Margaret Knox, daughter of Uchtred Knox of Ranfurly to build a hospital		

Return to top of page

=== Eilean Siar ===
Foundation	Image	Communities & provenance	Formal name or dedication & alternative names	References & location
Barra Red Friars		Trinitarians purported cell – possible church of Celtic origin, supposed house – lacking evidence	The Holy Trinity	
Carnish 'Cell'		Augustinian Canons Regular asserted cell of Inchaffray, purportedly founded by the Macleods of the Lewis; evidence of monastic house lacking	Scarinche	
Nuntown Priory		nuns of unspecified order — probably spurious account of building on Benbecula 'locally believed to have been a nunnery' (Note: Nuntown Priory — New Statistical Account)		
Rowadil Priory		Augustinian Canons Regular; asserted priory; purportedly founded by MacLeod of Harris; evidently no more than parochial church or chapel	Rodwil; Rowadill; Rodel	

Return to top of page

=== Fife ===
Locations of monastic houses in Fife
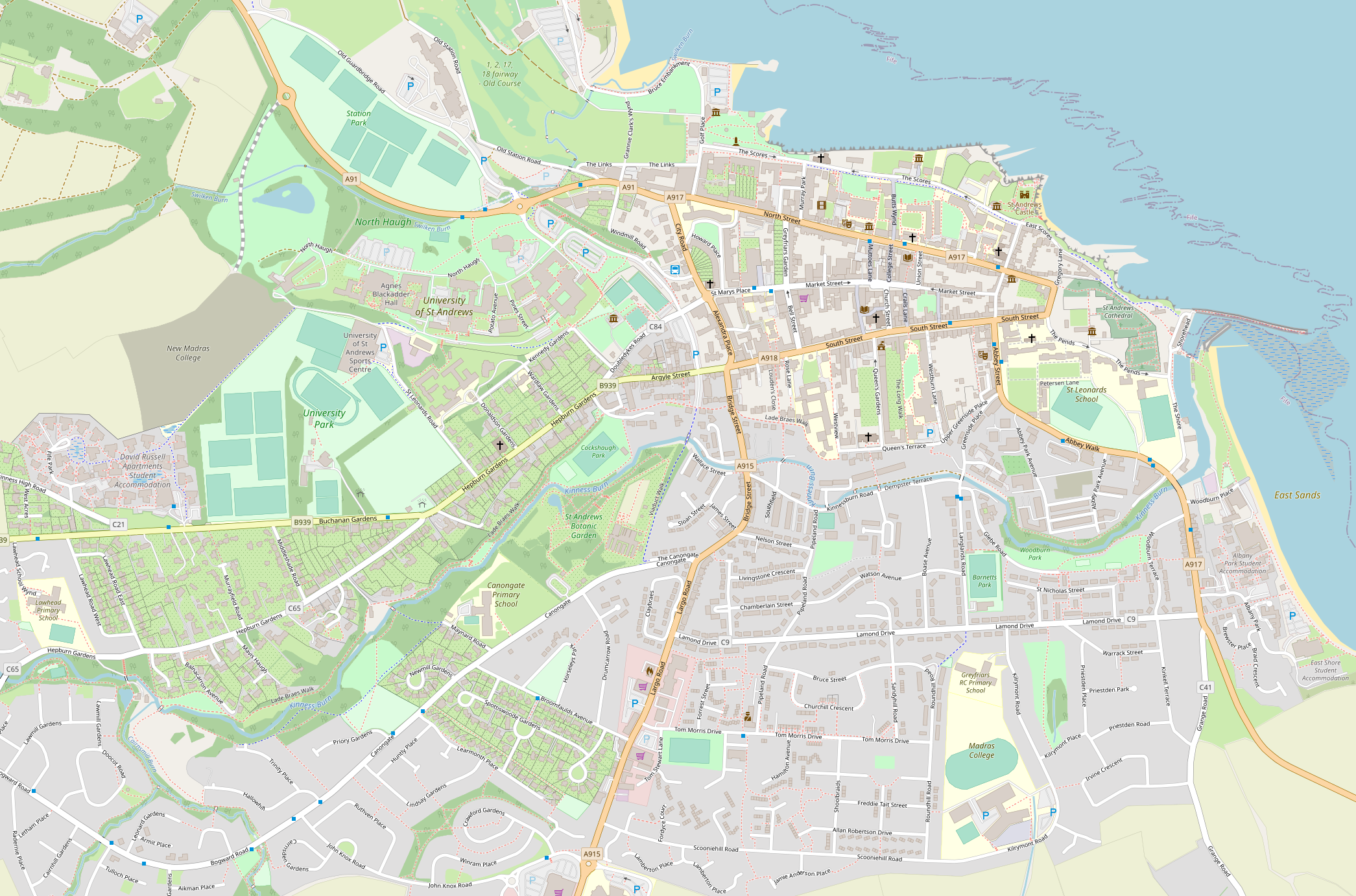
Locations of monastic houses in St Andrews
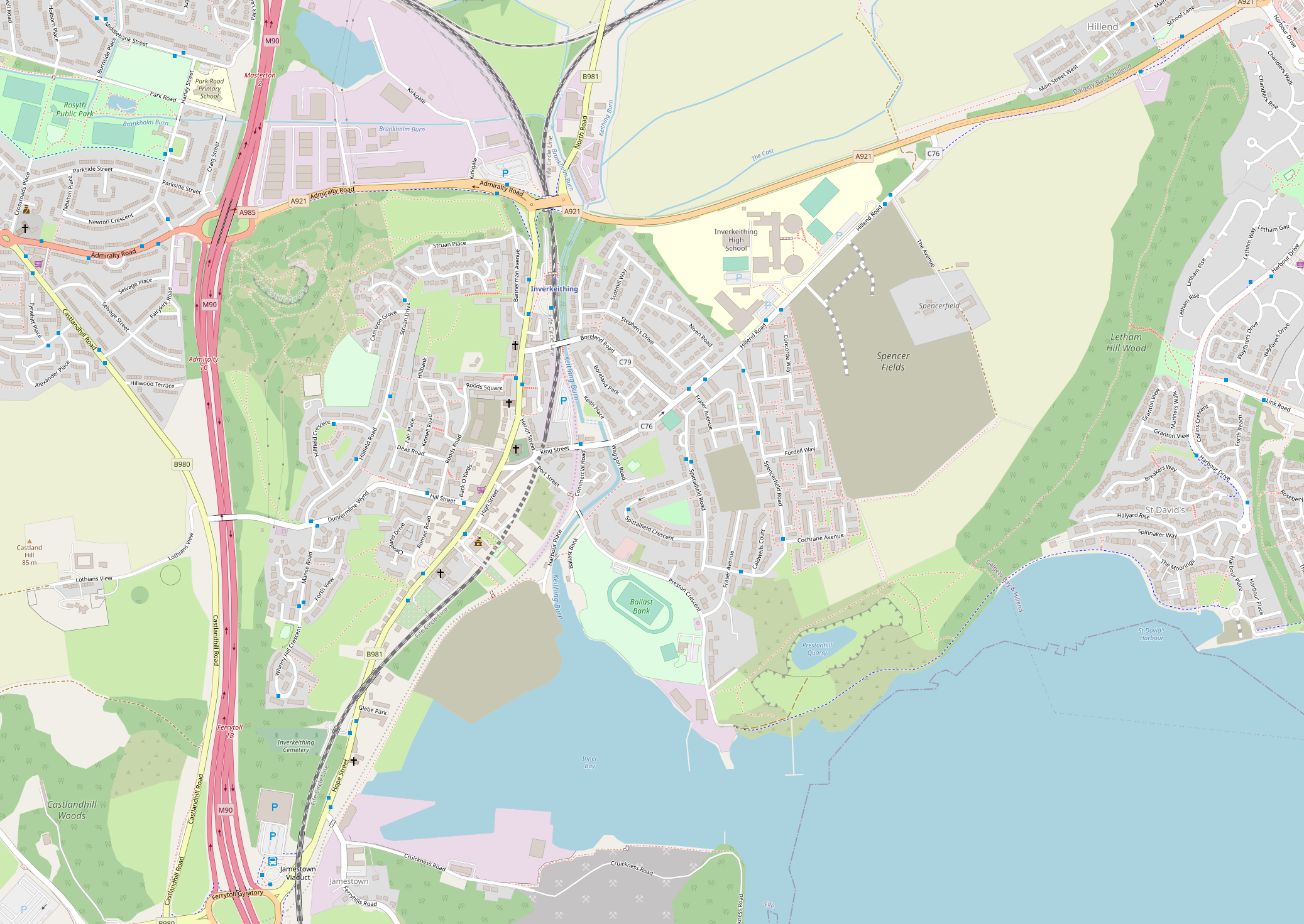
Locations of monastic houses in Inverkeithing

Foundation	Image	Communities & provenance	Formal name or dedication & alternative names	References & location
Balmerino Abbey		Cistercian monks — from Melrose dependent on Melrose; founded c. 1227/9; dissolved 1560; secularised 1603 (NTS)	The Abbey Church of Saint Mary and Saint Edward	56°24′36″N 3°02′30″W
Carnbee Preceptory		Knights Templar foundation unknown; suppressed c. 1309		
Crail Blackfriars		purported Dominican Friars site granted for a church and monastery (spurious charter purportedly of Elizabeth Hepburn, Abbess of Haddington 28 September 1448 (Note: Crail Blackfriars — spurious and unreliable charters cited by Manuscript collections of Father Marianus Brockie (Scottish Catholic Archives, Edinburgh), pp.1254, 1255-7)); reliable evidence of foundation lacking		
Crail Priory		nuns of unspecified order – apocryphal establishment		
Culross Abbey ^{+}		Cistercian monks — from Kinloss dependent on Kinloss; founded before 1217/8; dissolved 1560; erected into a temporal lordship for James Colville of Easter Wemyss (charters 1589, 1609); currently partly in use as a parish church (HS)	The Abbey Church of Saint Mary, Saint Andrew and Saint Serf, Culross	56°03′30″N 3°37′31″W
Cupar Blackfriars		Dominican Friars founded 1348: petition by Duncan, Earl of Fife to the Pope 1348, to found a Dominican convent at his castle; permission granted by the Pope for the vicar-general in Scotland of the English provincial to build a church and oratory; reportedly in a state of collapse by 13 November 1517; proposal to close the house approved 1518, confirmed by Crown charter 4 October 1519; incorporated with the house at St Andrews, where the friars transferred 1519; granted to the Burgh of Cupar by James VI 14 June 1572	St Katherine	56°19′11″N 3°00′36″W
Cupar Red Friars	purported Trinitarians allegedly founded 1277 by James, Earl of Fife — no such person – fictitious house			
Dunfermline Abbey		Benedictine monks priory founded c. 1070; raised to abbey status 1124/1128; dissolved 1593, annexed to the Crown		56°04′11″N 3°27′47″W
Dysart Blackfriars		supposed Dominican Friars (Note: Dysart Blackfriars — included in Dumfries list) (Note: Dysart Blackfriars — Manuscript collections of Father Marianus Brockie (Scottish Catholic Archives, Edinburgh), p.1229 - land granted: spurious charter of William Sinclair of Dysart 27 March 1466/7/8 (year partly obscured)) reliable evidence of foundation lacking; long-ruined chapel converted for use as a forge	St Dennis (chapel); St Cuthbert (church)	56°07′29″N 3°07′14″W possible
Gadvan Preceptory		Cistercian monks cell dependent on Balmerino; founded before 1475; dissolved or secularised before 1578		56°20′57″N 3°09′29″W
Inchcolm Abbey		Augustinian Canons Regular founded 1123	The Abbey Church of Saint Columba, Inchcolm ____________________; St Colm's Abbey, Inch	56°01′48″N 3°18′06″W
Inchcolm Hermitage		purported hermit residence on the island prior to the foundation of the Augustinian house (see immediately above)		
Inverbervie Whitefriars		Carmelite Friars founded before 1443, endowments by William, Earl of Keith and Alexander Strachan of Dullevarde 10 December 1443 (two spurious charters of foundation: 1358 by David II; 12 November 1388 by Mark Rait of Halgreen); dissolved or secularised before 1570; grant of friars' land and property made 15 October 1570; granted to hospital in Montrose 23 July 1571	Bervie Whitefriars	
Inverkeithing Blackfriars		supposed Dominican Friars some references probably pertain to the Franciscan friary (Note: Inverkeithing Blackfriars — included in Dumfries list and W. Maitland, The History and Antiquities of Scotland (London, 1757), i 262) (Note: Inverkeithing Blackfriars — site granted: Manuscript collections of Father Marianus Brockie (Scottish Catholic Archives, Edinburgh), p.1224 - charter (undated) "Hugh de Lundey", Lord of the Burgh of Inverkeithing with the consent of Robert de Bruis index Accounts of the Lord High Treasurer of Scotland, edited by T. Dickson and Sir J. Balfour Paul (Edinburgh 1877-1916), ii (though the text refers to 'Frieris of Inverkethin' (most likely the Franciscan Friars))		56°01′22″N 3°23′51″W
Inverkeithing Greyfriars		Franciscan Friars Minor, Conventual founded 1268(?) (before 1384), built by Philip de Moubray, Lord of Barnbougle; dissolved or secularised 1559	possibly The Friary Church of Saint Mary, Inverkeithing	56°01′47″N 3°23′54″W
Isle of May Monastery		conjectural Culdees or monks establishment (Note: Isle of May Monastery: Annals of the Reigns of Malcolm and William, Kings of Scotland, ed. A. C. Lawrie (Glasgow, 1910) states "It is possible that on the Isle of May, in the beginning of the twelfth century, there was a small fraternity of culdees or monks of the old Scottish church")		
Isle of May Priory		Benedictine monks — from Reading, Berkshire dependent on Reading; Augustinian Canons Regular dependent on St Andrews; refounded late 13th/early 14thC; transferred to Pittenweem late 13th/early 14thC	The Priory Church of Saint Oran and Saint Colman, Isle of May ____________________; May Priory	56°11′08″N 2°33′27″W
Kilconquhar Nunnery	Benedictine nuns actually a parochial church owned by North Berwick Nunnery; sometimes (erroneously) noted as located in Galloway			
Kilrimont Monastery		Culdees traditionally founded by Ungus mac Urguist; collegiate founded 1240s	Cill-rigmonaid Monastery; Cenn-rigmonaid Monastery; Kilrymont monastery	56°20′23″N 2°47′06″W
Kinghorn Blackfriars		purported Dominican Blackfriars (Note: Kinghorn Blackfriars — included in Dumfries list) (Note: Kinghorn Blackfriars — spurious and unreliable charters cited by Manuscript collections of Father Marianus Brockie (Scottish Catholic Archives, Edinburgh), pp.1228: vague account of foundation - probably spurious charter of benefaction of James de Kirkcaldy 28 September 1388) very dubious		56°04′12″N 3°10′27″W
Lindores Abbey		Tironensian monks — from Kelso founded c. 1190 (between c. 1190 and 1191) by David, Earl of Huntingdon; dissolved or secularised 1600	The Abbey Church of Our Lady and Saint Andrew	56°21′10″N 3°13′41″W
Maryculter Preceptory		Knights Templar founded between 1221 and 1236 by Walter Byset; suppressed c. 1309; Knights Hospitaller transferred c. 1309; dissolved c. 1513	Culter Preceptory	
Pittenweem Priory		Augustinian Canons Regular transferred from Isle of May c. 1200		56°12′49″N 2°43′40″W
St Andrew's Blackfriars		Dominican Friars purportedly founded 1274 by William Wishart, Bishop of St Andrews; destroyed by fire by Norman Lesley 1547; destroyed by Reformers 14 June 1599 dissolved or secularised 1567, granted to the municipality of St Andrews by Queen Mary 17 April 1567	The Assumption and Coronation of the Blessed Virgin Mary ____________________; Blackfriars Chapel	56°20′20″N 2°47′53″W
St Andrew's Cathedral Priory		Celtic monks founded before 747; Culdees founded 9th/10thC cathedral founded 908; Augustinian Canons Regular cathedral priory founded 1144, and endowed by Robert, Bishop of St Andrews; dissolved or secularised 1592, erected into a temporal lordship for the duke, in parliament 1592, 1606 (HS)	The Cathedral and Priory Church of Saint Andrew, Saint Andrews ____________________; Cennrigmonaid	56°20′24″N 2°47′15″W
St Andrew's Greyfriars		Observant Franciscan Friars founded between 1463 and 1466 by James Kennedy, Bishop of St Andrew's, purported (spurious) papal bull of Pius II of foundation 24 November 1458; burned by Norman Lesilie July 1547; dissolved or secularised 1559–1567; resigned to the magistrates 18 May 1559; destroyed by Reformers on or c. 14 June 1559; granted to the Burgh of St Andrew's by Queen Mary 17 April 1567		
St Andrew's Red Friars	purported Trinitarians — fictitious house			
St Andrew's Whitefriars		asserted Carmelite Friars founded 1370 by 'Bishop William de Laverdale' [sic] (possibly William de Landallis); — uncertain foundation		
St Ninian's Blackfriars	Dominican Blackfriars (Note: St Ninian's Blackfriars — Extracta e Variis Cronicis Scocie (Abbotsford Club 1842) p.249) erroneous reference to St Monan's			
St Monan's Blackfriars ^{+}		church founded as a chapel 3 April 1370 by David II; Dominican Friars refounded 15 November 1471 by James III; conventual status by bull of Sixtus IV procured by the vicar-general and the king 18 March 1476/7; incorporated into St Andrews Michaelmas 1519; secularised c. 1567	The Friary Church of Saint Monan, Saint Monan's ____________________ erroneously 'St Ninians'	56°12′12″N 2°46′16″W
St Rule's Priory		Augustinian Canons Regular — from Scone founded 1133–1144 (HS)	The Priory Church of Saint Rule, Saint Andrews	56°20′23″N 2°47′11″W

The following locations in the Fife Region have no monastic connection:

- Crawford Priory: mansion, built 1813
- Inchrye Abbey: mansion, built 19thC

Return to top of page

=== City of Glasgow ===
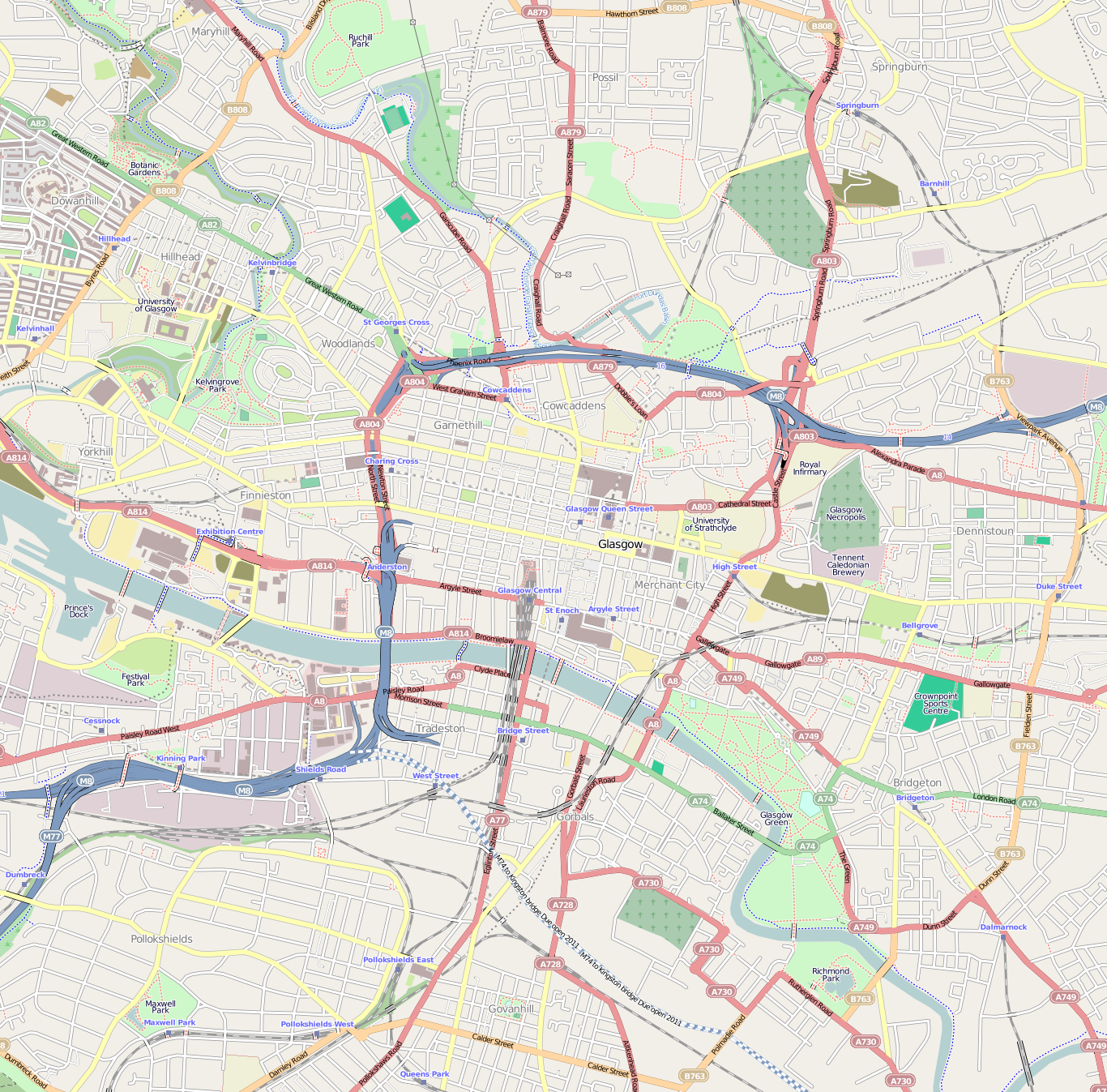
Locations of monastic houses in Glasgow

Foundation	Image	Communities & provenance	Formal name or dedication & alternative names	References & location
Glasgow Austin Friars ?		Augustinian Friars? church founded by laymen, granted to three hermits of the order in the Glasgow diocese c. 1453 — unidentified foundation		
Glasgow Blackfriars ^{#}		Dominican Friars founded before 1246, purportedly by the bishop and chapter, papal bull of Innocent IV 10 July 1246 granted indulgence to those contributing to the building of the church; secularised 1566/7; granted by Mary, Queen of Scots to the University of Glasgow and served as a parish church 16 March 1566/7; conventual church destroyed by fire c. 1670; rebuilt 1699-1702; demolished when the university re-located in the 1870s	St John the Evangelist ____________________; Old College Church	55°51′31″N 4°14′25″W
Glasgow Franciscan Friary		Franciscan Friars	Roman Catholic Church of Saint Luke; Blessed John Duns Franciscan Friary	55°50′59″N 4°14′47″W
Glasgow Greyfriars ^{#}		Observant Franciscan Friars founded 1473-9 (1477, 1472), mistakenly attributed to the archbishop; dissolved or secularised 1566/7	Church of The Blessed Virgin Mary	55°51′38″N 4°14′32″W
Glasgow Dominican Priory	Dominican nuns proposed foundation: bequeathal by Roland Blacadyr — foundation never implemented		St Catherine of Siena	
Govan Monastery		traditionally founded late 6thC by Constantine — evidence lacking		

Return to top of page

=== Highland ===
Locations of monastic houses in Highland

Foundation	Image	Communities & provenance	Formal name or dedication & alternative names	References & location
Applecross Monastery		Celtic monks founded 673 by Mael-rubai, Abbot of Bangor	St Maelrubha's Monastery	57°26′42″N 5°48′44″W
Beauly Priory		Valliscaulian monks — from Val des Choux dependent on Val des Choux; founded 1230; dissolved 1510; Cistercian monks founded 1510 on the suppression of the Valliscaulian order; purportedly erected to a temporal lordship for Lord Hay of Sala 1612, (apparently erroneously noted); granted to the Bishop of Ross (charter 20 October 1634) (HS)	The Priory Church of The Blessed Virgin Mary and Saint John the Baptist, Beauly	57°29′05″N 4°27′27″W
Cromarty Red Friars		purported Trinitarians no evidence of Trinitarian foundation here	Crenach ?	
Dornoch Cell ?		Benedictine monks founded before early 12thC; possible community established from Dunfermline or earlier community already established here		
Dornoch Red Friars		asserted Trinitarians founded 1271 by Sir Patrick Murray or the Reguli of Sutherland supposed house – evidence lacking – probably fictitious		
Eigg Monastery		founded before 617 by St Donnan	Kildonnan Monastery	56°53′16″N 6°08′21″W
Fearn Abbey		Premonstratensian Canons daughter house of Whithorn; founded 1221-2 (or c. 1227 at Old Fearn); dissolved 1609	The Abbey Church of Saint Ninian, Fearn	57°46′12″N 3°57′23″W
Fort Augustus Abbey		built as a military fort, Benedictine abbey and school in 20thC, now in private ownership		57°08′41″N 4°40′36″W
Inverness Blackfriars		Dominican Friars founded after 1214 and before 1240 by Alexander II; secularised before 19 January 1566/7; destroyed by Cromwell, masonry used in the construction of a citadel at the north of the town	St Bartholomew	57°28′50″N 4°13′48″W
Inverness Greyfriars		confusion with Inverness Blackfriars		57°28′50″N 4°13′48″W
Kingussie Whitefriars ^{#}		Carmelite Friars founded before 1501 by George, Earl of Huntly; dissolved or secularised after 1560	St Columba's Friary	57°04′52″N 4°03′09″W
Murkle Priory		nuns of uncertain order — supposed foundation – unverified	Glosters Priory	
North Rona Monastery		7thC		
Old Fearn Abbey		Premonstratensian Canons founded c. 1227		57°51′43″N 4°19′04″W approx

Return to top of page

=== Lanarkshire ===
==== South Lanarkshire ====
Locations of monastic houses in Lanarkshire

Foundation	Image	Communities & provenance	Formal name or dedication & alternative names	References & location
Blantyre Priory		Augustinian Canons Regular cell dependent on Jedburgh founded between 1238 and 1249 by Patrick (II), Earl of Dunbar and his wife Euphemia; dissolved or secularised 1598/9		55°48′39″N 4°05′55″W
Culter Preceptory	Knights Templar — no such house – confusion with Maryculter (v. supra)			
Lanark Greyfriars		Franciscan Friars Minor, Conventual founded 11 November 1328 and 15 May 1329 (Note: Lanark Greyfriars — foundation 1328-9: spurious charter of foundation cited by Manuscript collections of Father Marianus Brockie (Scottish Catholic Archives, Edinburgh), p.1459) (? between 27 March 1325 and 26 March 1326), site and endowments granted by Robert I who projected the foundation; probably founded by David II who obtained papal bull of Clement VI 29 November 1346; (Note: Lanark Greyfriars — W. Moir Bryce, The Scottish Grey Friars (Edinburgh, 1909), ii, p.149; Reg, Aven, 88, folios 191-IV) leased to James Lockhart of Lee prior to dissolution (date unknown); dissolved or secularised before 1566 (date abandoned unknown, though masonry being removed before 1566)		55°40′25″N 3°46′53″W
Lesmahagow Priory		Tironensian monks — from Kelso dependent on Kelso; founded 1144, church and lands granted to Kelso by David I and John, Bishop of Glasgow; dissolved 1607	The Priory Church of Saint Malo, Lesmahagow	55°38′16″N 3°53′08″W
Nunnery Priory	nuns of unspecified order — no foundation existed here			

Return to top of page

=== Lothian ===
==== East Lothian ====
Locations of monastic houses in East Lothian

Foundation	Image	Communities & provenance	Formal name or dedication & alternative names	References & location
Dirleton Red Friars		Trinitarians chapel of St Andrew's founded by the ancestors of Patrick, Lord Haliburton; recorded as Trinitarian 1507; annexed to the Crown before 1 August 1588		56°02′14″N 2°47′18″W
Dunbar Priory		Trinitarians founded 1240-8 (1218); granted to secular chaplain 8 March 1528/9; revoked 1 July 1529; dissolved 1529	The Priory Church of the Holy Trinity, Dunbar	56°00′05″N 2°31′05″W
Dunbar Whitefriars?		Carmelite Friars purportedly founded 1263 by Patrick, Earl of March supposed foundation – foundation references spurious, later references possible confusion with Trinitarian house		
Elbottle Priory		Cistercian nuns cell of South Berwick; supposed foundation – evidence lacking		
Fidra Priory		Premonstratensian Canons supposed house island granted to Dryburgh by William de Vaux; canons of Dryburgh serving at the church of St Nicholas c. 1220 described as a chantry c. 1240	Elbottle Priory	56°04′21″N 2°47′03″W
Gullane Priory		Cistercian nuns cell of South Berwick; allegedly founded by David I; supposed foundation – evidence lacking	Golyn Priory	
Haddington Austin Friars	Augustinian Friars erroneous reference to Augustinian Canons of St Andrews			
Haddington Austin Friars		Augustinian Friars hospital suppressed in favour of Austin Friars, and house built, though occupation never occurred and the house was conferred to Walter Ramsay, Chaplain to James V — incomplete foundation		
Haddington Blackfriars		Dominican Friars founded 1471; dissolved or secularised 1489 to after 1490; unsubstantiated claims of destroyed by the English and reduced to ashes 'by the rage of fanatics' c. 1558 (Note: Haddington Blackfriars — destruction: Manuscript collections of Father Marianus Brockie (Scottish Catholic Archives, Edinburgh), p.1236)		55°56′51″N 2°47′09″W
Haddington Greyfriars		Franciscan Friars founded 1242; destroyed 1356	Lucerna Laudoniae or Lamp of Lothian	55°57′18″N 2°46′24″W
Haddington Priory		Cistercian nuns founded before 1159 by Ada, Countess of Northumberland and Huntingdon; dissolved or secularised 1621; erected into a temporal lordship for John Maitland, master of Lauderdale 1621		
Houston Red Friars		Trinitarians founded c. 1270 by Cristiana, widow of Sir Roger Mubray (or purportedly c. 1226 by Hugh, Lord of Houston (Note: Houston Red Friars — foundation date c. 1220 given by Father R. A. Hay, Diplomatum Veterum Collectio (MS. 34-1.10 in the National Library of Scotland), iii, p.576; J. Spottiswoode, An account of all the Religious Houses that were in Scotland at the time of the Reformation p.396 (included in R. Keith, An Historical Catalogue of the Scottish Bishops, Edinburgh, 1824)), who located the foundation in Renfrewshire)), confirmed 26 January 1271/2 by Alexander III; possibly adjunct to, or identical with Houston hospital; commonly (erroneously) located in Renfrewshire; dissolved 1531; annexed to Peebles, confirmed by charter 8 January 1541/2	The Grace of God	
Luffness Red Friars	purported Trinitarians purportedly founded 1285 by an earl of Dunbar; confusion with Carmelite house at Fail			
Luffness Whitefriars		Carmelite Friars founded before 1293; dissolved after 1560; leased by the Crown 4 January 1609		56°00′40″N 2°50′53″W
Nunraw Abbey *		Cistercian monks — from Roscrea, Ireland; cell of Haddington; founded 1946	Sancta Maria Abbey, Nunraw	55°55′19″N 2°39′04″W
Nunraw Priory	supposed Cistercian nuns — no evidence of nunnery here			
North Berwick Priory		Cistercian nuns founded c. 1150 by Duncan (I), Earl of Fife who granted land (also attributed to Malcolm, Earl of Fife); granted to Mariot Cockburn 30 June 1566; granted to Margaret Hume 7 August 1568; ruinous by 1587; dissolved or secularised 1587/8; resigned by Margaret Hume to Alexander Hume 20 March 1587/8: church and cloister site granted by James VI		56°03′20″N 2°43′50″W
Papple Priory	nuns of unspecified order land held by Cistercians of St Bothan's and Haddington — no evidence of monastic foundation			
St Germains Preceptory	Knights Templar given as Templars' house, (Note: St Germains Preceptory — J. Spottiswoode, An account of all the Religious Houses that were in Scotland at the time of the Reformation (included in R. Keith, An Historical Catalogue of the Scottish Bishops (Edinburgh, 1824)), p.435) actually a Bethlehemite Hospital			
Trefontain Priory		Cistercian nuns cell of South Berwick; founded by David I; lands granted to the collegiate church of Douglass; supposed foundation	Trefountain Priory; Trefontaynes Priory	
Tyninghame Monastery		traditionally founded before 756 by Baldred; destroyed by the Norse 941		

Return to top of page

==== West Lothian ====
Locations of monastic houses in West Lothian

Foundation	Image	Communities & provenance	Formal name or dedication & alternative names	References & location
Abercorn Monastery		Celtic monks probably founded between 635 and 663; dissolved after early 8thC (purportedly still extant 854)		55°59′46″N 3°28′27″W
Kirkliston Preceptory		Knights Hospitaller founded 1560; annexed to Torphichen soon before 31 March 1513		
Linlithgow Austin Friars		Augustinian Friars royal benefactions between September and December 1503, no evidence of habitation – incomplete foundation; subsequent attempt to found settlement at Manuel (v. infra)		
Linlithgow Blackfriars		Dominican Blackfriars (Note: included in Dumfries list) foundation and founder unknown (Note: Linlithgow Blackfriars — Manuscript collections of Father Marianus Brockie (Scottish Catholic Archives, Edinburgh), p.1219 – probably spurious charter of John, King of Scots 19 March 1294/5)		
Linlithgow Whitefriars		Carmelite Friars founded c. 1401; dissolved before 1567/8		55°58′18″N 3°35′55″W
Manuel Austin Friars		Augustinian Friars provision for suppression of Cistercian nunnery (see immediately below) by the Pope 16 June 1506, on petition by James IV, never implemented — incomplete foundation		
Manuel Priory		Cistercian nuns founded 1156 (before 1164) by Malcolm IV, confirmed by William the Lion between 1166 and 1171; dissolved or secularised after 1599; probably passed into the possession of Alexander, Lord Livingstone, for whom the lease was renewed by James VI 13 April 1599	Emanuel Nunnery; Manuel Nunnery	55°58′10″N 3°38′57″W
Torphichen Preceptory ^{+}		Knights Hospitaller founded between c. 1144 and 1153 by David I who granted land; secularised 1563/4; land and baronies granted to praeceptor James, Lord St John by Queen Mary 25 January 1563/4		55°56′05″N 3°39′08″W

Return to top of page

==== Midlothian ====
Locations of monastic houses in Midlothian

Foundation	Image	Communities & provenance	Formal name or dedication & alternative names	References & location
Balantrodoch Preceptory		Knights Templar founded 1128-53; suppressed c. 1309	Temple	
Newbattle Abbey		Cistercian monks — from Melrose daughter house of Melrose; founded 1140, regarded as by David I, endowments by David and his son, Earl Henry; dissolved 1560; granted to Mark Ker, son of the Commendator, also Mark Ker) 7 April 1567, confirmed 24 August 1584, after the death of his father; erected into a temporal lordship for Mark Ker (charter 1587)	The Abbey Church of Saint Mary, Newbattle	55°52′49″N 3°04′13″W
Soutra Red Friars		asserted Trinitarians — unfounded assertion		

Return to top of page

=== Moray ===
Locations of monastic houses in Moray
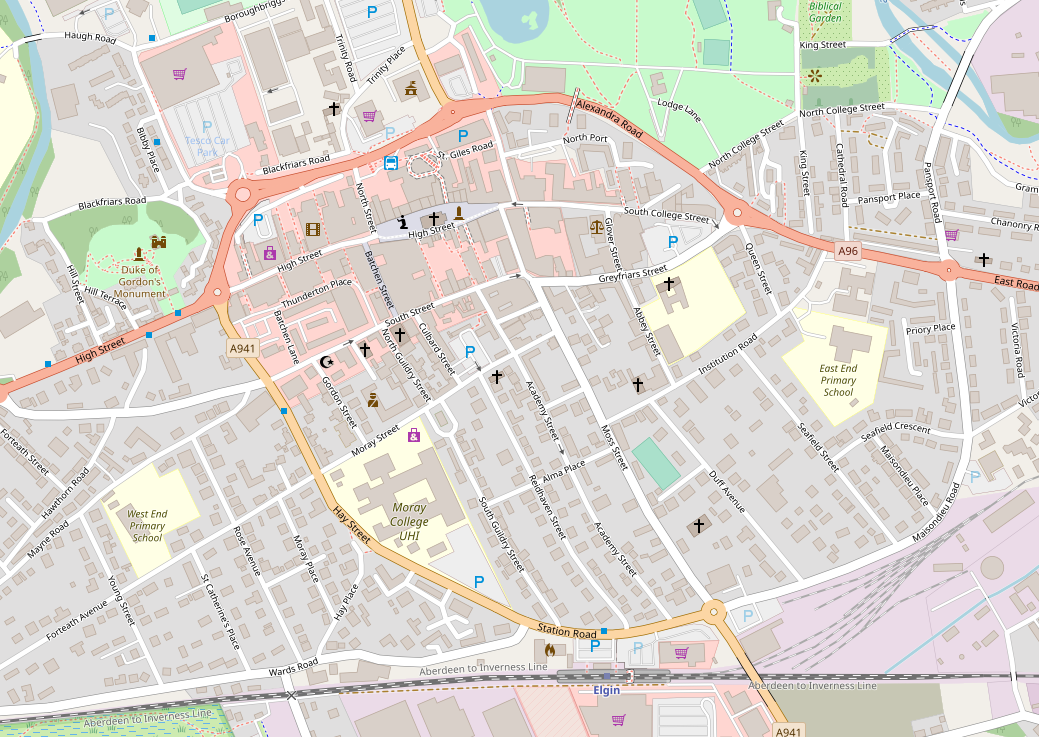
Locations of monastic houses in Elgin

Foundation	Image	Communities & provenance	Formal name or dedication & alternative names	References & location
Elgin Blackfriars		Dominican Friars founded 1233 or 1234 by King Alexander II; lands and revenues apparently permanently under Dunbar family at the Reformation; secularised 1570/1; Alexander Dunbar, dean of Moray received crown confirmation 7 January 1570/1, property granted under Great Seal 4 March 1573/4 and 9 January 1575/6	St James	57°38′58″N 3°19′21″W
Elgin Greyfriars		Franciscan Friars Minor, Conventual land granted by William, Earl of Ross c. 1281; foundation incomplete		57°38′55″N 3°18′37″W
Elgin Greyfriars, Observants		Observant Franciscan Friars founded before 1494, allegedly by John Innes of Innes; dissolved or secularised c. 1559; lands leased to Robert Innes of Invermarky by James VI 20 April 1573; restored; now in use by adjacent convent	Observantine House of The Franciscan Friars	57°38′53″N 3°18′35″W
Elgin Whitefriars ?		Carmelite Friars probable confusion with Greyfriars		
Forres Blackfriars		supposed Dominican Friars (Note: Forres Blackfriars — included in Dumfries list) — evidence lacking		
Kinloss Abbey		Cistercian monks — from Melrose daughter house of Melrose; founded 21 May 1150 by David I; dissolved 1560; secularised 1601, erected into a temporal lordship for Edward Bruce, becoming Lord Kinloss (charters 1601, 1608)	The Abbey Church of the Blessed Virgin Mary, Kinloss	57°38′02″N 3°33′59″W
Pluscarden Abbey *		Valliscaulian monks — from Val des Choux priory 1230; Benedictine monks dependent on Dunfermline; dissolved 1587, united with Urquhart; Benedictine monks priory, now Benedictine abbey	The Abbey Church of Saint Andrew, Pluscarden	57°36′02″N 3°26′15″W
Urquhart Priory ^{#}		Benedictine monks — from Dunfermline dependent on Dunfermline; founded 1124, reputedly by David I who made a grant made between 1130 and 1150; Pluscarden united with Urquhart; took formal possession of Pluscarden 8 November 1454; community settled at Pluscarden due to the extent of the buildings there; no remains on site, stone cross from priory incorporated into the wall of current parish church hall	The Priory Church of the Holy Trinity, Urquhart	57°38′53″N 3°11′36″W site 57°39′13″N 3°12′00″W vestiges

Return to top of page

=== Orkney ===
Locations of monastic houses in Orkney

Foundation	Image	Communities & provenance	Formal name or dedication & alternative names	References & location
Brough of Birsay Monastery		possible Celtic monks monastic settlement 6thC suggested to have connection with the name of St Colum or St Columba; Viking farmstead 9thC; cathedral early 12thC, foundation unknown; see translated to Kirkwall 12thC; church probably in parochial use until 13thC; episcopal residence in use to 14thC	St Peter's Monastery	59°08′12″N 3°19′49″W
Brough of Birsay Red Friars		alleged Trinitarians (Note: 'Brough of Birsay Red Friars': Reports of the Royal Commission on Ancient and Historical Monuments and Constructions of Scotland, Orkney and Shetlands (Edinburgh, 1909-), ii, I, p.3) — order unconfirmed		
Eynhallow Monastery ^{#}		possible site of monastic settlement 12thC; evidently ceased well before 16thC		59°08′29″N 3°07′19″W
Golgotha Monastery *, Papa Stronsay		Transalpine Redemptorists transferred from Joinville, France; island purchased 31 May 1999; extant		59°08′56″N 2°35′18″W
Hichaten Priory		Cistercian monks supposed foundation — no such location identified in the Orkneys	Hichaten vel Orcades	
Transalpine Redemptorists		possible Papari or Pictish monks founded 8thC?		59°08′53″N 2°34′45″W

Return to top of page

=== Perth & Kinross ===
Locations of monastic houses in Perth & Kinross
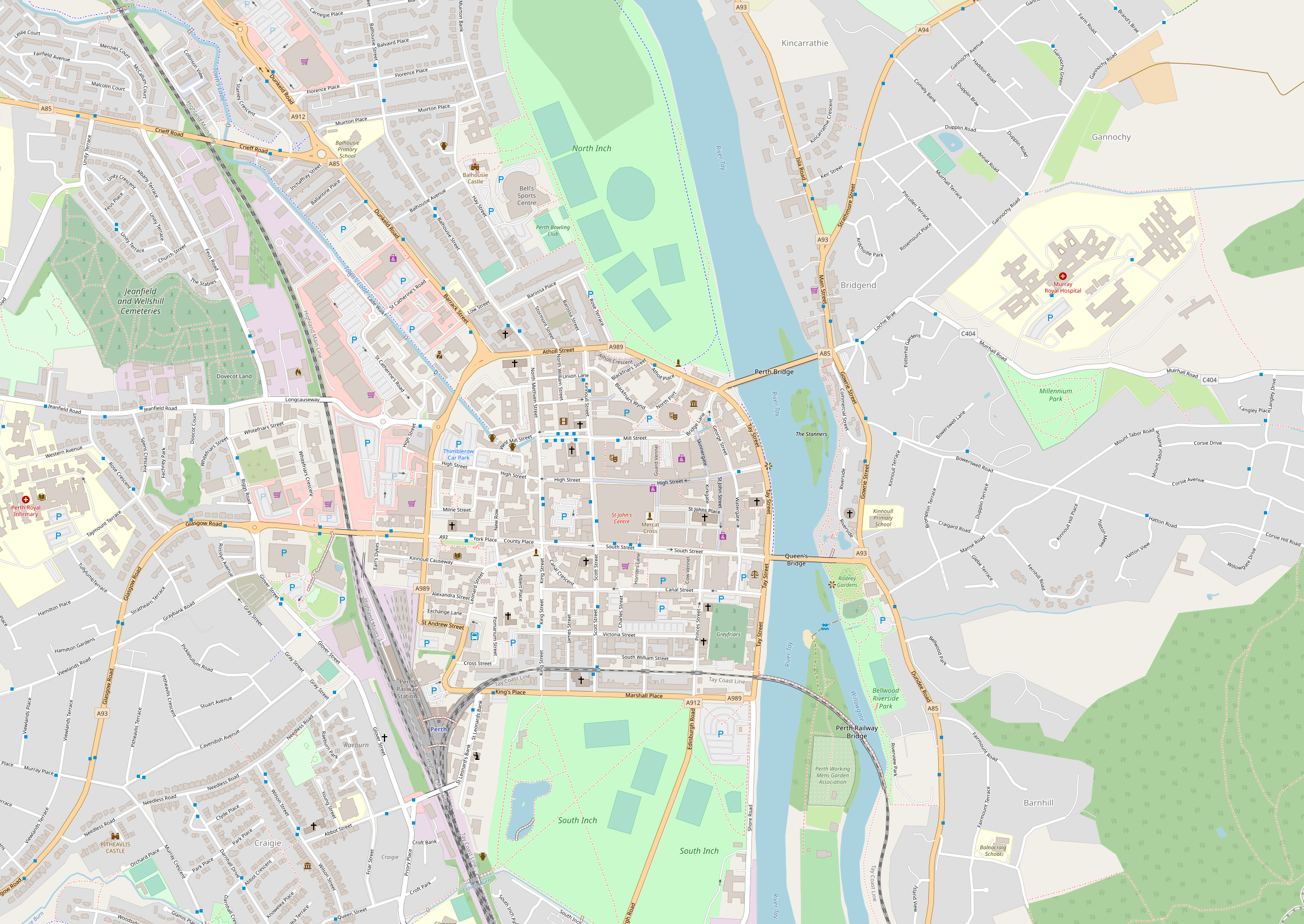
Locations of monastic houses in Perth

Foundation	Image	Communities & provenance	Formal name or dedication & alternative names	References & location
Abernethy Priory		Culdees founded c. 6thC by Nechtan, King of the Picts; possible cathedral; Augustinian Canons Regular founded 1272 or 1273; dissolved or secularised early 14thC, erroneously attributed to George, Earl of Angus c.1450; secular canons collegiate founded	The Priory Church of Saint Mary, Saint Bridget and Saint Abrinca St Bride	56°20′00″N 3°18′43″W
Aberuthven 'Cell'	church granted to the 'brethren' at Inchafray c. 1198; asserted cell of Inchafray granted to the Augustinian Canons Regular at Inchafray c. 1200; remained a parochial church rather than a cell			56°19′02″N 3°39′40″W
Coupar Angus Abbey		Cistercian monks — from Melrose founded 1161/64, planned by Malcolm IV on the advice of Waltheof of Melrose; abbot appointed 12 July 1164; dissolved 1560; granted to Andrew Lamb 24 March 1603; granted to Patrick Sterling 20 May 1607; secularised 1606; erected into a temporal lordship for James Elphinstone, thereafter Lord Coupar; Lamb resigned the claim 24 January 1607	The Abbey Church of The Blessed Virgin Mary, Coupar Angus	56°32′39″N 3°15′59″W
Coupar Angus Blackfriars		Dominican Friars (Note: Coupar Angus Blackfriars — listed by J. Spottiswoode, History of the Church of Scotland (1677), p.16 (25)) founded c. 1480, probably by Thomas, commendator-abbot of Coupar and dean of Dunkeld (Note: Coupar Angus Blackfriars — foundation: foundation date and founder unknown: Manuscript collections of Father Marianus Brockie, Scottish Catholic Archives, Edinburgh, suggested founder (p.1241), suggested date (p.1248))		
Dalvey Cell		Valliscaulian monks supposed cell dependent on Pluscarden; evidence lacking — considered conjectural		
Dron Priory		Cistercian monks supposed foundation purportedly dependent on Coupar Angus — dubious		56°27′26″N 3°07′24″W
Dull Priory		suggested house of Tironensian monks, references apparently erroneous		
Dunkeld Monastery		built before 849 by Kenneth mac Alpin		56°33′54″N 3°35′23″W
Elcho Priory		Cistercian nuns founded before 1241, attributed to David Lindsay I; dissolved or secularised 1610; erected into a temporal lordship for Lord Scone (later Viscount Stormont)	Elcho Nunnery; Orchardnook	56°22′49″N 3°23′31″W
Forfar Abbey	Cistercian monks — erroneous reference to Coupar Angus			
Forfar Greyfriars		supposed Franciscan Friars Minor, Conventual erroneous reference (Note: Forfar Greyfriars — Calendar of Documents relating to Scotland, ed. J. Bain (Edinburgh, 1881-8) (ii, no. 856) includes reference to such a house; Documents Illustrative of the History of Scotland 1286-1306, ed. J. Stevenson (Edinburgh, 1870) (ii, no. cccclxxxiv, 23 November 1297) shows this to be erroneous)		
Inchaffray Abbey		community of brethren foundation unknown; Augustinian Canons Regular priory founded c. 1200 by Gilbert, Earl of Strathearn, granted to Scone; raised to abbey status 1220 or 1221; dissolved or secularised 1609-69, erected into temporal lordship 31 January 1609, established 15 February 1669	The Abbey Church of Saint John the Evangelist and Saint Mary, Inchaffray	56°23′00″N 3°41′45″W
Kinkell 'Cell'	Augustinian Canons Regular asserted cell of Inchaffray; actually parochial church			
Kinkell Commandery		Knights Hospitaller — traditional – no evidence		
Loch Tay Priory		Augustinian Canons Regular — from Scone uncertain foundation; island granted to Scone by Alexander I 1122	The Priory Church of Saint Mary, Loch Tay	56°35′02″N 4°00′37″W
Methven Monastery		secular priests founded between 1214 and 1223?		
Montrose Blackfriars		Dominican Friars founded 1230, purportedly by Sir Alan Durward; apparently abandoned after being destroyed 14thC; secularised 1570/1, revenues granted to the Burgh of Montrose by James VI 1 January 1570/1	The Nativity of the Blessed Virgin Mary ____________________; Blackfriars Hospital	56°42′48″N 2°28′38″W
Muthill Monastery		Culdees founded between 1178 and 1195; dissolved by 1236		
Perth Blackfriars		Dominican Friars founded before 1240 (purportedly 1231) by Alexander II; secularised 1569, lands and revenues granted to the Burgh of Perth by James VI 9 August 1569	St Andrew	56°23′55″N 3°25′51″W
Perth Greyfriars		Observant Franciscan Friars founded before 1496, purported (spurious) papal bull of Pius II 26 July 1460 confirming building by Sir Laurence of Oliphant of Aberdelgie (erroneous reference to 1358 foundation is evidently the Blackfriars' house) dissolved or secularised 1559-60, destroyed by Reformers 1559; site became a cemetery 1580		
Perth Charterhouse		Carthusian monks founded 1429, proposed by James I, authorised by the Prior of Grande Chartreuse 19 August 1426, consent of the General Chapter; dissolved or secularised 1569; possession passed to the Town Council 1602	Vale of Virtue Priory	56°23′25″N 3°26′22″W
Perth, St Leonard's Priory		Augustinian Canonesses founded 13th century; annexed to Perth Charterhouse (see immediately above) c. 1434	St Leonard ____________________; St Leonard's Priory and Hospital	56°23′26″N 3°26′22″W
Rindalgros Monastery?		Benedictine monks dependent on Reading, Berkshire; founded 1147-53(?), granted to Reading by David I; monastic community located here, though possibly no monastery was built either transferred to Isle of May before 1151 or merged with Isle of May after 1151; held by Isle of May 1231	Rhynd Monastery; Rindelgros Monastery	56°21′52″N 3°22′25″W
St Serf's Inch Priory, St Serf's Inch, Loch Leven		Culdees founded before 842, traditionally by Brude mac Dergard, King of the Picts – more likely by Brude mac Ferat; Augustinian Canons Regular dependent on St Andrews; founded 1152/3 (c. 1150); dissolved or secularised 1580; now within an island nature reserve usually without public access (HS)	Portmoak Priory; Portmoakso Priory; Loch Leven Priory; St Serf's Priory; St Serf's Island Priory	56°11′15″N 3°21′09″W
Scone Abbey		Culdees or Columban monks evidence lacking; Augustinian Canons Regular — from Nostell (?re)founded c. 1120 purportedly by Alexander I	The Abbey Church of the Holy Trinity, The Blessed Virgin Mary, Saint Laurence, Saint Augustine and Saint Michael, Scone	56°25′22″N 3°25′56″W
Scotlandwell Red Friars		originally hospital of St Mary; Trinitarians granted by David de Bernham, Bishop of St Andrews 2 January 1250/1; secularised before 1591/2		56°11′58″N 3°18′44″W
Tullilum Whitefriars		Carmelite Friars founded 1262, chapel granted by Richard, Bishop of Dunkeld; dissolved or secularised after 1559; purportedly destroyed by Reformers 1559; granted to Patrick Murray of Tibbermore, confirmed by the Crown 23 June 1565 (Note: Tullilum Whitefriars — Registrum Secreti Sigilli Regnum Scotorum, ed. M. Livingstone and others (Edinburgh, 1908— ), V, no.2124)	Perth Whitefriars; Tulliburn Whitefriars; The White Chapel (nave)	56°23′53″N 3°26′44″W

Return to top of page

=== Renfrewshire ===
Locations of monastic houses in Renfrewshire

Foundation	Image	Communities & provenance	Formal name or dedication & alternative names	References & location
Inchinnan Monastery		traditionally a monastic settlement		
Inchinnan 'Preceptory'	Knights Templar no house – parochial church held by the Templars, and later the Hospitallers; North Bar House on site			55°53′33″N 4°25′51″W
Paisley Abbey ^{+}		Cluniac monks — from Wenlock, Shropshire priory founded c. 1169 (1163); raised to abbey status 1219 (1245); dissolved 1587; (CS)	The Abbey Church of saints Mary, James, Mirin and Milburga	55°50′42″N 4°25′13″W
Renfrew Priory		Cluniac monks — from Cluny founded c. 1163; dissolved between 1169 and 1173		55°52′23″N 4°22′53″W

Return to top of page

=== Scottish Borders ===
Locations of monastic houses in Scottish Borders

Foundation	Image	Communities & provenance	Formal name or dedication & alternative names	References & location
Ancrum Preceptory		Knights Hospitaller purported preceptory or hospital - conjectural (secular foundation at Ancrum Spittal)		
Ancrum Red Friars		Trinitarians supposed house (Note: Ancrum Red Friars — Geographical Collections relating to Scotland made by Walter Macfarlane (SHS, 1906-08), iii, p.158) — evidence lacking		
Berwick Austin Friars	Formerly located in Scotland until Capture of Berwick (1482). See List of monastic houses in Northumberland			
Berwick Blackfriars	Formerly located in Scotland until Capture of Berwick (1482). See List of monastic houses in Northumberland			
Berwick Greyfriars	Formerly located in Scotland until Capture of Berwick (1482). See List of monastic houses in Northumberland			
Berwick Priory	Formerly located in Scotland until Capture of Berwick (1482). See List of monastic houses in Northumberland			
Berwick Red Friars	Formerly located in Scotland until Capture of Berwick (1482). See List of monastic houses in Northumberland			
Berwick Friars of the Sack	Formerly located in Scotland until Capture of Berwick (1482). See List of monastic houses in Northumberland			
Berwick Whitefriars	Formerly located in Scotland until Capture of Berwick (1482). See List of monastic houses in Northumberland			
Charterhouse	Carthusian monks no evidence of monastic house – probable interpretation of reference to Perth Charterhouse			
Coldingham Priory ^{+}		monks and nuns double house; founded before 661 and 664 by Ebba, daughter of King Æthelfrith of Northumbria; damaged by fire c. 683, and abandoned by most of the community; nuns dependent on Lindisfarne before 854; destroyed in raids by the Danes c. 870; Benedictine monks dependent on Durham; shire granted to Durham by King Edgar c. 1098; founded before 1139; dependent on Dunfermline 14th-15thC; monks evicted 1532, 1542 and 1544/5; destroyed in warfare by 4 February 1551/2; dissolved 1606; most of remaining buildings destroyed by Cromwell 1648; part of conventual church restored; now in parochial use	The Priory Church of Saint Mary, Saint Ebba and Saint Cuthbert, Coldingham	55°53′11″N 2°09′18″W
Coldstream Priory		Cistercian nuns founded before 1166 by Earl Gospatrick; dissolved or secularised 1621, erected into a temporal lordship for Sir John Hamilton of Trabroun		
Crail Priory		apocryphal establishment of nuns		
Eccles Priory		Cistercian nuns purportedly founded 1156 (or 1145 or 1155), attributed to Earl Gospatrick, or a countess of March (possibly Derdere, wife of Earl Gospatrick); dissolved or secularised 1609; erected into a temporal lordship of Sir George Hume 24 June 1609		
Dryburgh Abbey		Premonstratensian Canons — from Alnwick daughter house of Alnwick; founded 1150; dissolved or secularised 1606; (HS)	The Abbey Church of Saint Mary, Dryburgh	55°34′38″N 2°38′58″W
Fogo Priory		Tironensian monks — from Kelso dependent on Kelso; founded between 1259 and 1297, church of St Nicholas granted to Kelso by Patrick Corbet; dissolution unknown		55°44′08″N 2°21′50″W
Jedburgh Abbey		land granted by Ecgred, Bishop of Lindisfarne c. 830; Augustinian Canons Regular — apparently from St-Quentin, Beauvais priory founded c. 1138 (1148) by David I with the assistance of John, Bishop of Glasgow; erroneously referred to as Cluniac in one manuscript; raised to abbey status c. 1154; dissolved or secularised 1696; (HS)	The Abbey Church of Saint Mary, Jedburgh	55°28′36″N 2°33′17″W
Jedburgh Blackfriars		locally but inaccurately cited Dominican Friars (Note: Jedburgh Blackfriars — included in Dumfries lists) (Note: Jedburgh Blackfriars — Watson, History of the Franciscan Friary of Jedburgh, HNBC, 1906, p.82)		55°28′48″N 2°33′12″W
Jedburgh Greyfriars		Observant Franciscan Friars founded before 1505; allegedly built 1513 by the nobles of the Border; dissolved or secularised unknown		
Kelso Abbey		Tironensian monks (community founded at Selkirk c. 1113); transferred from Selkirk in 1128; dissolved or secularised 1607; (HS)	The Abbey Church of Saint Mary and Saint John, Kelso	55°35′50″N 2°25′57″W
Makerstoun Charterhouse		Carthusian monks land granted to the Carthusians at Perth by Archibald, Earl of Douglas 2 February 1433/4; no evidence of monastic foundation		
Melrose Abbey		Cistercian monks — from Rievaulx/Holmcultram founded 1136/7 by David I; dissolved 1598; bestowed on James Stewart, Commendator of Kelso; secularised 1609, erected into a temporal lordship for John Ramsay, Viscount Haddington, becoming Lord Melrose; (HS)	The Abbey Church of Saint Mary and Saint John, Melrose	55°35′57″N 2°43′05″W
Old Melrose Monastery		Celtic monks possibly from Iona founded between 635 and 651; destroyed by Kenneth mac Alpin 839; under the bishops of Lindisfarne until 854; attempted refoundation by Aldwin of Jarrow; abandoned 1074; church of St Cuthbert founded; dependent on Durham until between 1124 and 1136; exchanged for the church at Berwick by King David I between 1124 and 1136; annexed to Cistercian monastery at Melrose	St Cuthbert's Chapel	55°35′52″N 2°39′20″W
Peebles Red Friars		Trinitarians church built after 9 May 1261, when cross of purported relics of 'St Nicholas the bishop' was found, motivating Alexander III to build a church; founded before 1296, when the master swore fealty to Edward I; friary apparently founded c. 1448 with the approval of the bailies; bailies claim to have expelled friars c. 1463, authorised by the Pope 21 April 1463; expulsion apparently not effected; new foundation consented by petition of James III and his queen, 3 February 1473/4; dissolved or secularised 1560/1; lands erected to barony for John Hay of Yester 3 February 1624; church in use until 1784	The Friary Church of the Holy Trinity, Peebles ____________________; The Cross Kirk; Holy Cross	55°39′15″N 3°11′33″W
Roxburgh Greyfriars		Franciscan Friars Minor, Conventual founded 1232 or 1232-4 by Alexander II; (Note: Roxburgh Greyfriars — foundation: probably spurious charter of foundation 18 October 1232 cited by Manuscript collections of Father Marianus Brockie (Scottish Catholic Archives, Edinburgh), pp.1281-2) destroyed: burned by the English 14 September 1454 (Note: Roxburgh Greyfriars — destruction: Letters and Papers, foreign and domestic of the reign of Henry VIII ed. by J. S. Brewer and others (London, 1864-1932), xx^{2} no. 456, 533) dissolved or secularised after 1547, evidently; partly re-roofed November 1547 and in use for English troops		55°35′46″N 2°26′44″W
Roxburgh Priory		purported Augustinian Canons Regular — probable confusion with Fransciscan friary		
Roxburgh Priory		Cistercian monks — unfounded assertion; (Note: Roxburgh — A. O. Anderson, Early Sources, ii, p.183, note, according to papal legate declaration, and referring to the exemption of the church of St James, synodal and episcopal aids: 'It seems, therefore, to have been occupied by Cistercian monks at this time') church of St James held by Kelso, the settlement of monks, or of Cistercians, is unsubstantiated		
St Bothan's Priory, Abbey St Bathans		Cistercian nuns founded 13thC (possibly during the reign of William the Lion) possibly by a countess of March, or by Ada, daughter of William the Lion, or Christina, wife of Earl Patrick, or Euphemia, wife of Patrick, Earl of Dunbar; leased to Alexander, Lord Home 16 June 1565/6; conferred on Elizabeth Hume 8 March 1565/6, demitted before 23 July 1617; granted to David Lindsay 23 July 1617; dissolved or secularised 1622, erected into a temporal lordship for David Lindsay	St Bathan's Priory	55°51′11″N 2°23′14″W
Selkirk Abbey		Tironensian monks — from Tiron founded c. 1113 by Earl David; transferred to Kelso c. 1128		
Selkirk Blackfriars		Dominican Blackfriars (Note: Selkirk Blackfriars — included in Dumfries lists) charter of James Tweedie of Drumelzier, 28 September 1358, granted site to build a new monastery on the instruction of King David II (Note: Selkirk Blackfriars — charter of dubious merit (purportedly bearing the seal of Alexander Maxwell, Archdeacon of 'Tuuedaliae' — if Tweedale: no such archdeaconry, if Teviotdale: no record of archdeacon of that name) cited by Manuscript collections of Father Marianus Brockie (Scottish Catholic Archives, Edinburgh), p.1242) — evidence lacking	St Ninian	

The following location in the Scottish Borders has no known monastic connection:

- Abbey: placename probably does not pre-date 1726

Return to top of page

=== Stirling ===
Locations of monastic houses in Stirling

Foundation	Image	Communities & provenance	Formal name or dedication & alternative names	References & location
Cambuskenneth Abbey		Augustinian Canons Regular — Arroasian — from Arroaise founded 1147 (HS)	The Abbey Church of Saint Mary, Cambuskenneth	56°07′24″N 3°55′03″W
Dunblane Monastery		early foundation, possible Culdees — unsubstantiated; cathedral founded before 1214–1223		56°11′22″N 3°57′54″W
Inchcailleoch Priory		nuns of unspecified order - traditional (assumed from the name of the island - purportedly "the island of old women"), parochial church — no evidence of monastic foundation		
Inchmahome Priory, Lake of Menteith		Augustinian Canons Regular independent priory founded 1238 by Walter, Earl of Menteith; dissolved or secularised 1604; erected into temporal lordship for John Erskine, Second Earl of Mar 1604 and 1606 (HS)		56°10′35″N 4°17′53″W
St Fillan's Priory		Augustinian Canons Regular — from Inchaffray founded 1317, land granted patronage of church of Killin to Inchafray by Robert I 26 February 1317/8; granted to Campbell of Glenorchy; revenues apparently granted to Archibald Campbell of Glencarradale by the Crown 19 March 1607	The Priory Church of Saint Fillan, St Fillan's ____________________; Strathfillan Priory; Strath Fillan Priory	56°25′09″N 4°39′42″W
Stirling Blackfriars		Dominican Friars founded before 1249 by Alexander II; purportedly destroyed by Reformers June 1559; putatively granted to Alexander Erskine of Cangnoir May 1560; secularised 1567, granted to the municipality of Stirling by Queen Mary 15 April 1567, though Erskine retained possession until 1652	St Laurence	56°07′10″N 3°56′12″W
Stirling Greyfriars		Observant Franciscan Friars founded 1494, allegedly by James IV; dissolved or secularised 1559-67; destroyed by Reformers 1559; granted to the magistrates 15 April 1567		

The following location in the Stirling Region has no monastic connection:

- Ross Priory: mansion named 'Ross', renamed 'Ross Priory' 1810

Return to top of page

=== Unidentified supposed foundations ===
Foundation	Image	Communities & provenance	Formal name or dedication & alternative names	References & location
Ancaria		Cistercian monks, mentioned 1530		
Crenach Red Friars		supposed Trinitarians, located in Cromarty (Highland Region), purportedly founded c. 1271 by Patrick Murray; possibly indicates Greenock, Renfrewshire (or Greenock, East Ayrshire), or Carnwath, Lanarkshire — no monastic house at those locations – probably fictitious	Crennach; Crenwathe	
Crusay		Augustinian Canons Regular, alleged foundation in the Western Isles, possible misreading of Oronsay		
Molista		nuns of unspecified order — suggested site of a house on the basis of the name: "the town (or house) of the black old women"		
Oggerstone Preceptory		Knights Templar given as fort and barony of Templars (Note: Oggerstone Preceptory — J. Spottiswoode, An account of all the Religious Houses that were in Scotland at the time of the Reformation (included in R. Keith, An Historical Catalogue of the Scottish Bishops (Edinburgh, 1824)), p.435) — actual reference to Ogerstone, Huntingdon, England (see List of monastic houses in Cambridgeshire)		
unlocated		Carthusian monks, petition by Archibald, Earl of Douglas, granted by the Pope 5 June 1419 supplication for licence to found a house; projected foundation never implemented		

Return to top of page

== See also ==
- List of country houses in the United Kingdom
- Hospitals in medieval Scotland
