= Greyfriars =

Greyfriars, Grayfriars or Gray Friars is a term for Franciscan Order of Friars Minor, in particular, the Conventual Franciscans. The term often refers to buildings or districts formerly associated with the order.

== Former Friaries ==
- Greyfriars, Bedford
- Greyfriars, Beverley, Yorkshire, England
- Greyfriars, Bristol
- Greyfriars, Canterbury, earliest English Franciscan friary
- Greyfriars, Coventry
- Greyfriars, Dorchester
- Greyfriars, Dunwich, dissolved in 1538 some ruins remain as a Scheduled Ancient Monument
- Greyfriars, Gloucester, the ruins of a monastery, also a street named after the same
- Greyfriars, Ipswich, founded before 1236, virtually nothing remains
- Greyfriars, King's Lynn, the tower survives and is a prominent local landmark
- Greyfriars, Lincoln, former Franciscan friary; only the infirmary now survives
- Greyfriars, Leicester, original burial place of Richard III of England
- Greyfriars, London
- GreyFriars, Newcastle-upon-Tyne, founded 1327, dissolved 1539; rebuilt as private residence, demolished 1832
- Greyfriars, Nottingham, founded 1224–1230, dissolved in 1539; nothing remains of the friary
- Greyfriars, Perth
- Greyfriars, Richmond
- Greyfriars, Shrewsbury
- Greyfriars, St Andrews, Fife, Scotland
- Greyfriars, Stamford
- Greyfriars, Winchelsea
- Greyfriars, Worcester
- Greyfriars, Stockholm

== Churches ==
- Christ Church Greyfriars, in London
- Greyfriars Church, Reading
- Greyfriars Kirk, Edinburgh

== Other ==
- Grey Friars F.C., former football club, c.1870-1880
- Greyfriars, Bristol (office block)
- Greyfriars Bobby, a renowned Edinburgh dog
- Greyfriars bus station, former bus station in Northampton
- Greyfriars Kirkyard, a graveyard in Edinburgh
- Greyfriars, Oxford, a former Permanent Private Hall of the University of Oxford
- Greyfriars, Preston, an electoral ward in Lancashire
- Greyfriars, Wanborough, a house in Surrey, England
- Greyfriars, Worcester, a Grade I listed building in Worcester, England

== In fiction ==
- Greyfriars School, a fictional school which is the setting for Frank Richards' Billy Bunter stories
