= Greyfriars Church =

Many churches have been named after the Grey Friars (Franciscans), and often they originated as Franciscan monasteries. Notable examples are:

- Greyfriars Kirk, Edinburgh
- Greyfriars Church, Leicester
- Greyfriars Church, Reading
- Greyfriars Church, Dumfries
- Greyfriars Church, Aberdeen
- Greyfriars Church, Auckland
