= Greyfriars Church, Auckland =

Historic church in Mount Eden, Auckland, New Zealand

Greyfriars Church
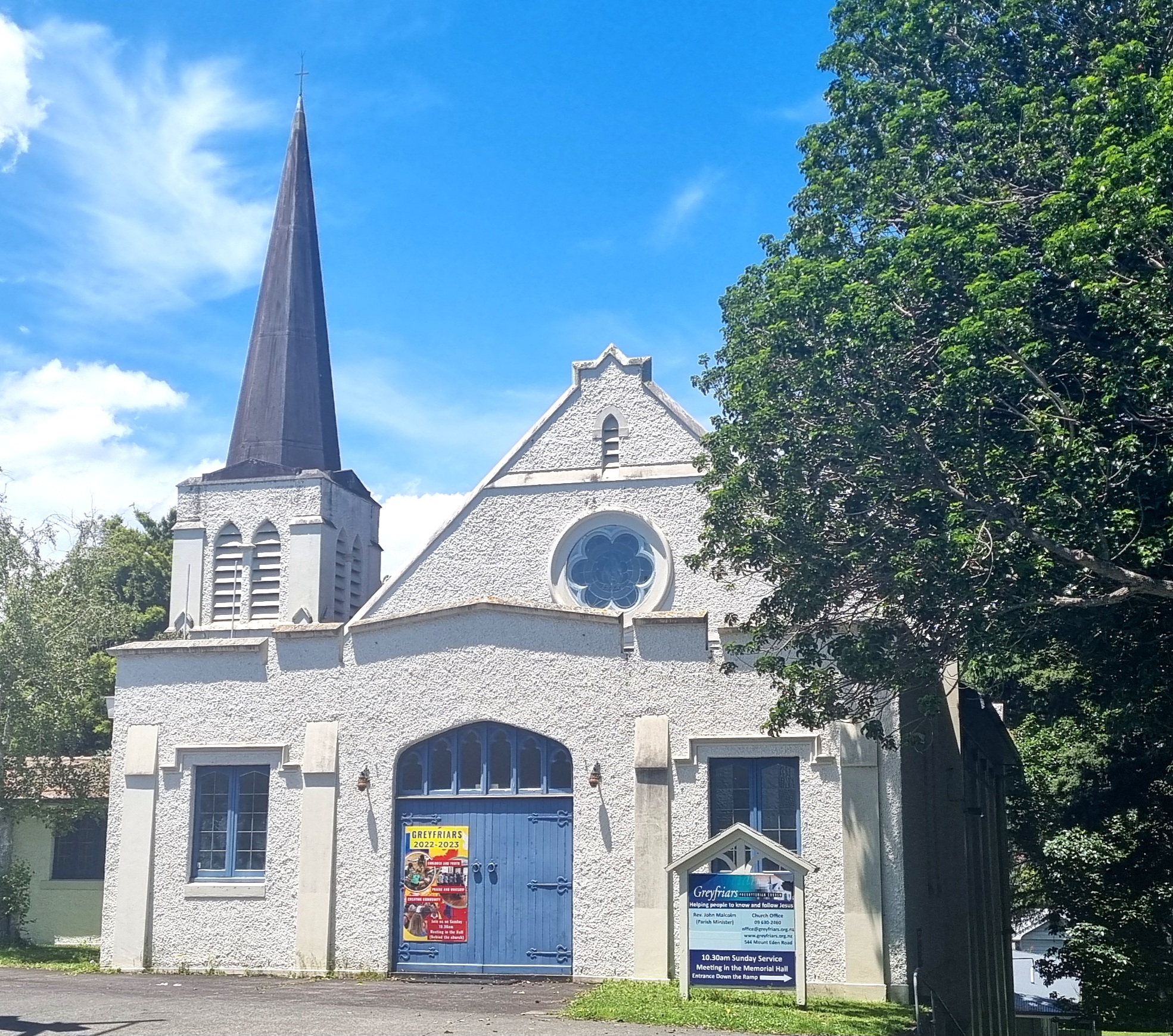
- Greyfriars Church
- Interactive map of the Greyfriars Church area
- Former names: Mt Eden Presbyterian Church

General information
- Architectural style: Arts and crafts
- Location: Mount Eden, 546-552 Mt Eden Road, Auckland, New Zealand
- Coordinates: 36°53′09″S 174°45′41″E
- Year built: 1916-1917
- Opened: 1917
- Renovated: 1958
- Affiliation: Presbyterian Church of New Zealand

Height
- Height: 63 ft (19 m)
- Antenna spire: 35 ft (11 m)

Technical details
- Material: Reinforced concrete

Design and construction
- Architect: Thomas Coulthard Mullions
- Developer: Archibald Grandison

Website
- https://www.greyfriars.org.nz/

Heritage New Zealand – Category 2
- Designated: 11 November 1981
- Reference no.: 513

Greyfriars Church, originally known as the Mt Eden Presbyterian Church, is an early 20th-century Presbyterian church located in Mount Eden, Auckland, New Zealand, listed as a Category 2 building by Heritage New Zealand.

== Description ==
Greyfriars Church is an Arts and crafts church constructed from reinforced concrete and cement plaster, with rimu being used for the interior.

== History ==
As Auckland expanded, areas that were previously farmland started becoming urban and would require their own church for services. In 1915 the Presbytery of Auckland decided to host evening services in the Masonic Hall on Woodside Road. These services proved popular and thus Mount Eden was given a home mission. Later the presbytery paid £2,200 to Archibald Grandison for a church that could seat 300. Thomas Mullions was the architect. The building was constructed from ferroconcrete. On 25 February 1917 it was officially opened by Reverend R. Scott West. Shortly after, on 12 April, Reverend J. W. Shaw was made the minister of the church.

In 1919 the church purchased a manse on Penrhyn Road for £1,450. In 1921 a Sunday school was operating out of the basement. Reverend Shaw resigned in 1921 due to ill health and on July 7, 1921, Reverend Leonard H. Hunt was made minister. Under Hunt, in 1928, a new Sunday school was constructed and a pipe organ was installed. In 1932 he resigned and left for Karori.

On March 16, 1933, Reverend E. J. Tipler was made minister. He died less than three years later on 10 October 1935. Reverend John A. Allan took his place from 14 May 1936 until later resigning in December 1937.

Reverend J. Douglas Smith became minister on 7 July 1938. Shortly after, World War II occurred and many congregation members would serve in the war. During the war and for sometime following it the church helped send food parcels to Britain and Europe. The church developed close ties with the Trinity Presbyterian Church, Plymouth from this. Once the need for food parcels had died down the church decided to build a memorial hall for congregation members that died during both the Second and First World Wars. £3,000 was raised for its construction and it was opened in 1952 at a cost of more than £11,000. This was in part funded by a gift of £16,000 from the estate of Susan Wilkie. She later received a memorial plaque on 11 April 1954. The church decided to begin restoration work the same year following completion of the memorial hall. During this period the memorial hall was used for services. Shortly after this Reverend Smith resigned.

Reverend Douglas Watt was made minister on 30 April 1953. In 1956 it was decided—due to growth—that the church be extended, a new pipe organ be installed, a new manse on the corner of St Leonards and Cedar Roads be built, and a new Sunday school would open in the parish. In 1963 all of these goals had been met. The church's plot was extended so a car park could be installed, a cloister was added that ran between the tower and the sacristy, the building was expanded to allow more seating, and a spire was erected on the top of the tower. The spire was 35 ft (11 m) high and increased the total height to 63 ft (19 m). In 1959 the congregation presented a petition requesting the church be given a formal name. A referendum was later held, the options were between St. Mark's and Greyfriars. Greyfriars won the vote and the church was formally named Greyfriars Presbyterian Church, Mount Eden.

In December, 2012 the church relocated services to the memorial hall after being identified as being at risk of collapse in event of a serious earthquake by Auckland Council. Seismic strengthening options have been too expensive for the congregation and as of 2024 the church building has remained unused.

In 2014 the congregation merged with the Epsom Presbyterian Church to become the Greyfriars Eden Epsom Presbyterian Church.
