= Blackfriars, Stirling =

13th century friary in Stirling, Scotland

Coordinates: 56°07′10″N 3°56′12″W

The Church of the Friars Preachers of St Laurence, Stirling, commonly called Blackfriars, was a mendicant friary of the Dominican Order founded in the 13th century at Stirling, Scotland.

== History ==
The Chronica Extracta and John Spottiswoode alleged that the Stirling Dominican house was founded by King Alexander II of Scotland (d. 1249). Spottiswoode was particularly specific, giving a foundation date of 1233. These dates are possible, but unconfirmed by contemporary evidence.

The Stirling Dominican friary lasted over three centuries. Robert Lindsay of Pitscottie claimed that it was destroyed by Protestants in June 1559, a claim partially confirmed in a document of 12 September 1559, which speaks of the ejection of the prior and the destruction of the house earlier in the year. The possessions of the friary went into the hands of Alexander Erskine of Cangnoir, though on 15 April 1567, Mary, Queen of Scots, granted the revenues of all religious houses in the burgh of Stirling to the burgh authorities. Erskine however appears to have retained possession of this friary's revenues, while it is clear that the burgh of Stirling did not gain possession until 1652.

== Burials ==
- Donnchadh, Earl of Lennox
- Murdoch Stewart, Duke of Albany

== See also ==
- List of monastic houses in Scotland
