= List of monastic houses in Northumberland =

Locations of monastic houses in Northumberland

The following is a list of the monastic houses in Northumberland, England.

Alien houses are included, as are smaller establishments such as cells and notable monastic granges (particularly those with resident monks), and also camerae of the military orders of monks (Knights Templar and Knights Hospitaller). Monastic hospitals are included where they had the status or function of an abbey, priory, or preceptor/commandery.

Abbreviations and key

Status of remains
Symbol	Status
None	Ruins
*	Current monastic function
^{+}	Current non-monastic ecclesiastic function (including remains incorporated into later structure)
^	Current non-ecclesiastic function (including remains incorporated into later structure) or redundant intact structure
^{$}	Remains limited to earthworks etc.
^{#}	No identifiable trace of the monastic foundation remains
^{~}	Exact site of monastic foundation unknown
^{≈}	Identification ambiguous or confused

Locations with names in italics indicate possible duplication (misidentification with another location) or non-existent foundations (either erroneous reference or proposed foundation never implemented) or ecclesiastical establishments with a monastic name but lacking actual monastic connection.

Trusteeship
EH	English Heritage
LT	Landmark Trust
NT	National Trust

Foundation	Image	Communities & provenance	Formal name or dedication & alternative names	References & location
Alnwick Abbey		Premonstratensian Canons — from Newhouse Abbey daughter house of Newsham; founded 1147 by Eustace FitzJohn; dissolved 1536-22 December 1539; granted to Ralph Sadler and Laurence Winnington 1550/1	The Abbey Church of the Blessed Virgin Mary, Alnwick	55°25′11″N 1°43′09″W
Bamburgh Friary		Dominican Friars (under the Visitation of York) founded before 1265; dissolved 1539		55°36′24″N 1°43′29″W
Bamburgh Monastery		Saxon monastery founded 8th century; abandoned c.875: destroyed in raids by the Danes; site now occupied by St Aidan's parish church		
Bamburgh Priory		Augustinian Canons Regular cell dependent on Nostell, Yorkshire; founded 1121: granted to Nostell by Henry I, confirmed 1121; effective c.1228; dissolved c.1537	St Aidan ____________________; Hamburgh Priory (Note: Bamburgh: 'Hamburgh' — sic. Cobbett)	55°36′29″N 1°43′06″W
Berwick Austin Friars		Augustinian Friars founded before 1299 possibly one of the houses in Berwick which survived suppression until after 10 March 1539/40		
Berwick Blackfriars, earlier site		Dominican Friars founded before 1240/1 by Alexander II; mandate by the Pope to the Bishop of St Andrews 17 June 1285, for the sale of the former house of the Friars of the Sack to the Dominicans, (see immediately below)	St Peter Martyr, of Milan	
Berwick Blackfriars		Friars of the Sack founded 1267; dissolved between 1274 and 1285; Dominican Friars (community founded at earlier site (see immediately above) before 1240/1); transferred here 1285; dissolved or secularised 1539(?)	St Peter Martyr, of Milan	
Berwick Greyfriars		Franciscan Friars Minor, Conventual founded 1231; dissolved or secularised between 10 March 1538/9 and Michaelmas 1539		
Berwick Priory		Cistercian nuns founded before 1153; sometimes confused with Holystone; dissolved or secularised 1390/1	The Blessed Virgin Mary and St Leonard of South Berwick ____________________; Nunnery of South Berwick	
Berwick Red Friars		Trinitarians founded before 1240-80, possibly at the hospital of St Edward or Bridge House; given as non-conventual 1447; given as ruinous 1456, revenues united with Peebles and declared uninhabitable by 2 March 1476, union confirmed by James III		
Berwick Whitefriars		Carmelite Friars purportedly founded 1270 by Sir John Gray (details possibly confused with Berwick Greyfriars); dissolved between 10 March and Michaelmas 1539		
Blanchland Abbey^{+}		Premonstratensian Canons daughter house of Croxton, Leicestershire; founded 1165 by Walter de Bolbec II; dissolved 18 December 1539; granted to John Bellow and John Broxholm 1545/6; part of church now in parochial use, other monastic buildings in current use in ownership of the Lord Crewe Trust	The Blessed Virgin Mary ____________________; Blanca Landa	54°50′54″N 2°03′15″W
Brinkburn Priory		Augustinian Canons Regular — from Pentney, Norfolk dependent on Pentney founded before/c.1135 (during the reign of Henry I) by William Bertram I, of Mitford (or Osebertus Colunarius); independent from before 1188(?); dissolved 1536; granted to John, Earl of Warwick 1550/1; (EH)	The Priory Church of Saint Peter and Saint Paul, Brinkburn ____________________; Berkenburne Priory	55°16′44″N 1°49′08″W
Bywell Monastery		records suggest existence of a Saxon monastery	Biguell Monastery	
Carham Priory		Augustinian Canons Regular cell dependent on Kirkham, Yorkshire; founded 1131 church of St Cuthbert and lands granted to Kirkham by Walter Espec; dissolved 1539		55°38′20″N 2°19′27″W
Chibburn Preceptory		Knights Hospitaller founded before 1313; became a member of Mount St John 1358		55°15′44″N 1°34′59″W
Coquet Island Priory		Benedictine monks founded before 684; abandoned c.800: destroyed in raids by the Danes; cell dependent on Tynemouth refounded before 1125: granted to Tynemouth by Robert Mowbray		55°20′03″N 1°32′18″W
Corbridge Monastery		Saxon monks — probably from Hexham; founded before 786 (Note: Corbridge: Adulf (Ealdwulf) was consecrated Bishop of Mayo here in 786) possibly founded before 709 by St Wilfrid (Note: Corbridge: St Wilfred died 709); abandoned before 877?: ?destroyed in raids by the Danes	St Andrew	54°58′28″N 2°01′11″W
Farne Island Cell		Anchorites hermitage cell before 651; abandoned c.800: destroyed in raids by the Danes; last anchorite died 1246, subsequently became Benedictine cell (see immediately below)		55°37′01″N 1°39′20″W
Farne Island Priory		Benedictine monks cell dependent on Durham; founded c.1193 on location of extinct anchorite cell (see immediately above); rebuilt 14th century; dissolved c.1538 restored 1840-50	St Cuthbert	55°36′59″N 1°39′20″W
Guyzance Priory		Premonstratensian Canonesses founded c.1147-52 by Richard Tison; granted to Alnwick, confirmed by William, Bishop of Durham; ceased 1349-50(?) when the community probably perished in the Black Death; Premonstratensian Canons — from Alnwick cell dependent on Alnwick; refounded after 1350; dissolved	The Prioy Church of Saint Wilfrid ____________________; Brainshaugh Priory	55°19′18″N 1°40′24″W
Hexham Priory ^{+}		Saxon monastery and cathedral founded 674 by St Wilfred and St Etheldreda, begun by St Wilfrid; diocese merged with Lindisfarne 821, cathedral status revoked; abandoned 875: destroyed in raids by the Danes; Augustinian Canons Regular founded 1113; dissolved 28 September 1536 – 26 February 1537; granted to Sir Reginald Carnaby 1538/9; now called 'Hexham Abbey'; church in parochial use	The Priory Church of Saint Andrew, Hexham Priory and Parish Church of Saint Andrew, Hexham ____________________; Hexham Abbey	54°58′18″N 2°06′10″W
Holystone Priory		Benedictine nuns founded before 1124 by Robert de Umfravillle I; Augustinian canonesses transferred 13th century; with regular priests or brethren after 1291 dissolved 1539	St Mary ____________________; Haylston Priory	55°19′06″N 2°04′21″W
Hulne Friary		Carmelite Friars founded 1242 (c.1240) by John de Vesci; dissolved 1539; granted to Thomas Reve and William Ryvet 1563/4; church demolished/ruined; part converted into a house and summerhouse 18th century; now called 'Hulne Priory'	Holm Friary; Hulne Whitefriars	55°26′06″N 1°44′35″W
Lambley Priory		Benedictine nuns founded before 1190 probably by Adam de Tindale and his wife Helwise (who granted land) (or by King John); referred to as an abbey in King John's charter (granted mistakenly); also suggested as Augustinian; burned by the Scots 1297; dissolved 1537; granted to John, Duke of Northumberland 1553	St Mary and St Patrick ____________________; Lambley upon the Tyne Priory	54°55′40″N 2°30′35″W
Lindisfarne Priory, Holy Island		Celtic monks monastic cathedral founded 635 (634) by St Aidan: granted to Aidan by King Oswald; Saxon (Benedictine?) monks refounded c.668; destroyed in raids by the Danes 793; abandoned 875: destroyed in raids by the Danes; Benedictine monks — from Durham cell dependent on Durham; founded 1083 (1082 or 1073); dissolved 1537; granted to the Dean and Chapter of Durham 1541/2; (EH)	St Cuthbert	55°40′09″N 1°48′04″W
Merchingley Priory		Tironensian monks cell (possible grange), dependent on Kelso; founded c.1168: hermitage and chapel granted to Kelso by Walter de Bolbec; sequestered by Edward I 1296	St Mary ____________________; Marchingley Priory; Mercheley Priory	54°56′05″N 2°01′02″W
Newminster Abbey		Cistercian monks — from Fountains Abbey daughter house of Fountains founded 5 January 1138 by Ranulph de Merlay; dissolved 20 August 1537; granted to Robert Brandling 1609/10; Abbey Farmhouse built on site, public access with permission	Novum Monasterium	55°09′59″N 1°42′16″W
Ovingham Priory		Augustinian Canons Regular cell dependent on Hexham; founded 1378 by Mr Ufranvile: church of St Mary granted to Hexham; dissolved 1537		54°58′03″N 1°52′07″W
Temple Thornton Camera		Knights Templar camera (sometimes considered a preceptory) founded before 1205 (during the tenure of Walter de Bolbeck), granted by William de Lisle; dissolved 1308-12; passed to Knights Hospitaller after 1308; dissolved after 1338		55°09′33″N 1°50′40″W
Warkworth Priory		Benedictine monks cell dependent on Durham; founded before 1241-9 (or between 1332 and 1353 by Henry, second Lord Percy of Alnwick, who was granted Warkworth Castle in 1332; or founded, possibly as a chantry, c.1400 by the first Earl of Northumbria); dissolved 15th century(?); ruinous and disused before 1567 (EH)	chapel of St Mary Magdalene ____________________; Warkworth Hermitage; Warkworth Castle Hermitage	55°20′47″N 1°37′13″W
Warmington Cell(?) ^{~}		Benedictine monks cell dependent on St Mary, York; cited, but no cell of this name has been identified in Northumberland		
Yeavering Monastery (?)		extensive buildings revealed by crop markings suggest monastic settlement		55°34′02″N 2°07′07″W

== See also ==
- List of monastic houses in England
