= Greyfriars, Bristol =

Franciscan friary in Bristol, England

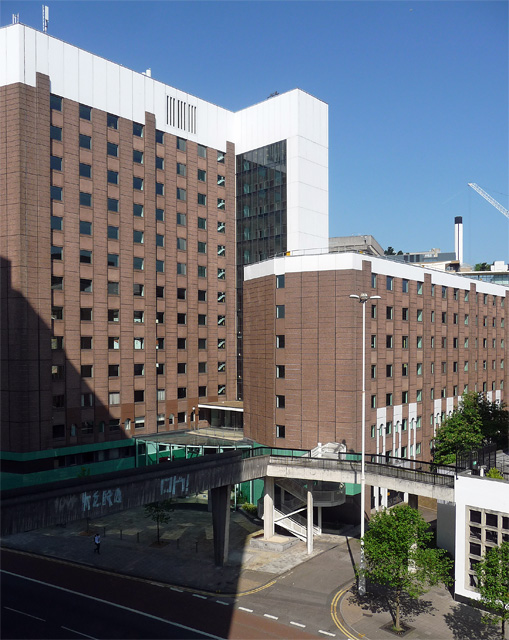
- The former Greyfriars site in 2012, now occupied by Number One Bristol

- Location within Bristol

General information
- Architectural style: monastic
- Location: Bristol, England
- Coordinates: 51.458098°N 2.595649°W
- Construction started: 13th century
- Demolished: 16th century

Greyfriars, in Bristol, England, was a Franciscan friary. The name Greyfriars derived from the grey robes worn by the friars. It was founded at some time before 1234, within the town walls and then moved to Lewin's Mead in 1250. The site included extensive gardens surrounded by a stone wall. Following the Dissolution of the Monasteries in the sixteenth century, the premises were leased to the town council in 1541, who desired to use the stone to make repairs to the town walls, and the harbour facilities. In succeeding centuries many different uses have been made of the site, which is currently occupied by an office block and part of Bristol Dental School.

== History ==
The friary was established at some time before 1234, this being known because Henry III granted wood for fuel to the friars in that year, followed by further grants of oak wood and fresh fish landed at Bristol. The friars wore long grey coats, with a grey hood or cowl, hence the name, grey friars. Originally located within the town walls, the friary was moved to Lewin's Mead in 1250. This followed the diversion of the river Frome into St Augustine's Reach. A marshy area on the north bank of the Frome was drained and some of the clay and rock from the excavations was deposited on it.

The earliest church on the site was approximately 50 by 9 metres (164 ft × 30 ft). It was later enlarged with cloisters, a bell tower and a chapter house being added. The buildings were constructed from the local red sandstone. Bristol City Museum houses some stained glass which was recovered from the chapter house, probably after the dissolution of the monasteries. Writing in the fifteenth century, William Worcester described the area of the precinct as roughly bounded by the modern Upper Maudlin Street, Lower Maudlin Street, Lewin's Mead and Johnny Ball Lane. The friars had extensive gardens devoted to horticulture. There were also two lime kilns and the whole was surrounded by freestone walls.

A report in 1538, by Richard Yngworth, during the Dissolution of the Monasteries, describes the warden of the friary as "stiff". The warden also held office in Richmond and Yngworth went on to say "yet for all his great port, I think him twenty marks in debt, and not able to pay it." Six remaining friars surrendered the property to Ingworth and it was dissolved. The precinct was leased to one Jeremy Green for a total annual rent of 20 shillings and 8 pence. In 1541, Henry VIII granted the friary, together with other dissolved houses, to the Mayor and Commonalty of Bristol for a "consideration of £1,000 cash and a yearly fee farm rent of £20". The Mayor had earlier petitioned the king, saying "The Grey Friars of Bristol is of the foundation ... of the town, built by ancient burgesses at their cost; we should like it to repair the walls and quay and to make a wharf."

== Post-dissolution ==
The site has been redeveloped many times in subsequent centuries; amongst other uses, a Moravian church and a chocolate factory have occupied premises there. It is currently occupied by an office development, also called Greyfriars, and parts of Bristol Dental School.

Traces of the abbot's house were discovered during building works in 1989 and a small oval window was incorporated into the new building. Archaeological investigations have found graves with human remains, dating to the thirteenth to fifteenth century, and a medieval conduit, similar to one excavated at Saint Augustine's Abbey in Bristol.

== Works cited ==
- Weare, George Edward (1893). A Collectanea relating to the Bristol Friars Minors (Gray Friars) and their convent: together with a concise history of the dissolution of the houses of the four orders of mendicant friars in Bristol. Bristol: W. Bennett.
