= Luffness Friary =

Architectural structure in East Lothian, Scotland

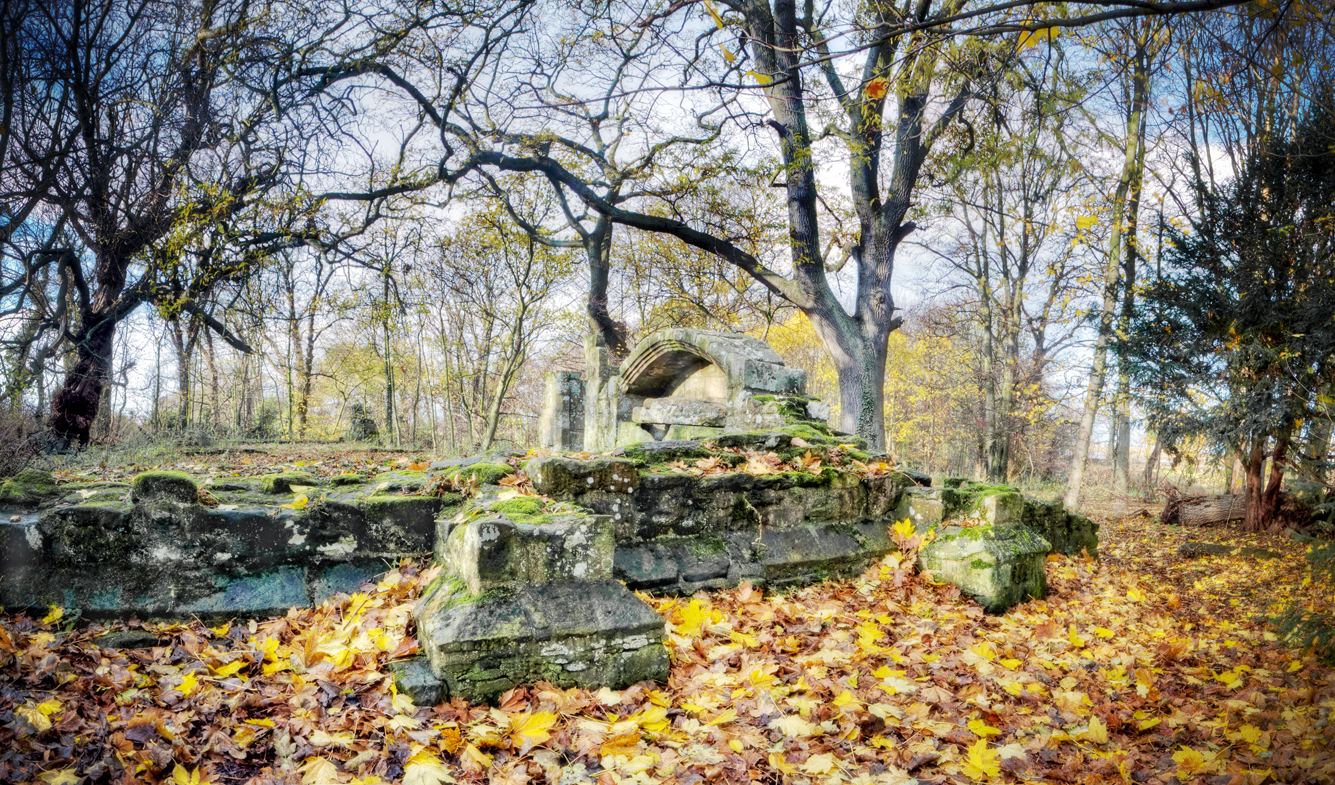
- Remains of Luffness Friary in 2009.
- Interactive map of Luffness Friary

Monastery information
- Order: Carmelites
- Established: c.1293
- Disestablished: c.1560

Site
- Location: Luffness
- Coordinates: 56°00′40″N 2°50′53″W

Luffness Friary was a friary of the Carmelites, commonly known as the Whitefriars, established in Luffness, Scotland, probably in the late thirteenth century. The site is designated as a scheduled monument.

== Site ==
Luffness Friary is located half a mile northeast of Aberlady in East Lothian. It sits south of the A198 on Bickerton’s Walk.

The church of the friary is in ruins, but the foundation remains. The church measures about 31 m. (101 ft.) by 8 m. (26 ft.). and is laid out in the customary east-west orientation, comprising a nave to the west and choir to the east. There are no aisles. The walls of the ruins are about 0.7 m. (2 ft.) in both width and height, though on the east end and north side, the wall is about 1.7 m. (5.5 ft.) high.

Also indicated are buttresses at the east and west ends of the church, and there appears to have been a wall separating the nave and choir. In the northeast corner of the choir is an arched recess containing the effigy of an recumbent knight in late thirteenth-century armor. Though the effigy is very much weathered, still apparent are the sword, being held in the right hand, and shield, resting on the chest.

A few feet south of the knight’s tomb, on the remaining pavement of the choir is a flat monumental slab marking a sixteenth-century grave. The inscription can still be read: “Hic jacet honorabilis vir Kentigernus Hepburn (dominus) de Wauchtoun” (Here lies the honorable man Kentigern Hepburn, lord of Waughton). The shield in the center of the cross displays the arms of the Hepburns. Kentigern Hepburn, also known as Mungo Hepburn, (1470-1519) was connected to the friary in that he held a charter of the lands and barony of Luffness from his father and used the signature “Kentigern Hepburn de Lufness [sic].”

Two fishponds, now overgrown, are situated about 80 m. (262 ft.) to the northeast of the friary.

== History ==
=== Carmelites in Scotland ===
The Carmelite order, known also as the Whitefriars, was founded by Berthold of Calabria, a French Crusader, on Mount Carmel in what is now northern Israel in the late twelfth century. When the Kingdom of Jerusalem (also called the Crusader Kingdom) collapsed in 1230, the hermits associated with the order returned to Europe, where they began to establish Carmelite friaries. By about 1260, they had reached Scotland with the founding of the Carmelite house at Berwick, followed by friaries at Perth in 1262 and at Aberdeen in the 1270s.

Historian and archaeologist Chris Tabraham notes the late thirteenth century is a likely time period for the establishment of the friary at Luffness since the first clear reference to the friary appears in 1335-6, when Sir John de Bickerton forfeited the lands of Luffness to Edward III. At that time, the friary was receiving ten marks per year from the lands of Luffness, leading to the conclusion that the friary was well established at that time. It received its charter from David II in 1361.
