= Chibburn Preceptory =

Priory in Northumberland, England

Coordinates: 55.2623°N 1.5831°W

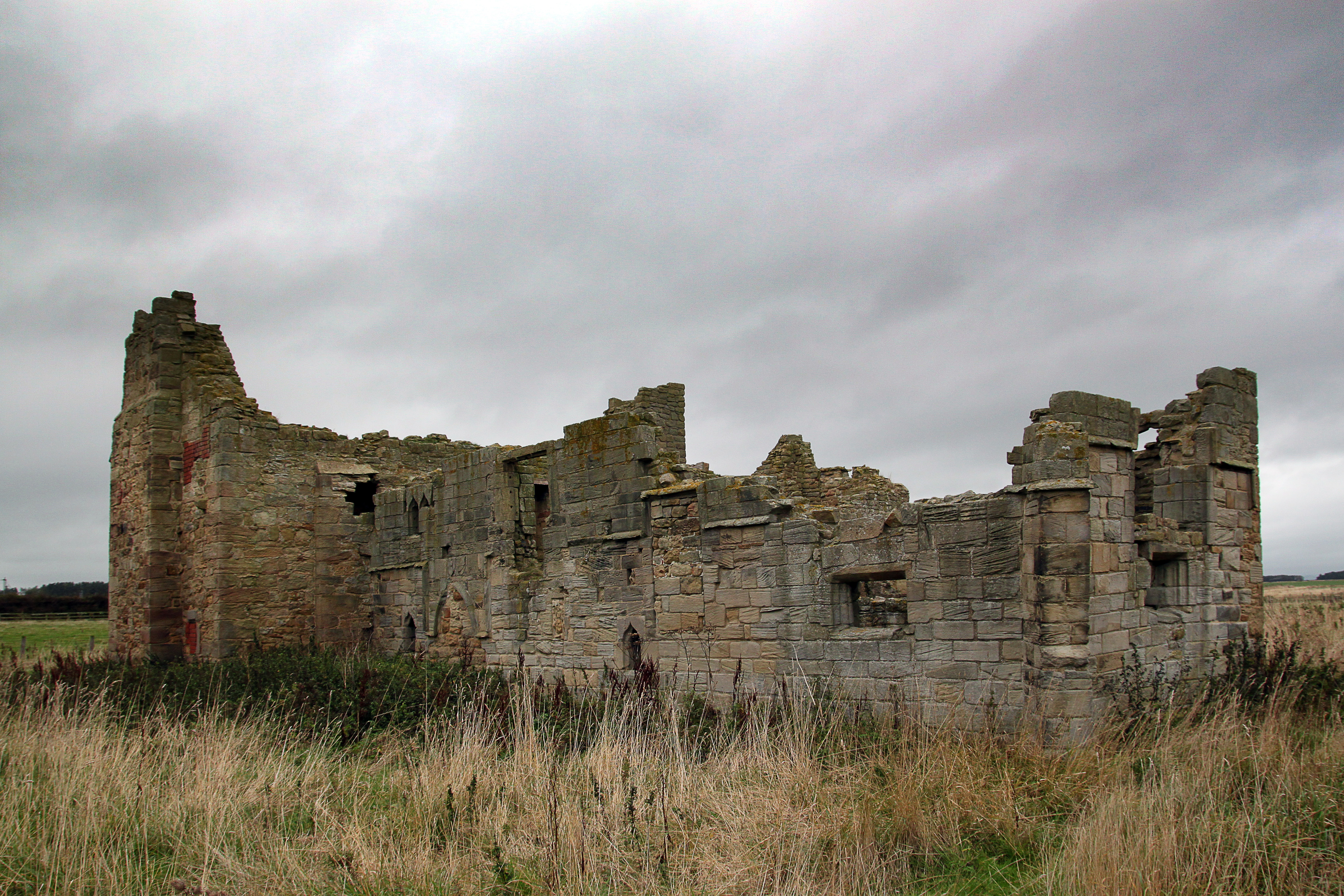
The ruins of Low Chibburn preceptory

Chibburn Preceptory (also known as Low Chibburn Preceptory) are the ruins of a Medieval/Post-Medieval Hospitaller preceptory near Widdrington in Northumberland, England. The preceptory was first recorded in 1313, and it was abolished in 1540 when all its lands were passed to the Crown and later the Widdrington family. Low Chibburn had several uses, ranging from a hospital to a dowager house before being razed by French invaders in 1691. The preceptory buildings have undergone repair and restoration by Northumberland County Council, and the site is now a Scheduled Ancient Monument protected by law.

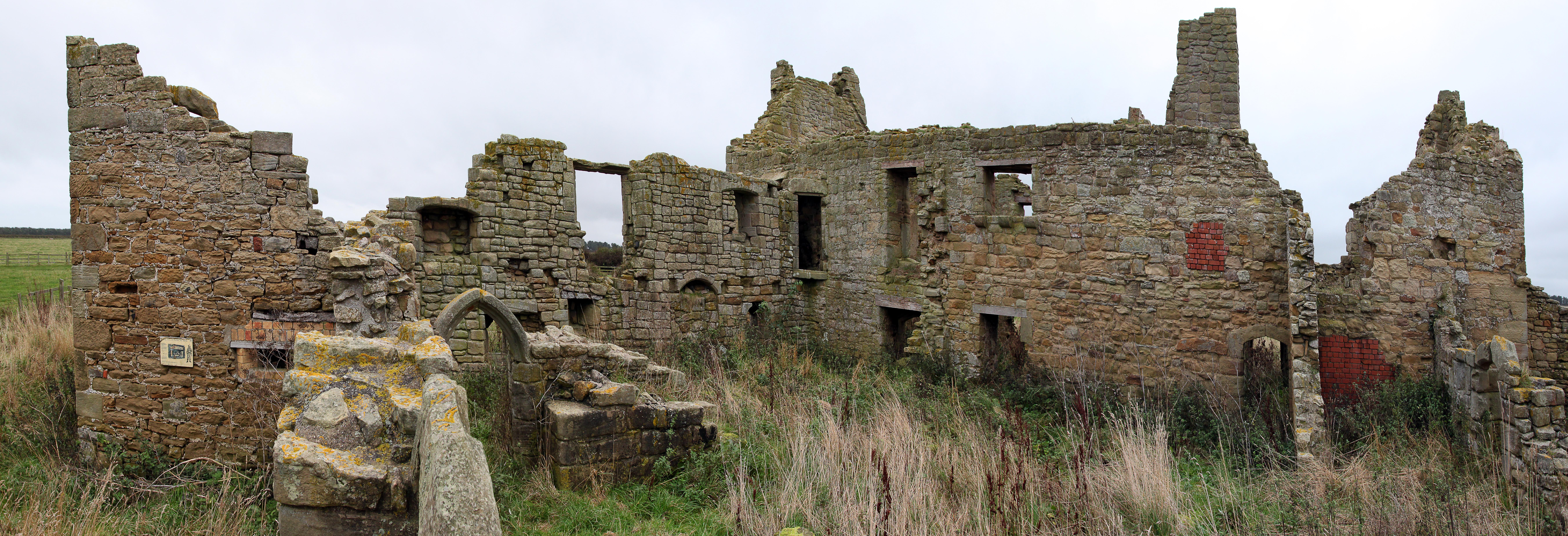
A panorama of the courtyard

== Description ==
The buildings of the preceptory consisted of a dwelling house, a chapel and various offices enclosing a small, central courtyard. Of these, only the east and south wall, along with parts of the north wall of the chapel still stand. The present dwelling house was built some time after the Dissolution of the Monasteries, possibly by Sir John Widdrington, who was given the manor of Chibburn in 1553. The preceptory was defended by a moat enclosing an area some 100 meters in diameter, and although the moat and a possible pond is still visible at the site, some of these features have been infilled and later destroyed by open cast mining in 1957. The chapel served as a pillbox during the Second World War.
