= Clova Monastery =

Culdee monastery in Aberdeenshire, Scotland

Coordinates: 57.2787°N 2.9043°W

Clova Monastery (also called Cloveth) was a medieval Culdee monastery in Kildrummy, Aberdeenshire, Scotland.

== Founding ==
Clova was founded in the late sixth century by the pre-Columban missionary known to history as Saint Moluag, who was sent from the Bangor monastery in Ulster to the Picts in Scotland in 562, a year before Iona was established by Columba.

== Site ==
Archaeological work at the site has revealed a prehistoric settlement with earth houses on the left bank of the Little Mill Burn, a tributary of the burn of Mossat, just east of Little Mill Smiddy, about a half mile south of Clova House (an eighteenth-century building), and a mile southwest of Lumsden. Near the site, the foundations of a small church, called St. Luke's by the local population, can still be traced, near which is a well called Sammiluak's. Some maintain its name is homophonous with St. Molaug's, others with St. Luke's.

Four stone crosses excavated in 1875, in the old churchyard are on display at Clova House and “may well be relics of the early Celtic monastery.” They were discovered in an upright position beneath the surface of the earth, where they had sunk over time. Traces of interment were noticeable. William Douglas Simpson tried to convey the atmosphere of the place in 1922, writing:

Standing on this very ancient and sacred site, is it not strange to think of it as the scene of a busy little Culdee community, where manuscripts were read and copied, and where schools were established to spread religion and civilization among the rude inhabitants of Kildrummy and Auchindoir, at a period when the adjoining earth houses may still have been inhabited, and when beacons blazed often on the vitrified fort at Tap o' Noth to give warning of approaching war.

== Life at Clova ==
Most of the inhabitants of Clova were lay persons doing manual labor. In addition, there were three groups of monks: (a) the seniors, older men past their years of physical labor, (b) the working brethren doing the missionary and educational work of the monastery, and (c) the juniors, novices under instruction. Relays of the brethren would have been sent to conduct Laus perennis (perpetual praise) in the church night and day. The attire of the community would have been a floor-length shirt having an upper garment with hood and sleeves, shoes of hide, and a white surplice suitable for festivals. As with other medieval monasteries, the lifestyle at Clova was austere. The monks, regardless of from which social class they sprang, would have slept on either beds of stone or boards covered with straw, though each monk would probably have had his own cell or hut. Celibacy was strictly enforced. In the surrounding hills were the “diserts,” hermitages where members could go for solitary meditation. On the south side of Tap o’ North is located the stone of Moluag, sometimes called St. Moluag's Chair. It looks toward Clova and is thought to have been the site of Moluag's personal retreat.

To accomplish the evangelistic mission of the monastery, members went out in couples for several months at a time to preach among the natives. The educational mission included not only literacy, but practical instruction in agriculture.

== Eventual disposition ==
Though the monastery survived for 600 years, little of its history was recorded, though it is known that Moluag placed it under the authority of his larger establishment at Mortlach in Banffshire. A supposed eleventh-century document purports that the church and lands of Clova were confirmed by Malcolm Canmore to the monastery at Mortlach in 1062; however, this title is now considered a forgery. Clova was merged ultimately into the Anglo-Norman system when Pope Adrian IV assigned Mortlach—along with the churches and monastery at Clova—to the See of Aberdeen in 1157.

One hint that the religious work of Clova survived into the thirteenth century is the notation that Gilbert de Stirling, bishop of Aberdeen, recovered Clova from “wicked Highlanders” in 1228. Clova eventually became a parish at which time the chapel replaced the monastery. It is argued that the name St. Luke’s was chosen for the chapel because of its similarity to the name of Clova's founder, Moluag. That is to say, after removing the first syllable of the saint's name, mo-, which is an honorific, and the endearing suffix -ag, one is left with the founder's actual personal name Lua, which is analogous to Luke.

Eventually, Clova was united with Kildrummy and denoted as “the parish of Kildrummy and Clova.” The date of this union is uncertain, though in 1363 the bishop ordained one vicar to serve both parishes with the church lands because the meagre revenues of both “are said to have been wasted by frequent wars.”
