= Greyfriars, Beverley =

Monastery in the East Riding of Yorkshire, England

Coordinates: 53.837008°N 0.435626°W

Greyfriars, Beverley was a Franciscan friary in Beverley, the East Riding of Yorkshire, England. It was established before 1267, probably by John de Hightmede, but the exact date is not known. Originally located within the town walls near today's St Mary's Terrace, it was moved outside Keldgate, near Westwood, about 1297. After it had fallen into disrepair in the 1330s, the knight Sir John Hotham of Scorbrough provided funds for its rebuilding in the 1350s. Several members of his family were buried there later. The friary benefitted further from grants made by nobles and merchants. The friars acknowledged royal supremacy in 1534, and the monastery was surrendered to the Bishop of Dover on 25 February 1538–39. Although no buildings of the friary have survived, it is remembered by the street name "Greyfriars Crescent".
