= Greyfriars, Bristol (office block) =

Office building in Bristol, England

Number One Bristol
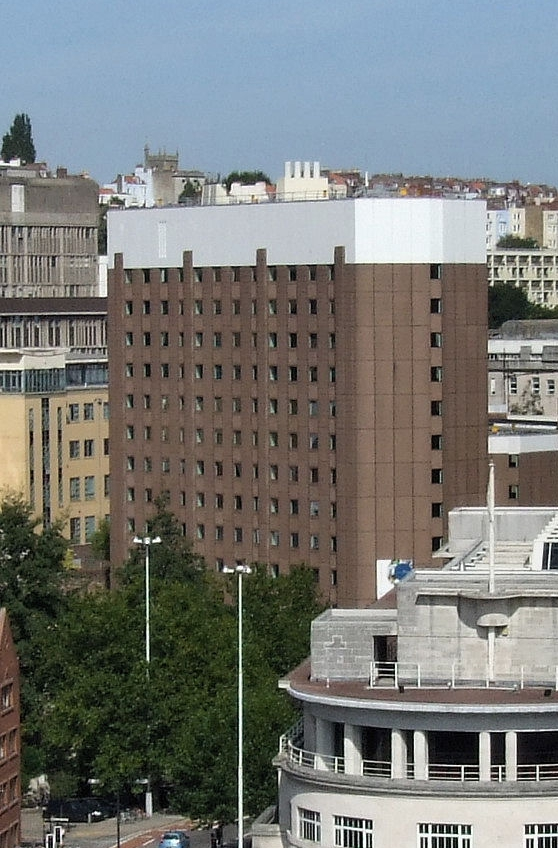
- Aerial view of Greyfriars

- Location within Bristol
- Former names: Greyfriars, Lewins Place

General information
- Status: Completed
- Location: Lewins Mead, Bristol, United Kingdom
- Coordinates: 51.4572°N 2.5955°W
- Construction started: 1972
- Completed: 1974
- Renovated: 2014

Height
- Height: 59 metres (194 ft)

Technical details
- Floor count: 14

Renovating team
- Architect: O'Leary Goss (1974)
- Renovating firm: PG Group (2016)

Website
- http://numberonebristol.co.uk/

Greyfriars is the alternate name of a fourteen-story office block built in 1974 in Lewin's Mead in Bristol. It was later used for government offices.

The building takes its name from Greyfriars, a medieval Franciscan friary which historically occupied the site.

Greyfriars was renovated in 2014 and rebranded as Number One Bristol. Two office buildings, Greyfriars and a smaller building nearby on the same block, were converted to a mix of 148 studio, one, two, and three-bedroom apartments and were launched in the spring of 2016.
