= Brechin Monastery =

Coordinates: 56°43′50″N 2°39′44″W

Brechin Monastery was a Culdee religious house located in the county of Angus in Scotland. It was founded during the reign of Kenneth II (971–995). No trace of the building remains today.

== History ==
Walter Coutts of St Salvator's College, St Andrews, conjectured that the Monastery of Brechin was founded in the tenth century near the city of Brechin, which was already flourishing at the time and may have been the Pictish center of government in the ninth century. The Picts converted to Christianity in 560 through the teaching of Saint Columba, and the Culdees probably made Brechin a seat of learning soon after.

The establishment occurred during the reign of Kenneth II, king of the Scots from 971 to 995. The Chronicle of the Picts recorded the dedication of the monastery to the Lord as, “Hic est qui tribuit magnam civitatem Brechne Domino” (Here is he who bestowed the great city of Brechin to God), a statement typical of monastic dedications at the time. Like the Culdee movement, Brechin was a part of the Celtic Church, as opposed to the Roman Catholic. Historian William Skene has speculated that part of Kenneth's motive in founding the monastery may have been to bring the Picts more under the direct influence of the Scots. The monastery has been called “the mother church of the provinces of Angus and Mearns, a centre from which the Culdee monks went out to minister to the local communities.”

Little is known of Brechin Monastery except that it was a heritable establishment in the charge of lay abbots who managed the secular properties of the institution rather than the religious program. The names of some of these abbots, who served in the time of David I (1124–1153) and William the Lion (1165–1214), have survived, with the designation “abbot of Brechin” gradually changing to the surname Abbot during William's reign.

From the reign of David I:

- Leod of Brechin (styled Leod the Abbot)
- Sampson, son of Leod

From the reign of William the Lion:

- Dovenald (styled Dovenaldus Abbe), son of Sampson
- John Abbot of Brechin (identified as filius Malisii, i.e., son of Malisius)
- Morgundus (styled filius Johannis Abbe, i.e., son of John Abbot)

Morgandus was the last of the abbes of Brechin, perhaps being killed in the Danish raids on Brechin, which, according to tradition, followed their defeat at the Battles of Barry and Aberlemno in 1014. The Danes maintained control of the city of Brechin until a peace was negotiated the following year. Because of the uncertainty of the times, no abbot was appointed to replace Morgandus. The abbatial lands were divided between the Culdees and the Crown, which retained the larger portion, later termed the Lordship of Brechin.

More is known of Brechin from the mid-twelfth century when David I, ruling from 1124 to 1153, began to “Normanize” Scotland, which entailed, in part, preferring the Roman to the Celtic Church. As part of this process, he replaced the Culdees at Brechin with a chapter of Augustinian canons.

Brechin also became a bishopric at this time, and, along with three other new bishoprics, was generously funded through the release of royal lands. Both the Culdees and the bishop of Brechin were also granted the right of a market on Sundays, which continued under David's successor, William the Lion.

In 1272, the monastery was converted into a priory of canons regular, and by the thirteenth century, the prior held a higher rank than the abbot.

== Environs ==
=== Location ===
The monastery stood just to the west of the present-day Brechin Cathedral, which was built in the twelfth century. The Irish-style Round Tower, still visible today was not part of the monastery but was contemporary with it. Nothing remains of the monastery today, though stone fragments and cross slabs have been discovered over the years, some of which are now displayed in the cathedral.

=== The Aldbar Stone ===
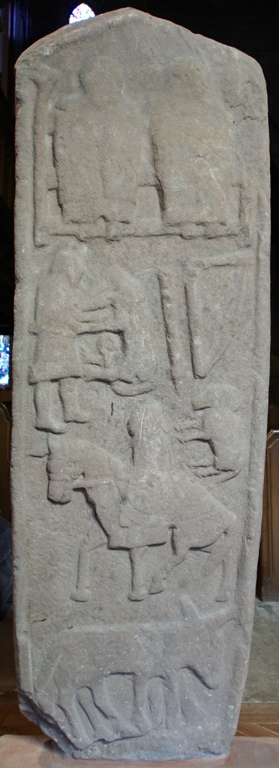
Aldbar stone.

The Aldbar (or Auldbar) Stone, which dates from the ninth or tenth century, came from the chapel at Aldbar Castle, a sixteenth-century tower house two miles southwest of Brechin. The stone is carved from red sandstone and displays relief carvings on both sides. On the front, an endless cross with the Celtic knotwork design, representing eternity, stands atop a base of two concentric squares. The cross is flanked by two monkish figures, each of whom holds a book. The reverse displays beasts and humans, including a man on horseback suggesting a hunting theme, but it also portrays the biblical King David wrestling a lion, notable in that Celtic slabs typically presented images of worldly life rather than religious themes.

=== The Mary Stone ===
The Mary (or St. Mary) Stone is a ninth-century Pictish cross slab made of red sandstone and measuring about 3 feet wide and 3 feet high. One of the carvings depicts the Virgin Mary holding a sheep-like figure representing Christ. It is notable in that it is one of the earliest sculptures discovered in Scotland that included an inscription in Latin: S. MARIA MR. XRI (St Mary the Mother of Christ). David Adams, Fellow of the Society of Antiquaries of Scotland, wrote that the absence of the typical Pictish scroll work and the presence of Christian and Trinitarian motifs suggested a Mediterranean or Byzantine origin. Portrayals of the Holy Evangelists with half-human, half-animal design points to Egypt, in particular. The Mary Stone was discovered near Brechin Cathedral in 1782 in a garden considered once to have been a part of the churchyard.

=== The Hogback Tombstone ===
The hogback tombstone displayed now in Brechin Cathedral is an eleventh-century stone carving in the Norse Ringerike style. Though one end of the hogback has been damaged, the remainder displays relief carvings of clerics intertwined with animals and the head of a large-eyed beast. Foliage is carved across the top.
