= Greyfriars, St Andrews =

Greyfriars was a religious house in St Andrews, Fife, Scotland, in the later Middle Ages. The house was Franciscan (hence "grey friars"), of the Observant (as opposed to Conventual) kind.

Founded by Bishop James Kennedy somewhere between 1463 and 1466, it received additional endowments from Kennedy's successor Patrick Graham. The foundation may not have been completed by Kennedy's death in May 1465, but was certainly initiated by him. These grants were confirmed by King James III 21 December 1479.

At its foundation, there was provision for 24 friars, though by the Reformation there is only evidence of six. In July 1547, the friary was burned by the army of Norman Leslie. It was resigned to the burgh magistrates in May 1559, and around 14 June 1559 it was destroyed, either by the Reformers or the magistrates.
