= List of monastic houses in Warwickshire =

Locations of monastic houses in Warwickshire
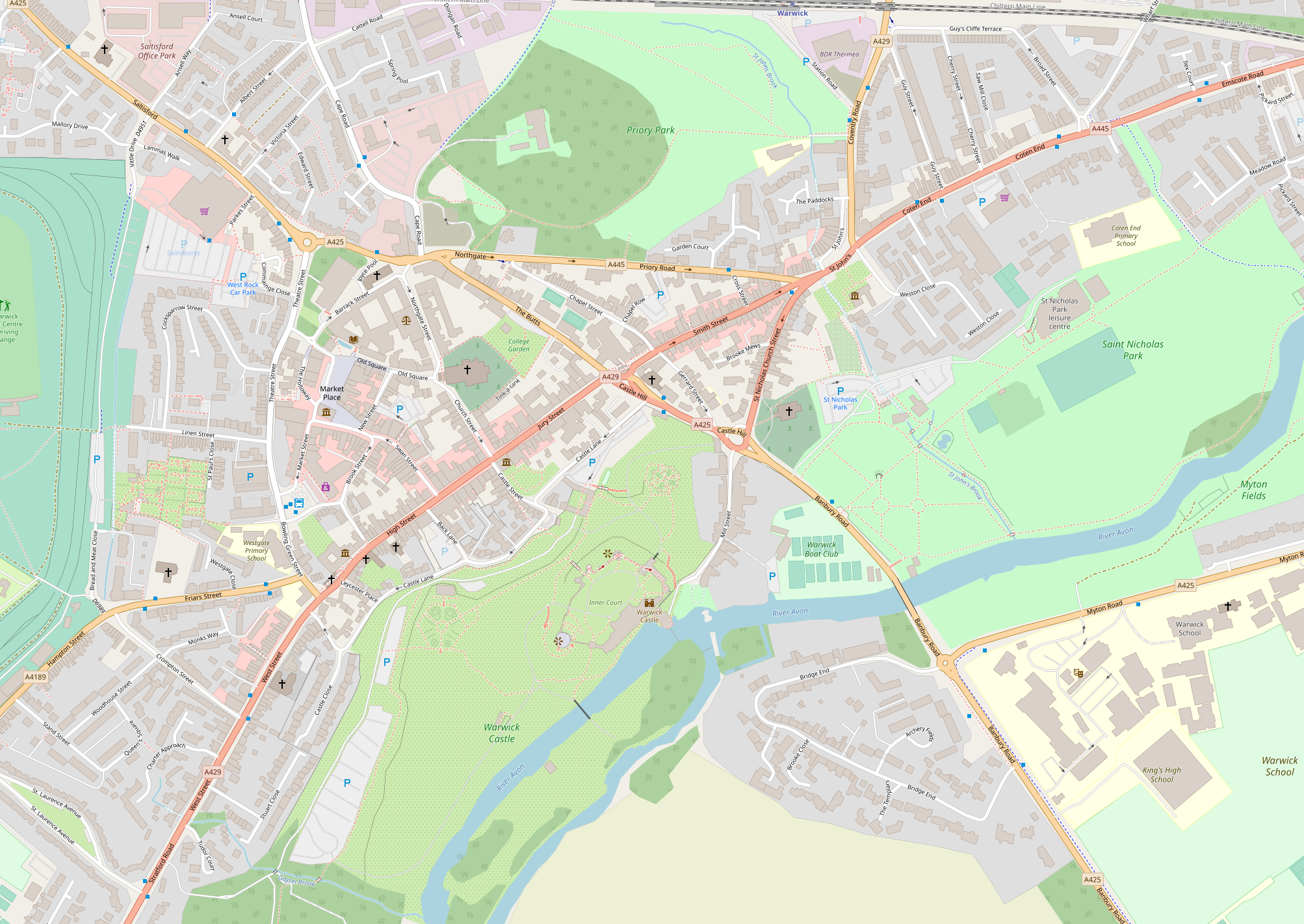
Locations of monastic houses in Warwick

The following is a list of the monastic houses in Warwickshire, England.

Alien houses are included, as are smaller establishments such as cells and notable monastic granges (particularly those with resident monks), and also camerae of the military orders of monks (Knights Templar and Knights Hospitaller). Monastic hospitals are included where they had the status or function of an abbey, priory, or preceptor/commandery.

Abbreviations and key

Status of remains
Symbol	Status
None	Ruins
*	Current monastic function
^{+}	Current non-monastic ecclesiastic function (including remains incorporated into later structure)
^	Current non-ecclesiastic function (including remains incorporated into later structure) or redundant intact structure
^{$}	Remains limited to earthworks etc.
^{#}	No identifiable trace of the monastic foundation remains
^{~}	Exact site of monastic foundation unknown
^{≈}	Identification ambiguous or confused

Locations with names in italics indicate possible duplication (misidentification with another location) or non-existent foundations (either erroneous reference or proposed foundation never implemented) or ecclesiastical establishments with a monastic name but lacking actual monastic connection.

Trusteeship
EH	English Heritage
LT	Landmark Trust
NT	National Trust

Foundation	Image	Communities & provenance	Formal name or dedication & alternative names	References & location
Alcester Abbey ^{$}		Benedictine monks founded c.1138/1140 by Ralph Pincerna le Boteler; reduced to priory cell dependent on Evesham, Worcestershire 1466; dissolved 1536; granted to William and John Sewester; demolished and quarried for the remodelling of the manor house named 'Beauchamp Court'	The Abbey Church of the Blessed Virgin Mary, Saint Anne, Saint Joseph, Saint John the Baptist and Saint John the Evangelist ____________________; Alencester Abbey	52°13′09″N 1°52′21″W
Alvecote Priory		Benedictine monks dependent on Great Malvern; founded 1159: granted to Great Malvern by William Burdet; dissolved 1536; granted to Thomas, Lord Audley and Sir Thomas Pope	St Blase ____________________; Avecote Priory	52°38′09″N 1°37′50″W
Arbury Priory		Augustinian Canons Regular — Arroasian founded after 1154 (early in the reign of Henry II) by Ralph de Sudley; Augustinian Canons Regular independent from 1235; dissolved 1534; granted to Charles Brandon, Duke of Suffolk 1538/9; site now occupied by an Elizabethan house named 'Arbury Hall'; in private ownership, used for corporate events	The Blessed Virgin Mary ____________________; Erbury Priory; Erdbury Priory; Ordbury Priory	52°30′01″N 1°30′27″W
Atherstone Austin Friars^{+}		Augustinian Friars (under the Limit of Lincoln) founded 1374 by Ralph, Lord Basset of Drayton; dissolved 1538; granted to Henry Cartwright 1543/4; nave of friary church retained for parish, chancel used as a grammar school which discontinued 1863, becoming ruinous; house built on site, demolished; house named 'Atherstone House' built on site late-18th century, extant; nave and aisles rebuilt 1849 and 1888 and chancel restored to the church	Atherston Austin Friars	52°34′45″N 1°32′41″W
Atherstone Priory		Benedictine nuns daughter house of St Benedict's, Colwich, Staffordshire; foundations laid May 1859; dissolved 1967: amalgamated with Colwich	St Scholastica	
Balsall Preceptory	Historical county location. See entry under List of monastic houses in the West Midlands			
Bretford Priory		Benedictine nuns cell founded before 1154 (during the reign of Henry II), land granted by Geoffrey de Clinton; appropriated by Kenilworth (during the incumbency of Richard, Abbot of Leicester until c.1167) with the consent of Geoffrey de Clinton; dissolved before 1167		52°23′22″N 1°23′03″W
Cawston Grange		Cistercian monks grange dependent on Pipewell, Northamptonshire; in possession of Turchis of Warwick 1086; founded after 1201: granted to Pipewell by Ingleram Clement and his son William; confirmed 1235; built by the time of Edwin the Confessor; destroyed by fire 1307; rebuilt; dissolved 1538; mansion built 16th century; demolished 1829; farmhouse built on site 19th century		52°21′08″N 1°18′10″W
Coombe Abbey		Cistercian monks — from Waverley, Surrey founded 10 July 1150 by Richard de Camvilla; dissolved 1539; granted to John, Earl of Warwick 1547/8; mansion named 'Combe Abbey House' built on site by 1581 John (afterwards Lord) Harrington; converted into a hotel, with its grounds now the country park of Coombe Country Park in the ownership of Coventry City Council	Combe Abbey	52°24′51″N 1°24′29″W
Coventry Greyfriars	Historical county location. See entry under List of monastic houses in the West Midlands			
Coventry Priory	Historical county location. See entry under List of monastic houses in the West Midlands			
Coventry — St Anne's Priory	Historical county location. See entry under List of monastic houses in the West Midlands			
Coventry Whitefriars	Historical county location. See entry under List of monastic houses in the West Midlands			
Grafton Preceptory		Knights Hospitaller founded c.1189, land granted by Henry de Grafton; dissolved before/c.1476, jointly with Balsall	Temple Grafton; Balsall and Grafton Preceptory	
Henwood Priory	Historical county location. See entry under List of monastic houses in the West Midlands			
Holywell Cell		Augustinian Canons Regular cell dependent on Rocester, Staffordshire; founded 1240–70; dissolved 1325		
Holywell Cell		Cistercian monks 'cella', grange(?) dependent on Stoneleigh; founded before 1291		
Kenilworth Abbey		Augustinian Canons Regular priory founded c.1125 by Geoffrey de Clinton, chamberlain and treasurer to Henry I: licence dated 1125; raised to abbey status after 1439; dissolved 14 April 1539; granted by Henry VIII to Sir Andrew Flamock; masonry used at Kenilworth Castle	The Blessed Virgin Mary	52°20′55″N 1°34′56″W
Maxstoke Priory		Sir William de Clinton purchased parish church 1330, initially intending to found a chantry/college; licensed 1331; Augustinian Canons Regular founded 1336/7 by Sir William de Clinton, Earl of Huntingdon; dissolved 1536; granted to Charles, Duke of Suffolk 1538/9; remains incorporated into Priory Farm; now in private ownership; church suffered substantial collapse January 1986	The Holy Trinity, The Blessed Virgin Mary, St Michael and All Saints ____________________; Mackstoke Priory	52°28′41″N 1°39′22″W
Merevale Abbey		Cistercian monks — from Bordesley, Worcestershire daughter house of Bordesley; founded 10 October 1148 by Robert de Ferrers II, Earl of Derby; dissolved 13 October 1538; granted to Walter, Lord Ferrers 1540/1; gatehouse chapel now in parochial use		52°34′38″N 1°34′14″W
Monks Kirby Priory		Benedictine monks alien house: dependent on Angers; founded 1077 by Geoffrey de Wirche (Gosfred de Wirchia); granted to Carthusians at Axholme after 1396; restored to Angers 1399; dissolved 1414; again granted to Axholme; granted to Trinity College, Cambridge 1545/6; remains incorporated into St Edith's Church	The Priory Church of Saint Mary and Saint Denis, Kirby ____________________; Kirby Priory	52°26′40″N 1°19′12″W
Nuneaton Priory		Fontevrault Benedictine nuns and monks double house — from Kintbury, Berkshire alien house: dependent on Fontevrault; founded c.1155 by Robert Bossu, Earl of Leicester; Benedictine nuns denizen: apparently independent of Fontevrault from after 1442; dissolved 1539; granted to Sir Marmaduke Constable 1540/1; remains incorporated into St Mary's Church, built on site 1876	St Mary the Virgin	52°31′31″N 1°28′38″W
Oldbury Priory		Benedictine nuns manor belonged to Polesworth; founded c.1066-70: nuns purportedly transferred from Polesworth upon expulsion by Robert Marmion I; transferred to Polesworth by Robert Marmion II; dissolved c.1130; continued as a cell and chapel until c.1272	St Laurence ____________________; St Lawrence's Chapel	52°32′57″N 1°32′23″W
Penitanham Monastery(?) ^{~}		land granted by Oshere, King of the Hwicce 693; no further reference nor identification		
Pinley Priory		Cistercian nuns (Note: Pinley Cistercian — i) Victoria County History; ii) T. Tanner, Notitia Monastica, p.574; iii) Eileen Power, Medieval English Nunneries (1922)) founded before 1135 (during the reign of Henry I) by Robert de Pillarton (Pilardinton); also given as Benedictine nuns (Note: Pinley Benedictine — W. Dugdale Monasticon Anglicanum, ed. J. Caley &c, 1468 and W. Dugdale, Monasticon Anglicanum, Volume 1, ed. Dodsworth, 1682, p.442) dissolved 1536; granted to William Wigstone, Esq. 1544/5	St Mary	52°17′22″N 1°41′18″W
Polesworth Abbey		Benedictine nuns founded before 839(?) by King Egbert; possibly refounded c.980; purportedly expelled by Robert Marmion I and transferred to Oldbury 1066–70; transferred from Oldbury c.1130 by Robert Marmion II and his wife Milicent; dissolved 31 January 1539; granted to Francis Goodyere, Esq. 1544/5; conventual church in parochial use as the Parish Church of St Editha	St Editha ____________________; Pollesworth Abbey	52°37′08″N 1°36′45″W
Shuttington Monastery ^{~}		hermit friars, no order given — apparently not Austin Friars founded 1260; no later record; church under Benedictines at Alvecote		
Stoneleigh Abbey		Cistercian monks daughter house of Bordesley, Worcestershire; (community founded at Radmore, Staffordshire 1143-7); transferred from Radmore 19 December 1154, with the consent of Henry II, foundations laid 13 April 1155; dissolved 1536; granted to Charles Brandon, Duke of Suffolk 1538/9; remains incorporated into country house named 'Stoneleigh Abbey House' built on site after 1561, altered 18th & 19th century	Stonely Abbey	52°20′18″N 1°32′02″W
Stratford-on-Avon Monastery		Saxon monks apparently founded 693-717 (during the incumbency of Ecgwine, Bishop of Worcester) dissolved after 872		
Studley Priory		Augustinian Canons Regular (community founded at Witton, Worcestershire (West Midlands) c.1135); transferred from Witton by Peter Corbezon c.1151; conventual church rebuilt, consecrated 1309; dissolved 1536; granted to Sir Edmund Knightly; site now occupied by a farmhouse	The Priory Church of Saint Mary, Studley	52°16′31″N 1°53′31″W
Thelsford Priory		Augustinian Canons Regular — Holy Sepulchre priory(?) possibly founded after 1170 (1200–1212); Trinitarians refounded c.1214: land granted by Sir William Lucy of Charlecote (William de Cherlecote), or 1224-40(?) (Note: Thelsford - Dugdale (1468), Monasticon Anglicanum states Trinitarians arrived in England 1224); dissolved 26 October 1538; granted to William Whorwood, Esq. and William Walter 1543/4	St John the Baptist and St Radegund ____________________; Thelesford Priory	52°13′18″N 1°36′19″W
Warmington Priory		Benedictine monks alien house: dependent on St-Pierre, Préaux; founded before 1123 by Paul de Prattelles, granted by Henry de Newburgh, Earl of Warwick; dissolved c.1387(?); under Toft Monks, Norfolk by 1380; dissolved 1387; granted to the Carthusians at Witham, Somerset 1428; granted to William and Francis Seldon Esqrs. 1543/4		52°07′11″N 1°24′09″W
Warwick Blackfriars ^{#}		Dominican Friars (under the Limit of Oxford) founded before 1263, site obtained for the friars by Ralph Boteler, Baron of Wem; dissolved 20 October 1538		52°16′45″N 1°35′36″W
Warwick Monastery		Saxon monks destroyed 1016 by Cnut		
Warwick Nunnery		Saxon nuns purportedly destroyed c.1016 by Cnut; subsequently site of "St Nicholas's churchyard"		
Warwick St Sepulchre Priory		Augustinian Canons Regular — Holy Sepulchre founded c.1119-23, begun by Henry Newburgh (Henry de Beaumont) probably before 20 June 1119, completed by his son Earl Roger 1123; indistinguishable from mainstream Augustinian Canons Regular after 1188; independent from after 1280 (recorded as Holy Sepulchre Canons 1280); dissolved 1536; granted to Thomas Hawkins 1546/7; remains incorporated into mansion built on site 1556, largely dismantled 1925 and removed to Virginia		52°17′06″N 1°35′13″W
Warwick Preceptory ^{#}		Knights Templar founded c.1135 (between 1123 and 1142) purportedly by Roger, Earl of Warwick; possibly superseded as preceptory by Balsall, becoming a member thereof c.1142; dissolved 1308–12; passed to Knights Hospitaller who maintained there a chaplain, bailiff and pensioner		52°16′35″N 1°34′51″W
Wolston Priory		Benedictine monks alien house: dependent on St-Pierre-sur-Dives; founded 1086-94: chapel and other endowments granted by Hubert Boldran dissolved 1394; sold to Carthusians at Coventry;		52°22′46″N 1°23′25″W
Wootton Wawen Priory		Saxon minster land granted by King Ethelbald of Mercia between 723 and 737; no further reference to that establishment; Benedictine monks alien house: dependent on Conches; founded after 1086: church and other endowments granted by Robert de Tony soon after the Norman Conquest; granted to the Carthusians at Coventry 1398; restored to Conches 1400; dissolved 1447; granted to King's College, Cambridge		52°16′05″N 1°46′41″W
Wroxall Priory		Benedictine nuns founded c.1135(?) (1141?) by Hugh, Lord of Hatton and Wroxall; dissolved 1536; granted to Robert Burgoin and John Scudamore 1544; some claustral buildings demolished and house built on site 16th century by Burgoyne family; site sold to James Dugdale 1861; more claustral buildings demolished 1864; house named 'Wroxall Abbey' built on site 1866, in use as a school; school closed 1995 and reopened as a hotel; St Leonard's church closed 1995(?) and reopened as a chapel known as 'Wren's Chapel' for an independent Christian church	St Leonard ____________________; Wroxhall Priory	52°20′03″N 1°40′33″W

== See also ==
- List of monastic houses in England

== Bibliography ==
- Binns, Alison (1989) Studies in the History of Medieval Religion 1: Dedications of Monastic Houses in England and Wales 1066–1216, Boydell
- Cobbett, William (1868) List of Abbeys, Priories, Nunneries, Hospitals, And Other Religious Foundations in England and Wales and in Ireland, Confiscated, Seized On, or Alienated by the Protestant "Reformation" Sovereigns and Parliaments
- Knowles, David & Hadcock, R. Neville (1971) Medieval Religious Houses England & Wales. Longman
- Morris, Richard (1979) Cathedrals and Abbeys of England and Wales, J. M. Dent & Sons Ltd.
- Thorold, Henry (1986) Collins Guide to Cathedrals, Abbeys and Priories of England and Wales, Collins
- Thorold, Henry (1993) Collins Guide to the Ruined Abbeys of England, Wales and Scotland, Collins
- Wright, Geoffrey N., (2004) Discovering Abbeys and Priories, Shire Publications Ltd.
- English Cathedrals and Abbeys, Illustrated, Odhams Press Ltd.
- Map of Monastic Britain, South Sheet, Ordnance Survey, 2nd edition, 1954
