= List of monastic houses in Staffordshire =

Locations of monastic houses in Staffordshire

The following is a list of the monastic houses in Staffordshire, England.

Alien houses are included, as are smaller establishments such as cells and notable monastic granges (particularly those with resident monks), and also camerae of the military orders of monks (Knights Templar and Knights Hospitaller). Monastic hospitals are included where they had the status or function of an abbey, priory, or preceptor/commandery.

Abbreviations and key

Status of remains
Symbol	Status
None	Ruins
*	Current monastic function
^{+}	Current non-monastic ecclesiastic function (including remains incorporated into later structure)
^	Current non-ecclesiastic function (including remains incorporated into later structure) or redundant intact structure
^{$}	Remains limited to earthworks etc.
^{#}	No identifiable trace of the monastic foundation remains
^{~}	Exact site of monastic foundation unknown
^{≈}	Identification ambiguous or confused

Locations with names in italics indicate possible duplication (misidentification with another location) or non-existent foundations (either erroneous reference or proposed foundation never implemented) or ecclesiastical establishments with a monastic name but lacking actual monastic connection.

Trusteeship
EH	English Heritage
LT	Landmark Trust
NT	National Trust

Foundation	Image	Communities & provenance	Formal name or dedication & alternative names	References & location
Baswich Priory		Augustinian Canons Regular founded 1174 (1173-5); land granted by Gerard de Stafford; dissolved 1538; remains incorporated into Priory Farm built on site	The Priory Church of Saint Thomas the Martyr by Stafford	52°48′13″N 2°04′29″W
Blithbury Priory ^{#}		Benedictine monks priory cell dependent on Burton; founded after 1129 by Hugh Malveysin; dissolved 1158–65; Benedictine nuns founded after 1129; apparently merged with Black Ladies, Brewood 1158–65; dissolved before 1315(?); alleged chapel demolished 1795	The Priory Church of Saint Giles, Blithbury St Egidius (St Giles) ____________________; Blythbury Priory	52°47′09″N 1°52′01″W
Brewood Priory		Benedictine nuns founded before 1150; dissolved 1538; granted to Thomas Gifford 1538/9; late-16th/early-17th century country house built on site	The Priory Church of Saint Mary, Brewood ____________________; Black Ladies Priory; Briwerne Priory; Black Ladies of Brewood Priory	52°40′54″N 2°13′37″W
Burton Abbey		Benedictine monks founded 1002 by Wulfric Spott, confirmed by charter of King Ethelred 1004; dissolved 1539; granted to Sir William Paget by Henry VIII; refounded as a college 1541; dissolved 1545	St Mary, Virgin and St Modwen, Virgin ____________________; Modwennestow Abbey; Burton upon Trent Abbey	52°48′01″N 1°37′50″W
Calwich Priory		hermitage (hermetorium de Calwich); Augustinian Canons Regular priory cell dependent on Kenilworth, Warwickshire founded between c.1125 and 1149: hermitage granted to Kenilworth by Nicholas de Gresley alias fitzNiel and his wife Margery; independent from 1349; granted to Merton 1535–6; Georgian-style house built on site 1849–50, now derelict	St Margaret ____________________; Calwick Priory	52°59′13″N 1°48′35″W
Canwell Priory		Benedictine monks founded c.1142 (1131–48) by Geva, daughter of Hugh, Earl of Chester; dissolved 1524–6, suppressed to found Cardinal Wolsey's college Cardinal College, Oxford; reverted to the Crown; much of the property passed briefly to St George's Chapel, Windsor 1532	The Priory Church of Saint Mary, Saint Giles, and All Saints, Canwell	52°36′10″N 1°47′06″W
Colwich Abbey *		Benedictine nuns — from Cannington, Somerset (community founded in Paris 1651 by the English nuns at Cambrai) settled in England 1795 after French Revolution transferred here 1836; returned to English Benedictine Congregation 1926; raised to abbey status 1928	The Abbey Church of Our Lady of Good Hope, Colwich	52°47′24″N 1°59′22″W
Cotton Abbey ^{~}		Cistercian monks — from Aunay-sur-Odon founded 1176, granted to Aunay by Bertram de Verdun transferred to new site at Croxden 1178; granted to Jeffrey Foljamb 1544/5	Chotes Abbey; Chotene Abbey	53°00′08″N 1°54′43″W; 52°58′31″N 1°53′50″W
Croxden Abbey		Cistercian monks — from Cotton (community founded at Cotton 1176); transferred here 17 May 1178; dissolved 17 September 1538; (EH)	The Abbey Church of the Vale of Saint Mary at Croxden	52°57′17″N 1°54′14″W
Dieulacres Abbey		Cistercian monks transferred from Poulton, Cheshire founded 1214, site granted by Randal de Blunderville, Earl of Chester after 1199; dissolved 20 October 1539; granted to Ralph Bagnall 1552/3; site now in private ownership at Abbey Green	St Mary, Virgin and St Benedict	53°07′04″N 2°01′37″W
Dudley Priory		Cluniac monks alien house: dependent on Wenlock, Shropshire; founded 1161 by Ralph Painell, lord of the manor; became denizen: independent from 1395; dissolved 1539; granted to the Bishop of Lichfield 1540/1	St James	
Farewell Priory		hermits or canon brothers: unknown order and foundation; Benedictine nuns founded before 1148 (c.1140) by Roger de Clinton; raised to abbey status between 1154 and 1189 (during the reign of Henry II); reduced to priory status before 1210; dissolved 1527; site now occupied by St Bartholomew's Church	The Priory Church of Saint Mary, Farewell ____________________; Farewell Priory	52°42′08″N 1°52′42″W
Hawkesyard Priory		Dominican Friars		
Hulton Abbey		Cistercian monks daughter house of Combermere, Cheshire; founded 26 July 1219 by Henry de Audley; dissolved 18 September 1538; granted to Sir Edward Aston 1542/3	Hilton Abbey	53°02′22″N 2°08′33″W
Hansury Nunnery		Benedictine? nuns founded c.680 by St Werburgh at the instance of her uncle King Ethelred destroyed in raids by the Danes 875		
Keele Preceptory		Knights Templar land granted by Henry II 1168–9; dissolved 1308-12 granted to the Earl of Gloucester; Knights Hospitaller founded c.1312 (1324); dissolved after 1338; country house named 'Keele Hall' built on site c.1580, rebuilt 1856–61		53°00′00″N 2°16′13″W
Lapley Priory		Benedictine monks alien house: dependent on St-Remi, Riems; founded by Ælfgar (Algar), Earl of Chester; dissolved 1415; granted to Tong College; granted to Sir Richard Mannors 1547/8	Lappele Priory	52°42′50″N 2°11′25″W
Lichfield Greyfriars		Franciscan Friars Minor, Conventual (under the Custody of Worcester) founded c.1237 (1229) by Alexander, Bishop of Lichfield; dissolved 1538; granted to Richard Crumbilthorn 1544/5		52°40′53″N 1°49′49″W
Little Haywood Abbey *		Benedictine nuns	The Abbey Church of Saint Mary, Little Haywood	52°47′25″N 1°59′23″W
Newcastle-under-Lyme Blackfriars		Dominican Friars (under the Visitation of Oxford) founded before 1277; dissolved 1538; cattlemarket built on site 1871; superstore built on site before 2005		53°00′32″N 2°13′40″W
Oulton Abbey *		Benedictine nuns founded 1853; with girls' boarding school, then playgroup 1968, then care home, St. Benedict's Nursing and Residential Home 1989	The Abbey Church of Saint Mary, Oulton	52°55′05″N 2°08′07″W
Radmore Abbey		hermitage founded 1135–9, site granted by King Stephen, confirmed by Roger, Bishop of Lichfield, who allowed the community to adopt the order of their choice Cistercian monks daughter house of Bordesley; converted c.1143/7-1155 monks transferred to Stoneleigh 1155; converted to a royal hunting lodge	The Abbey Church of Saint Mary, Radmore ____________________; Red Moor Priory	52°42′15″N 1°56′26″W
Ranton Priory		Augustinian Canons Regular — (?)Arroasian priory cell dependent on Haughmond, Shropshire; founded between 1135 and 1166 by Robert fitz Noel (Noeli); independent from 1246–7; dissolved 1536; granted to Robert Wiseman 1538/9	St Mary ____________________; Ronton Abbey; de Sartis	52°48′57″N 2°14′29″W
Rocester Abbey ^{$(?)}		Augustinian Canons Regular founded c.1146 by Richard Bacon (Bacoun); dissolved 1538; granted to Richard Trentham 1539/40	The Blessed Virgin Mary ____________________; Roucester Abbey	52°57′04″N 1°50′07″W
Sandwell Priory	Historical county location. See entry under List of monastic houses in the West Midlands			
Stafford Austin Friars		Augustinian Friars (under the Limit of Lincoln) founded 1344 by Ralph de Stafford, permission granted by the Pope 1343; dissolved August 1538, surrendered to Richard Ingworth, Bishop of Dover; granted to Thomas Neve and Giles Isam	Austin Friars, Stafford	52°48′10″N 2°06′52″W
Stafford Greyfriars		Franciscan Friars Minor, Conventual (under the Custody of Worcester) founded before 1274; dissolved 10 August 1538, surrendered to Richard Ingworth, Bishop of Dover; granted to James Leverson 1539/40; house called 'Grey Friars' built on site before 1610		52°48′47″N 2°07′17″W
Priory of St Thomas nr. Stafford				
Stone Priory		secular canons founded c.670 by Wulfhere, King of Mercia destroyed in raids by the Danes 9th century, canons dispersed; Benedictine nuns apparently founded before 1066; replaced or dispersed before c.1135; Augustinian Canons Regular priory cell dependent on Kenilworth, Warwickshire; granted to Kenilworth; founded c.1135 by Enisan de Waleron; independent from after 1260; dissolved 1536; granted to George Harper 1538/9	St Wulfad and St Rufin St Wulfad St Mary, St Wulfad and St Michael	52°54′04″N 2°08′41″W
Trentham Priory		possible minster before 1066 (Note: Trentham — once identified as the nunnery founded by Werburgh at Tricengeham, but now thought to be Threckingham (Threekingham), Lincolnshire) possible Benedictine monks possibly founded c.1087-1100 subsequently lapsing; Augustinian Canons Regular (re)founded before 1153-5 by Ranuph II, Earl of Chester; dissolved 1537 (1536)	The Priory Church of the Blessed Virgin Mary and All Saints, Trentham ____________________; Trickingham Priory(?)	52°57′55″N 2°12′07″W
Tutbury Priory ^{+}		Benedictine monks alien house: dependent on S-Pierre-sur-Dives; founded after 1080 (1066–1086) by Henry de Ferrers; became denizen: independent from after 1431–3; dissolved 14 September 1538; granted to Sir William Cavendish 1552/3; part of conventual church now in parochial use	St Mary Virgin	52°51′33″N 1°41′16″W
Wolverhampton Monastery	Historical county location. See entry under List of monastic houses in the West Midlands			

== See also ==
- List of monastic houses in England
