= Farewell Priory =

Benedictine nunnery near Lichfield, Staffordshire, England

Farewell Priory (Black Ladies)
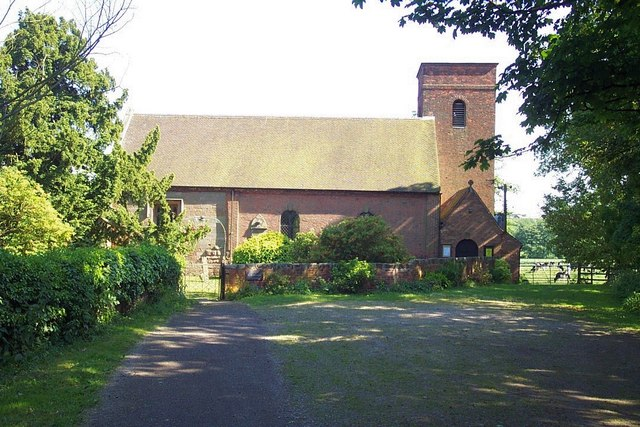
- St Bartholomew's Church, Farewell, today. It incorporates some of the medieval stonework at the eastern end.

- Location within Staffordshire
- Interactive map of Farewell Priory (Black Ladies)

Monastery information
- Full name: Convent of St. Mary, Farewell
- Order: Benedictine
- Established: Mid-12th century
- Disestablished: 1527
- Dedication: Mary, mother of Jesus
- Diocese: Diocese of Coventry and Lichfield
- Controlled churches: Farewell

People
- Founder: Roger de Clinton
- Important associated figures: Bishop Roger Northburgh carried out canonical visitation.; Bishop Robert de Stretton also carried out a visitation; Cardinal Thomas Wolsey initiated the dissolution.; Bishop Geoffrey Blythe, closely involved in dissolution.; William, Lord Paget leased the site after dissolution.

Site
- Location: Farewell near Lichfield
- Coordinates: 52.7023°N 1.8783°W
- Public access: Site open to public. Church in use.

Farewell Priory was a Benedictine nunnery near Lichfield in Staffordshire, England. Although it received considerable episcopal support, it was always small and poor. It was dissolved in 1527 as a by-product of Cardinal Wolsey's scheme to establish a college within Oxford University.

== Foundation ==
A religious community was founded at Farewell by Roger de Clinton, Bishop of Lichfield and Coventry (1129 – 48). It is clear that the house was originally described as an abbey and it was originally made up of male hermits. A charter of the bishop specifies that it is a grant to canonicis fratribus, suggesting the community were canons regular, probably Augustinian. The locality in which they held land and could assart in the woods was named as Chirstalleia, which seems to be Chestall, now a hamlet to the east of Castle Ring and north of Cannock Wood. The charter also conceded rights of pannage and pasturage. A further grant affirms that it is made in response to the requests of domini Rogeri et Gaufridi et Roberti, heremitarum et fratrum de Faurwelle: Masters Roger, Walter and Robert, hermits and brothers of Farewell. However, the purpose of the grant is to transfer the church and their lands, together with small estates at Pipe and Hammerwich, to a community of women. Hence it seems that both the initial grant to a male hermitage and its replacement as beneficiary by a nunnery were the work of the same bishop. It is unclear whether the male community simply disappeared or continued in one or more different forms. As late as 1167 an estate at Pipe Magna was recorded by the sheriff as terra trium canonici de Pipa, "the land of the three canons of Pipe." Moreover, Radmore Abbey, a Cistercian house, was established a short distance away during the same period as Farewell, incorporating hermits who already lived nearby and also with the involvement of Roger de Clinton.

== Order and patronage ==
Farewell was recorded as a Benedictine priory in diocesan records and it was to Benedictine houses that the remaining nuns were transferred at its dissolution. The commission for its dissolution names it explicitly as prioratum beatae Mariae de Farewell ordinis sancti Benedicti. However, it was described as Cistercian in the bishop's register in 1425. One factor in the confusion is that Langley Priory, its daughter house in the parish of Breedon on the Hill in Leicestershire, seems to have posed as Cistercian in the 12th century in order to secure the exemptions from tithes enjoyed by Cistercian houses. This was contested by Augustinian Breedon Priory, which had appropriated Breedon parish church and thus stood to lose tithes if Langley's claim was accepted. Pope Alexander III commissioned an investigation by the Cistercian abbot of Garendon Abbey and the Augustinian prior of Kenilworth Priory, which adjudicated in favour of the nuns. However, the nuns could not maintain their position for long and, in order to obtain exemption they were compelled in or about 1229 to hand over a toft, an acre of land and a payment of seven marks.

When licensing Farewell to acquire property in 1398, Richard II described it as being "in the king's patronage." However, this was an isolated incident. It was an episcopal foundation and the bishop of the time was central to its final dissolution.

== Relations with Langley Priory ==
Langley Priory was established with nuns drawn from Farewell, as was acknowledged in its charter of about 1180 from William de Ferrers, 3rd Earl of Derby. Farewell's claims over its daughter house became controversial and, under an agreement of about 1210 the prioress of Farewell was allowed to take part in the election of the prioress of Langley when a vacancy occurred. However, the election would go ahead even if she failed to attend or to send representatives. Other claims were withdrawn. It was also agreed that Alice de Hely, a Farewell nun at that time residing at Langley, would remain in place for five years and then return to the mother house. The dispute flared up again in subsequent decades and under a composition, embodied in a charter issued by Prioress Serena of Farewell in 1248, Langley was to pay 4 marks annually, with a penalty for non-payment of 40 shillings.

== Estates ==
Sketch-map showing locations of the main estates and properties of Farewell Priory, Staffordshire.

As well as conferring the church of St Mary at Farewell, with a mill and wood, Roger de Clinton's charter to the nuns gave them the land between the banks of two streams, called Chistalea and Blachesiche. Included are the labour service, tenures and homes of six families of serfs. The bishop also confirmed donations from two others: assarts and lands at Pipe, given by the bishop's chaplain, Hugh, and half a hide given by Hamminch of Hammerwich. The donation of Hamminch was to be split in two, with half held by the convent in demesne and the other half held of the church by Hamminch's heir. Walter Durdent, Roger de Clinton's successor, appended a confirmation to the charter, adding the lands and service of Alurich de Quadraria and his sons, which were valued at six shillings per annum. The grant is explicitly stated to be monialibus de Faurwelle, to the nuns of Farewell.

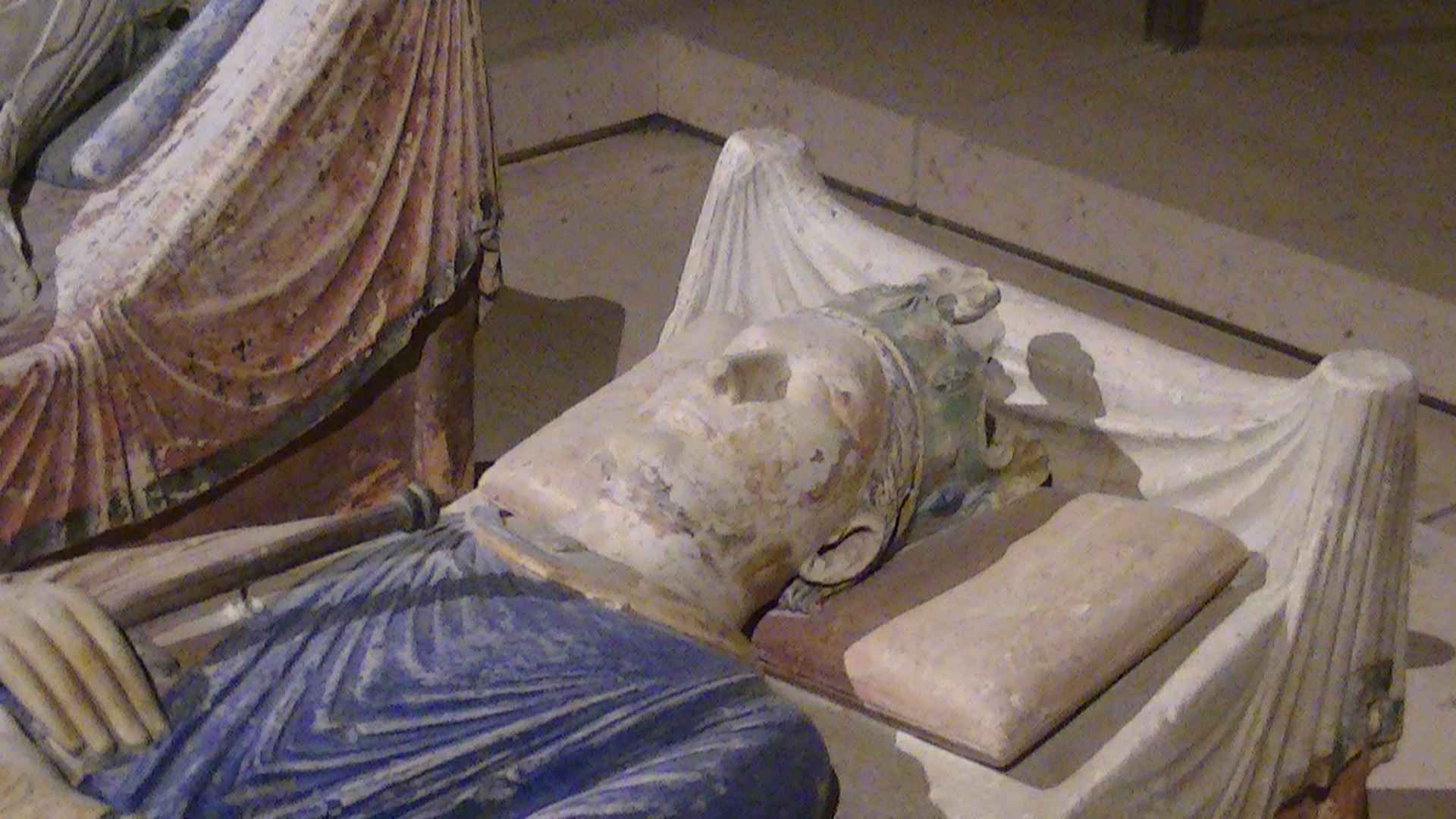
Effigy of Henry II of England on his tomb in the church of Fontevraud Abbey

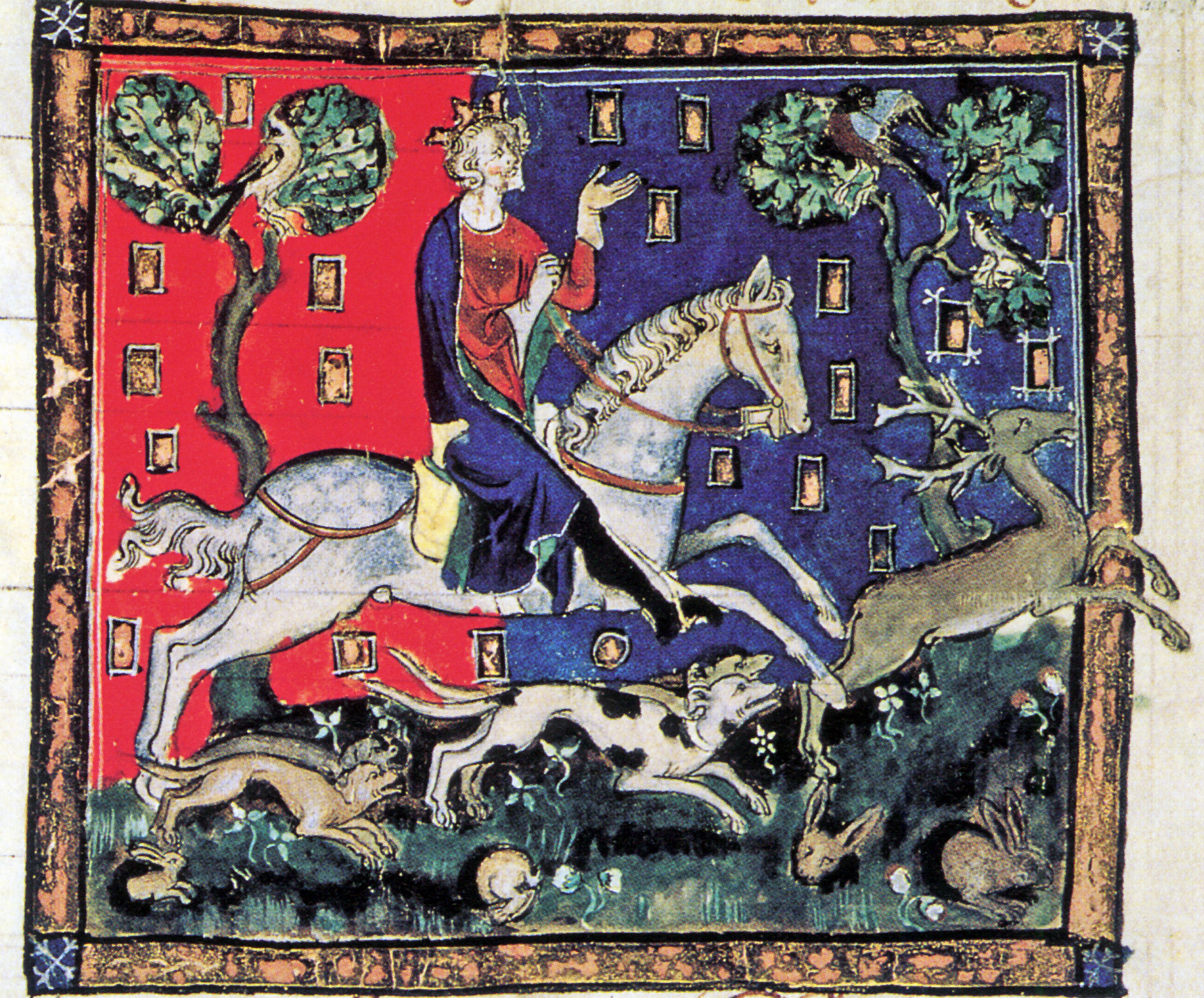
King John on a stag hunt

Henry II granted a charter to the nuns of Farewell when at Radmore, now Red Moor, south of Cannock Wood. There seem to be longer and shorter versions of the same document but both are recorded as witnessed apud Rademoram. Henry II is known to have stayed at Radmore in February 1155, and the charter was probably issued during this visit. The king listed a number of properties and rights he wished to confirm.

- The location and foundation of the abbacie sue apud Fagerwellan in foresta mea de Chanoc: their abbey at Farewell in the royal forest of Cannock or Cannock Chase.
- 3 carucates of demesne land at Farewell, with the homages and mills that went with them
- 8 acres worth 2 shillings per annum at Farewell, the gift of Robert the reeve and Thomas his son.
- Marsh or moorland that could be turned into meadow.
- 1 carucate at Pipe assarted from the king's forest.
- 1 carucate at Hammerwich cum villani et franchelano nomine Hamone Vielario: with villeins and a franklin or free man named Hamon the fiddler, together with their tenancies and some pasture. The name of the franklin seems very similar to that of Hamminch, the original donor of Hammerwich, and may be him or his heir.
- 40 acres at Lindhurst in the king's own manor of Alrewas: an area assarted from the waste in Cannock Chase and lying along the edge of the bishop's land. This came with manorial rights, including pannage, pasturage, and access to waterways.
- A promise to recognise all reasonable future gifts which the priory might acquire.
- Release and freedom from all secular services, including a number of specified court duties and taxes.

Around 1170 Geoffrey Peche granted land and a man to cultivate it at "Morhale" as the dowry of Sara, his daughter, when she entered Farewell – commonly a source of small endowments for nunneries. The Peche family were prominent in Warwickshire and the Bishop of Coventry and Lichfield at the time was Richard Peche, one of two to bear that surname in the 12th century. It was the bishop who had originally given Geoffrey the land that he conveyed to Farewell.

On 3 April 1200 King John confirmed the grants enumerated by his father, Henry II. Once again the nunnery was referred to as abbatia, an abbey. In the same year Farewell was listed as a nunnery receiving royal alms of 40 shillings, alongside its daughter house of Langley Priory and nearby Blithbury Priory. The pipe rolls for 1203–4 record alms of 6 marks, double the original amount, to the same houses and some others. These were useful windfalls but never developed into a regular income for Farewell or the other houses.

In 1251 Henry III recognised an important exemption of Farewell by mandating the seneschal of Cannock Forest to refrain from collecting pannage dues, as these were contrary to the liberties the nuns had from his royal predecessors. There is scattered evidence from the same century that Farewell held other small estates. The transfer of a serf at Chorley from the priory to a canon of Lichfield Cathedral shows that Chorley was held by Farewell Priory. In 1279 the prior of the Augustinian Llanthony Priory, then in Gloucestershire, sued the prioress of Farewell for rents and services he claimed were due for a holding of two carucates and a messuage in Longdon. These included two marks and the provision of a priest to celebrate Mass in the chapel at Radmore, which the prior claimed Prioress Julia had accepted in the reign of Henry III. The claim was contested. Farewell also acquired a house in Lichfield and land at Curborough.

In the 14th century, there is further evidence of small gains and patient defence of holdings. The original house in Lichfield, which was on Quonians Lane, off Dam Street, and in the priory's hands by 1283, had been joined by five further properties by 1399. On 28 February 1321 Philip de Somerville, king's clerk to Edward II, was licensed to alienate in mortmain to Farewell 20 acres of waste that he held as a tenant-in-chief at the royal manor of Alrewas. In 1353 Prioress Margaret attempted to regain control of land at Elmhurst. She sued Ralph de Wal and Adam Lewis, alleging that they had violently ejected her from custody of both the land and the heir of John West of Elmhurst. She claimed that John had held the land from her by military service and presumably she claimed wardship of his heir, who was a minor. An old issue arose again in 1360, when the prior of Llanthony demanded arrears of 100 marks, apparently in vain. In 1367 Prioress Agnes sued Humphrey, son of Simon de Rugeley, by writ of quare cessavit per biennium for ten acres of cultivated land and two of moor at Longdon. Humphrey succeeded in getting the case adjourned and by the time it again came to court, more than three years later, he was dead and the prioress was suing his son Thomas, this time successfully.

In 1375 Edward III issued an inspeximus confirming Henry II's comprehensive charter. On 30 January 1398 the priory obtained a licence to acquire in mortmain properties to the yearly value of 10 marks, although the lands in question were not specified. At the time of dissolution in 1527 the priory's holdings were recorded as:

- Farewell and Chorley: three messuages, one cottage, a water-mill and 1400 acres of land.
- Curborough, Elmhurst, Lea, Lenthurst, Alrewas: two messuages and 470 acres.
- Hammerwich: a messuage and 50 acres.
- Ashmore Brook: a messuage and 40 acres.
- Lichfield: three messuages.
- Kings Bromley: 11 acres.
- Water Eaton: one messuage, a croft and 22 acres.
- Cannock, Abnalls, Pipe and Burntwood: 140 acres.
- Rugeley, Brereton, Handsacre: 20 acres
- Oakley: 6 acres of meadow.
- Tipton: a mill and 26 acres

The priory's estates formed a fairly compact group. In the early 14th century, before the onset of the agrarian crisis of 1315–22 and the still more devastating Black Death, there was demesne farming at Farewell, Curborough, and Hammerwich. Hammerwich by this time had 30 about 30 tenants who were legally free but owed labour service at harvest time as part of their rent. However, they had commuted the labour dues into payments of ½d. to 2d. During the course of the century the convent began sheep farming, while demesne farming at Hammerwich, at least, seems to have ceased by 1419: both common responses to a century of rising labour costs. The social status of tenants varied greatly, and could be high, as on the Abnalls estate, now in Burntwood, which seems to have evolved from the holdings at Pipe. This was held of the priory in the late 14th century by Aymer Taverner, whose surname is self-explanatory and suggests fairly humble origins. However, while changing his name to Lichfield, he made himself a major landholder and represented Staffordshire twice in the House of Commons, as well as serving two terms as sheriff of his own county and two as Sheriff of Warwickshire and Leicestershire. After Aymer the estate was held for about 17 years by Sir William Newport, who was MP for the county in three Parliaments and sheriff for three terms.

== Monastic life ==
Knowledge of the religious life in Farewell is largely based on two canonical visitations of the 14th century, which necessarily emphasise issues for improvement. Roger Northburgh carried out a visitation in 1331 and wrote his decree in French, as the nuns did not understand Latin. It seems that there had been a Latin original, which they had not followed. Two of the nuns had left the convent. In the case of Alice de Kynynton, Northburgh promised to support the prioress with la verge de discipline: this may not imply physical correction, as verge could simply mean a rod of office rather than a big stick. Cecily of Gretton, was to receive counselling and instruction from a nun nominated by the prioress. As always, Northburgh demanded proper accounts from the officials of the convent. As was quite common, he criticised the nuns for extravagant dress: in this case silk girdles and purses. They should elect an older nun to take charge of clothing. The nuns were also ordered not to sleep with each other or with young girls in the dormitory. Two servants were to be put out of the house and only young women intending to become nuns should be accommodated there. A rear door was to be kept locked to prevent recurrence of previous scandals.

Some of the same issues were discussed again in the decree of Robert de Stretton, dated 12 January 1358, following a visitation in 1357. It seems that the nuns were partial to taking trips to Lichfield: they were warned not to do so without permission from the prioress. They were to be accompanied by two other nuns and were not to tarry in the town. Further, nuns were not to leave the precincts of the priory at all without permission, although the custom of taking the air together was commended. No secular women should have been living on the premises without the bishop's permission and any so doing were to leave by the next Feast of the Purification (2 February). The same applied to unauthorised children: with the bishop's permission each nun was allowed to keep one child for education, but males over seven years were excluded. The bishop demanded that nuns keep the vows of poverty, chastity and obedience and the prioress was to report breaches to him. The prioress and officials were to render accounts at least annually to the convent. Separate food rations had proved uneconomic and all the nuns were to eat together in the prioress's hall. Except in case of sickness, the only fire was to be in the building housing the Gesthall or infirmary. Monastic property could not to be granted away without the bishop's permission and any unauthorised grants were invalid. The decree itself was to be read out and explained in English by a literate cleric on the day after it was received.

== Dissolution and after ==
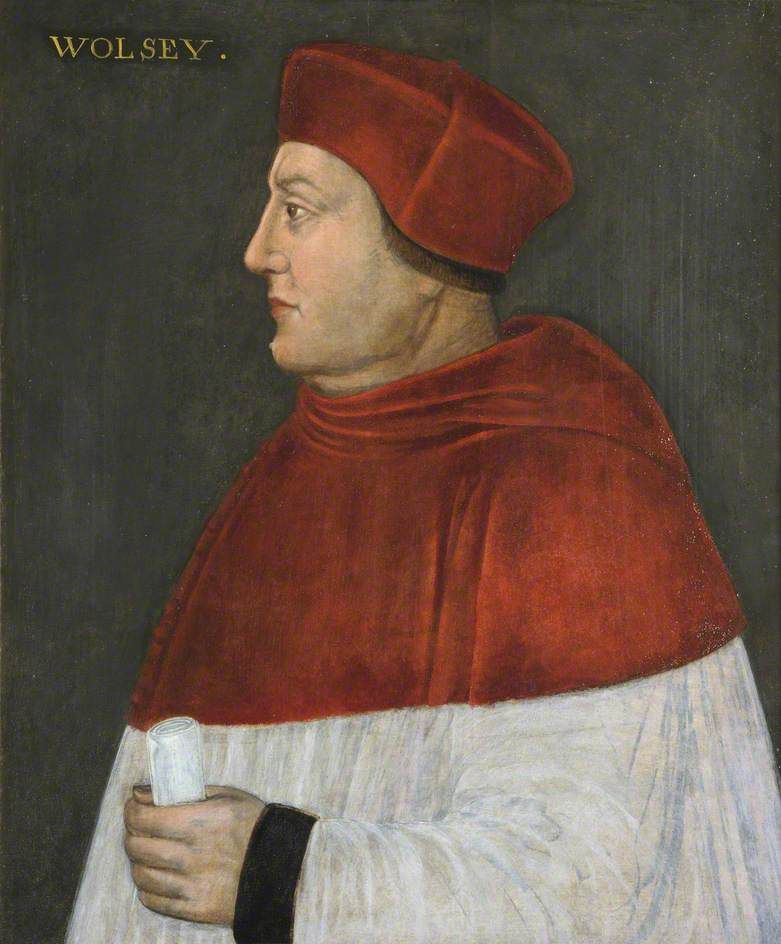
Portrait of Thomas Wolsey

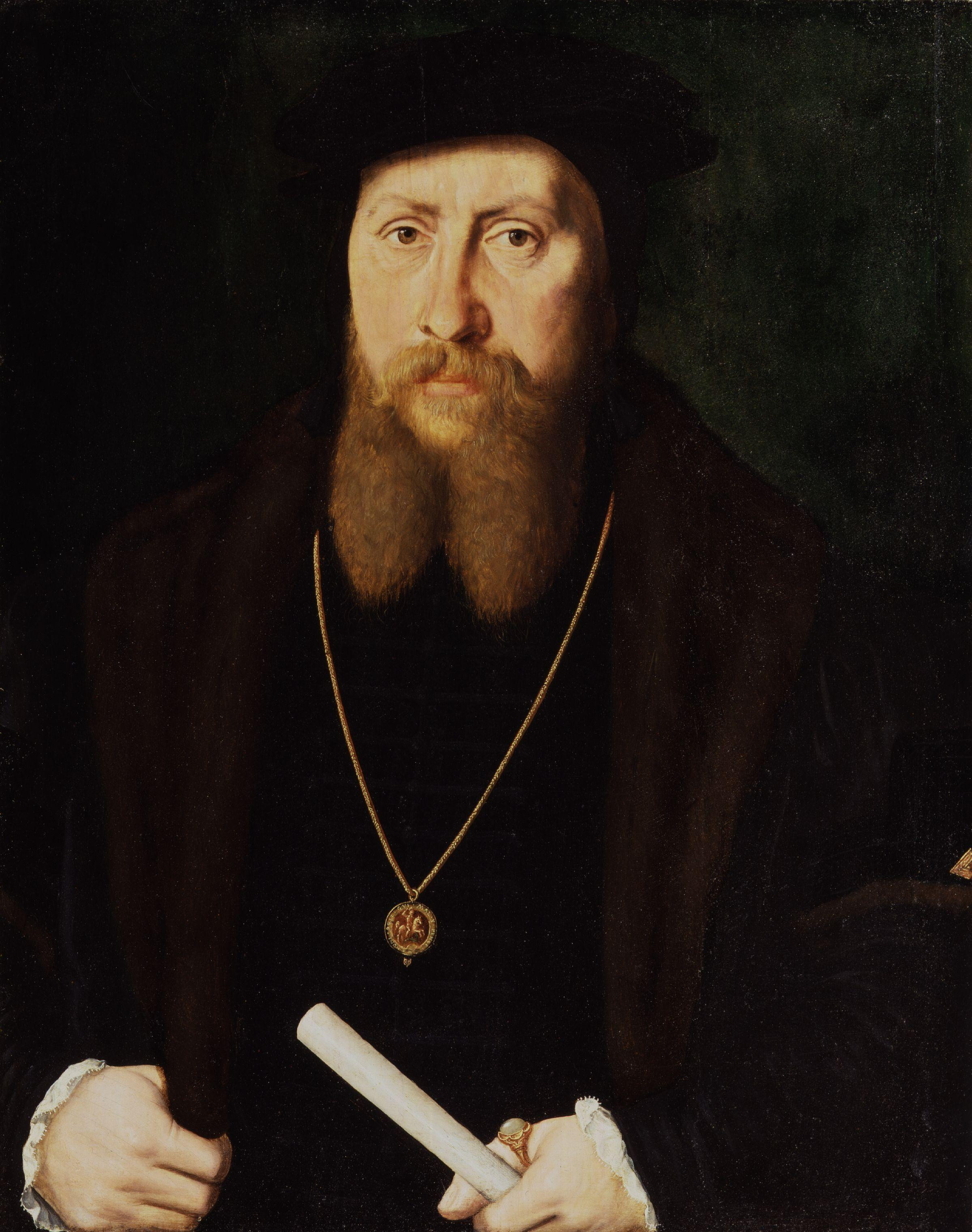
Portrait of William, Lord Paget, by the Master of the Stätthalterin Madonna

Cardinal Thomas Wolsey was not favourable to monasticism, at least as practised in the early 16th century, and at the outset of his Chancellorship in 1515 requested papal sanction to make visitations of all the monasteries in England. This was granted by Pope Leo X in 1518. In 1524, both Lord Chancellor and Archbishop of York, Wolsey proposed to suppress the Priory of St Frideswide, Oxford in order to fund a new, eighth college for Oxford University, named Cardinal College, in his own memory. In order to raise sufficient finance for the scheme, he proposed to suppress a number of other monasteries around the country and redirect their incomes to the college. In September 1524 Pope Clement VII issued a bull approving Wolsey's appropriation of further houses up to the value of 3000 ducats and letters patent were issued in line with the papal bull. At this point, the only Staffordshire houses named were Sandwell Priory and Canwell Priory. The royal assent for the scheme on 1 October 1524 also named Sandwell and possibly Canwell: the text is partly defaced. The dissolution of these male Benedictine houses went ahead with no mention of Farewell. However Wolsey, in his capacity as papal legate instituted a visitation of Lichfield in response to a complaint from the vicars about their working conditions and salaries, which forced upon Bishop Geoffrey Blythe a revision of Lichfield Cathedral's statutes. Hibbert places this in March 1526 but the Victoria County History dates it to 1527, which may be a confusion of Old Style and New Style dates. Hibbert considered that the visitation provided an occasion for Blythe to raise the condition of Farewell Priory with Wolsey. It is certain that the priory was dissolved in 1527 and the income granted to Lichfield Cathedral to support its choristers. The underlying reason for the dissolution seems to have been Wolsey's need to repay a debt he owed to Lichfield in connection with his college scheme.

Wolsey's commission for the suppression of Farewell was issued on 20 March 1527, having been approved by Henry VIII two days earlier, although an undated report of an inquisition into the priory has been placed in May 1526, possibly adding to the confusion about dates. The commission was addressed to Richard Street, Archdeacon of Salop, and William Clayborough, a canon of York Minster and a prominent lawyer. It specified that the nuns were to be transferred to other Benedictine houses and that the assets were to go to the dean and chapter of Lichfield Cathedral, in order to enrich the choristers. The dissolution took place on 13 April 1527. At this point the last prioress, Elizabeth Kilshawe, was seised of lands and properties valued at £33 6s. 8d. It seems that the planned transfer of the nuns went ahead. One of the nuns, Felicia Bagshawe, probably a native of Farewell manor, was sent to Black Ladies Priory, near Brewood. She was to continue at Black Ladies until it too was dissolved on 16 October 1538, receiving a lump sum of 20 shillings and subsequently allotted an annual pension of 33s. 4d. Prioress Elizabeth was transferred to Nuneaton Priory.

A formal grant of Farewell and all its possessions to the dean and chapter followed on 18 August 1527. The dean and chapter agreed to say an obiit annually for the bishop. Blythe's rôle in the dissolution is one of the key pieces of evidence for continuing episcopal patronage of Farewell: it seems that on dissolution it was taken for granted that it would revert to the diocese.

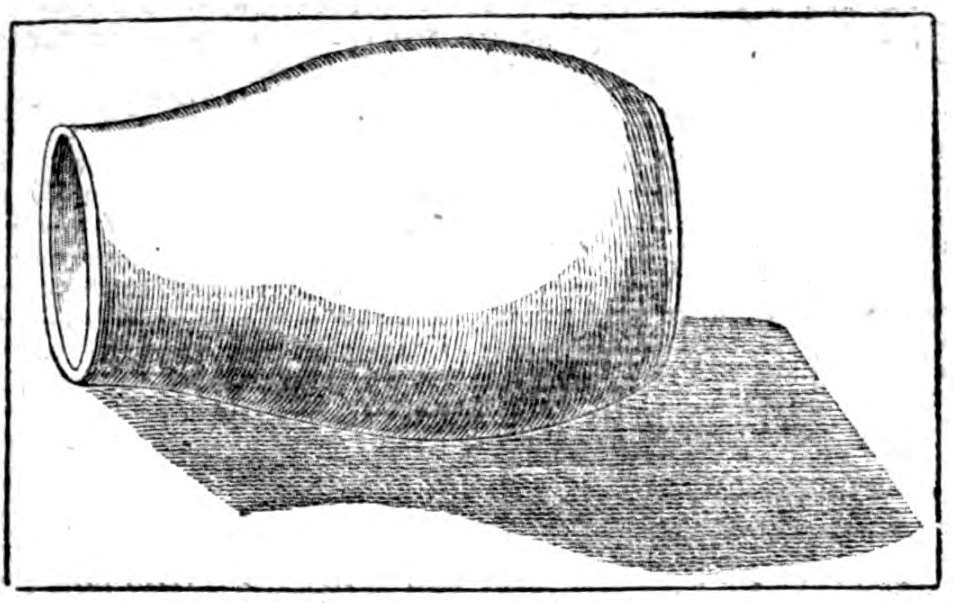
Sketch of an urn (acoustic jar) found in the south wall of Farewell parish church during renovation, c. 1747

In 1535 the Valor Ecclesiasticus put the value of the twelve choristers' endowment at almost £40. Rents from the former Farewell Priory estates contributed most of this, almost £25. The spiritualities of Farewell, notably the tithes, contributed a further £3 5s. 10d. And the profits of the leet court 10s. In 1550 the Dean and Chapter of Lichfield granted the lands of the former priory to William, Lord Paget. In 1564 his son and heir, Henry Paget, 2nd Baron Paget, used the legal device of fine of lands to register his right to the old priory lands, having himself sued by Richard Cupper and William Owen so that he could concede the estates and then have them made over to him in a perpetual grant. The properties fictitiously at issue consisted of:

the manors of Farewall and Chorley, and of 10 messuages, 6 cottages, 6 tofts, 10 gardens, a dovecote, 2 watermills, 300 acres of land, 10 acres of meadow, 400 acres of pasture, 20 acres of wood, 100s. of rent, and view of frankpledge in Farewalle, Chorley, Longdon, Pype, Homeryche, Curbugh, and Ocle, and of the rectory of Farewall, also of the tithes of sheaves, grain, hay, wool, lambs, and other small tithes in Farewall and Chorley.

The priory buildings seem to have disappeared by the 18th century. The parish church was altered greatly in the 1740s and restored again in the mid-19th century, leaving only the eastern end of the original structure, although there are also two ranges of misericords, dated about 1300, in the chancel and some 15th-century panel tracery. The 18th-century renovation brought to light three ranges of earthenware acoustic jars, presumably dating from the period of the priory. Three survived and a sketch of one was published in The Gentleman's Magazine in 1771.

== List of prioresses ==
The list is based on that in the Victoria County History account of the priory.

- Serena is known from the charter, dated 1248, in which she recognised the practical independence of Langley Priory in return for a pension of 4 marks.

- Julia was named as a prioress of the reign of Henry III when Radmore Abbey sued the priory.

- Maud was prioress probably in the early 1270s.

- Margery was holding office in 1293.

- Mabel died in 1313.

- Iseult of Pipe was elected in 1313 and resigned in 1321.

- Margaret de Muneworth was appointed in 1321 after a disputed election and sued for land at Elmhurst in 1353.

- Sibyl is mentioned in court proceedings initiated by Llanthony Priory in 1360 and seems to have held office in 1357, although the text is confusing and also seems to refer to an earlier Prioress Sybil.

- Agnes Foljambe was sued over land at Longdon around 1367.

- Agnes Turville resigned office in 1398.

- Agnes Kyngheley was elected prioress in 1398.

- Margaret Podmore died in 1425.

- Alice Wolaston was elected prioress in 1425. As late as 1462 she is known to have sued Elizabeth Shephard for taking an ox worth 40s.

- Anne is known from her admission to the guild of Lichfield in 1476.

- Elizabeth Kylshaw is first mentioned when admitted to the guild of Lichfield in 1523. She was prioress at the dissolution in 1527 and was then transferred to Nuneaton Priory.
