= List of monastic houses in Worcestershire =

Locations of monastic houses in Worcestershire
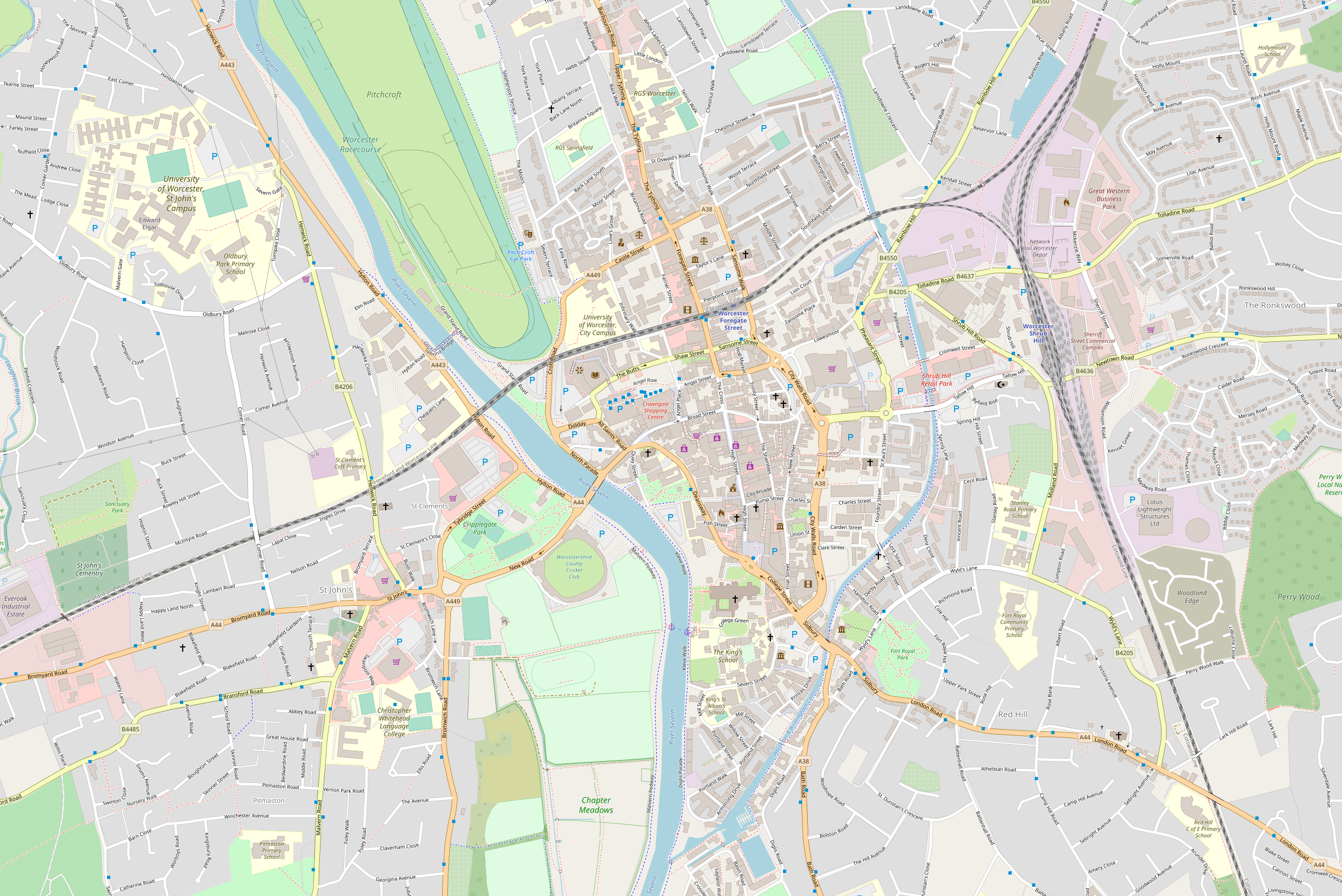
Locations of monastic houses in Worcester

The following is a list of the monastic houses in Worcestershire, England.

Alien houses are included, as are smaller establishments such as cells and notable monastic granges (particularly those with resident monks), and also camerae of the military orders of monks (Knights Templar and Knights Hospitaller). Monastic hospitals are included where they had the status or function of an abbey, priory, or preceptor/commandery.

Abbreviations and key

Status of remains
Symbol	Status
None	Ruins
*	Current monastic function
^{+}	Current non-monastic ecclesiastic function (including remains incorporated into later structure)
^	Current non-ecclesiastic function (including remains incorporated into later structure) or redundant intact structure
^{$}	Remains limited to earthworks etc.
^{#}	No identifiable trace of the monastic foundation remains
^{~}	Exact site of monastic foundation unknown
^{≈}	Identification ambiguous or confused

Locations with names in italics indicate possible duplication (misidentification with another location) or non-existent foundations (either erroneous reference or proposed foundation never implemented) or ecclesiastical establishments with a monastic name but lacking actual monastic connection.

Trusteeship
EH	English Heritage
LT	Landmark Trust
NT	National Trust

Foundation	Image	Communities & provenance	Formal name or dedication & alternative names	References & location
Alderminster		Saxon minster	Aldermannestun	
Astley Priory		Benedictine monks alien house: dependent on St-Taurin; founded before 1086 by Ralph de Todeni; dissolved 1414; granted to secular college of Westbury-upon-Trym; granted to Sir Ralph Sadler by Henry VIII	The Priory Church of Saint Peter, Astley	52°18′03″N 2°19′26″W
Beckford Priory		Saxon minster monks or secular collegiate founded before 803; probably absorbed into Worcester late-9th century; Augustinian Canons Regular alien house: dependent on Ste-Barbe-en-Auge, Normandy founded between 1128 and 1135, granted to Ste-Barbe-en-Auge by Henry I Rabellus, the chamberlain of Normandy; dissolved 1414; lands granted to Eton College 1443; granted to Sir Richard Lee 1547; known as 'The Manor'; mansion named 'Salesian House' (also known as 'Beckford Hall') built on site 17th century; now in use as Roman Catholic College; crypt alone remains of the monastic founded	St Barbara ____________________; Beckford Cell; Beccanford Priory	52°01′18″N 2°02′09″W
Blockley Monastery	Former county location. See entry under List of monastic houses in Gloucestershire			
Bordesley Abbey		Savignac monks — from Garendon, Leicestershire founded 22 November 1138-1147 by Waleran de Beaumont, Count of Meuland and Worcester land apparently granted by Queen Matilda 1136; Cistercian monks orders merged 17 September 1147; dissolved 17 July 1538; now in ownership of Borough of Redditch		52°19′00″N 1°56′02″W
Bredon Monastery ^{~}		Benedictine? monks founded c.717: land granted to Eanulf (grandfather of King Offa) by King Ethelbald before 717; apparently under Worcester by 844; destroyed in raids by the Danes late-9th century; mansion built 17th century allegedly on site	St Peter	52°01′21″N 2°07′05″W or 52°01′56″N 2°07′00″W (alleged)
Cookhill Priory ^		Cistercian nuns founded c.1180 (before 1198); founded(/rebuilt(?)) purportedly by Isabel, Countess of Warwick; dissolved 1538/9 remains incorporated into farmhouse and chapel 15th century		52°12′47″N 1°55′26″W
Daylesford Monastery	Former county location. See entry under List of monastic houses in Gloucestershire			
Dodford Priory		Augustinian Canons Regular priory cell founded 1184–6; incorporated into Premonstratensian house at Halesowen 1332; dissolved 1464; Premonstratensian Canons daughter house of Halesowen founded 1464, annexed by Halesowen; dissolved 1538	Blessed Virgin Mary	52°21′12″N 2°06′04″W
Droitwich Austin Friars ^{#}		Augustinian Friars (under the Limit of Lincoln) founded 1331, licence granted to Thomas Alleyn to build an oratory; dissolved 1538		52°16′14″N 2°08′37″W
Dudley Priory	Historical county location. See entry under List of monastic houses in the West Midlands			
Evesham Abbey ^{+}		Benedictine monks founded after/c.701 by St Egwyn, Bishop of Worcester; collegiate 941 to c.970; Benedictine monks restored c.970 to c.975; collegiate c.975 until c.995; Benedictine nuns with regular priests or brethren attached to the abbey from unknown date until after c.1086; Benedictine monks restored c.995 dissolved 17 November 1539 (January 1540); now within a public park	St Mary and St Egwin	52°05′28″N 1°56′48″W
Fladbury Monastery ^{#}		land granted to Oftfor, Bishop of Worcester by King Ethelred between 691 and 693; later under Evesham until 714; under Worcester until early-9th century; parochial c.888?; parish church of St John the Baptist built on site		
Great Malvern Priory ^{+}		Benedictine monks cell traditionally founded c.975 by Werstan; hermit settlement? founded before 1066; Benedictine monks founded c.1075 (1085); dependent on Westminster, Middlesex; dissolved 1539–40	The Priory Church of Saint Mary and Saint Michael, Great Malvern ____________________; Malvern Priory; Malvern Major	52°06′38″N 2°19′43″W
Halesowen Abbey	Historical county location. See entry under List of monastic houses in the West Midlands			
Hanbury Monastery		Saxon monastery land granted to Abbot Colman by King Wulfhere (657-674); merged into Worcester c.888?		52°15′55″N 2°03′36″W
Kempsey Monastery		Saxon monastery founded before 799 (?802); under Worcester by 799 (?802); manor granted to the bishop of Worcester 847		
Kidderminster		Saxon minster founded c.735, land granted to Cynebert by Æthelbald, King of Mercia 735; under Worcester by 777; dissolved after 816	Stour-in-Usmere Minster; Stourbridge Monastery	
Little Malvern Priory		Benedictine monks dependent on Worcester; founded c.1171 by Jocelin and Edred; dissolved c.1537; site now occupied by house named 'Little Malvern Court'	The Priory Church of Saint Giles, Little Malvern St Egidius ____________________; Malvern Minor Priory	52°03′41″N 2°20′13″W
Pershore Abbey ^{+}		secular canons collegiate founded c.689 by Oswald, nephew of Æthelred, King of Mercia; then secular canons and nuns; Benedictine monks founded 972, King Edgar replaced the seculars and nuns with Benedictines c.970, confirmed 972; dissolved 1539 (1539–40); granted to William and Francis Sheldon 1544/5; transepts and choir of conventual church retained for parochial use, continuing as the Parish Church	The Priory Church of Saint Mary the Virgin, Saint Peter and Saint Paul, Pershore The Priory Church of Saint Mary and Saint Eadburga, Pershore parochial portion also dedicated to the Holy Cross	52°06′37″N 2°04′39″W
Stanbrook Abbey		Benedictine nuns founded 1838; transferred to Wass, North Yorkshire 2009	The Abbey Church of Our Lady of Consolation, Callow End, Stanbrook	52°08′49″N 2°14′33″W
Westwood Priory		Fontefralt Benedictine nuns and brothers — double house alien house: cell dependent on Fontévrault; founded after 1154 (early in the reign of Henry II), land and other endowments granted by Osbert FitzHugh and his mother Eustacia de Say; Benedictine nuns appears to have become a regular Benedictine community after c.1374; became denizen: independent from before 1412(?); dissolved 1553; granted to John Pakinton 1538/9	The Priory Church of the Blessed Virgin Mary, Westwood	52°16′23″N 2°11′05″W
Whistones Priory, Barbourne		Cistercian nuns founded 1537-40 (before 1255) by Walter de Cantilupe, Bishop of Worcester; dissolved 1536; granted to Richard Callowhile 1543/4; largely demolished soon after dissolution	The Priory Church of Saint Mary Magdalene, Barbourne ____________________; The White Ladies, Aston; House of Mary Magdalene; White Ladies Nunnery	52°12′01″N 2°13′27″W
Witton Priory ^{+(?)} Droitwich		Augustinian Canons Regular founded c.1135 (late in the reign of Henry I or early in the reign of Stephen) by Peter Corbezun (later de Studley); transferred to Studley c.1151 by Peter Corbezun; conventual church possibly in parochial use as the Parish Church of St Peter-de-Witton	St Mary the Virgin ____________________; Witton St Peter by Droitwich Priory	52°15′38″N 2°08′41″W
Worcester Blackfriars		Dominican Friars (under the Visitation of Oxford) founded 1347 by William Beauchamp, Lord of Emley; dissolved 1538; surrendered to Richard Ingworth, Bishop of Dover; granted to the bailiffs and citizens of Worcester 1539/40		52°11′37″N 2°13′28″W
Worcester Friars of the Sack		Friars of the Sack founded before 1272; dissolved 1284		52°11′03″N 2°13′15″W
Worcester Greyfriars, earlier site		Franciscan Friars Minor, Conventual (under the Custody of Worcester) founded c.1226 transferred to new site (see immediately below) 1236/9		
Worcester Greyfriars		Franciscan Friars Minor, Conventual (under the Custody of Worcester) (community founded at earlier site (see immediately above) c.1226) transferred here 1236/9 by Charles of Warwick; dissolved 4 August 1538, surrendered to Richard Ingworth, Bishop of Dover; granted to the bailiffs and citizens of Worcester 1539/40; refectory/great hall in use as a gaol 1782		52°11′25″N 2°13′06″W
Worcester Penitent Sisters Friary		Penitent Sisters founded before 1240–1, oaks granted by Henry III; dissolution unknown		
Worcester Trinitarians?		Trinitarians no evidence for Trinitarians in Worcester (Note: Worcester Trinitarians - cited by W. Dugdale, Monasticon Anglicanum, vi p.1565; Victoria County Histories, A History of the County of Worcester: Volume 2, p. 173 indicates there is no evidence of Trinitarians in the city, Dugdale's reference in appears to be to the chantry of the Holy Trinity)		
Worcester Cathedral Priory ^{+}		Benedictine? monks and Benedictine? nuns founded before 743, received a grant from Æthelbald, King of Mercia; secular canons collegiate 9th century; Benedictine monks founded 969; monastic and episcopal diocesan cathedral built 983 by St Oswald; see transferred from St Peter's (see immediately below); dissolved 18 January 1540, monks expelled, replaced by secular canons; episcopal diocesan cathedral founded 1540; extant	The Cathedral and Priory Church of Saint Mary, Worcester The Cathedral and Priory Church of Saint Mary, Saint Peter, Saint Oswald and Saint Wulfstan (1218) The Cathedral Church of Christ and the Blessed Mary the Virgin of Worcester	52°11′19″N 2°13′15″W
Worcester Cathedral St Peter's Priory		Benedictine? monks and secular canons monastic and episcopal diocesan cathedral founded 680; secular canons 9th century to 969; see transferred to St Mary's (see immediately above) 969; Benedictine monks refounded 974–7		52°11′17″N 2°13′17″W

== See also ==
- List of monastic houses in England
