= Richard Ingworth =

Richard Ingworth may refer to:

- Richard Yngworth (died 1545), bishop of Dover from 1537
- Richard of Ingworth, Franciscan preacher who came to England in 1224
