= Nun's Well =

Things and places known as Nun's Well or St Nun's Well include:

- Nun's Well, Gibraltar
- Nun's Well, Cannock Wood
- Nun's Well, part of the nunnery adjoined to Greyfriars, Richmond
- Nun's Well at Sedgwick Castle
- St Nun's Well in Altarnun
- St Nun's Well in Pelynt
