= Charlecote =

Village in Warwickshire, England

Coordinates: 52°12′30″N 1°36′53″W

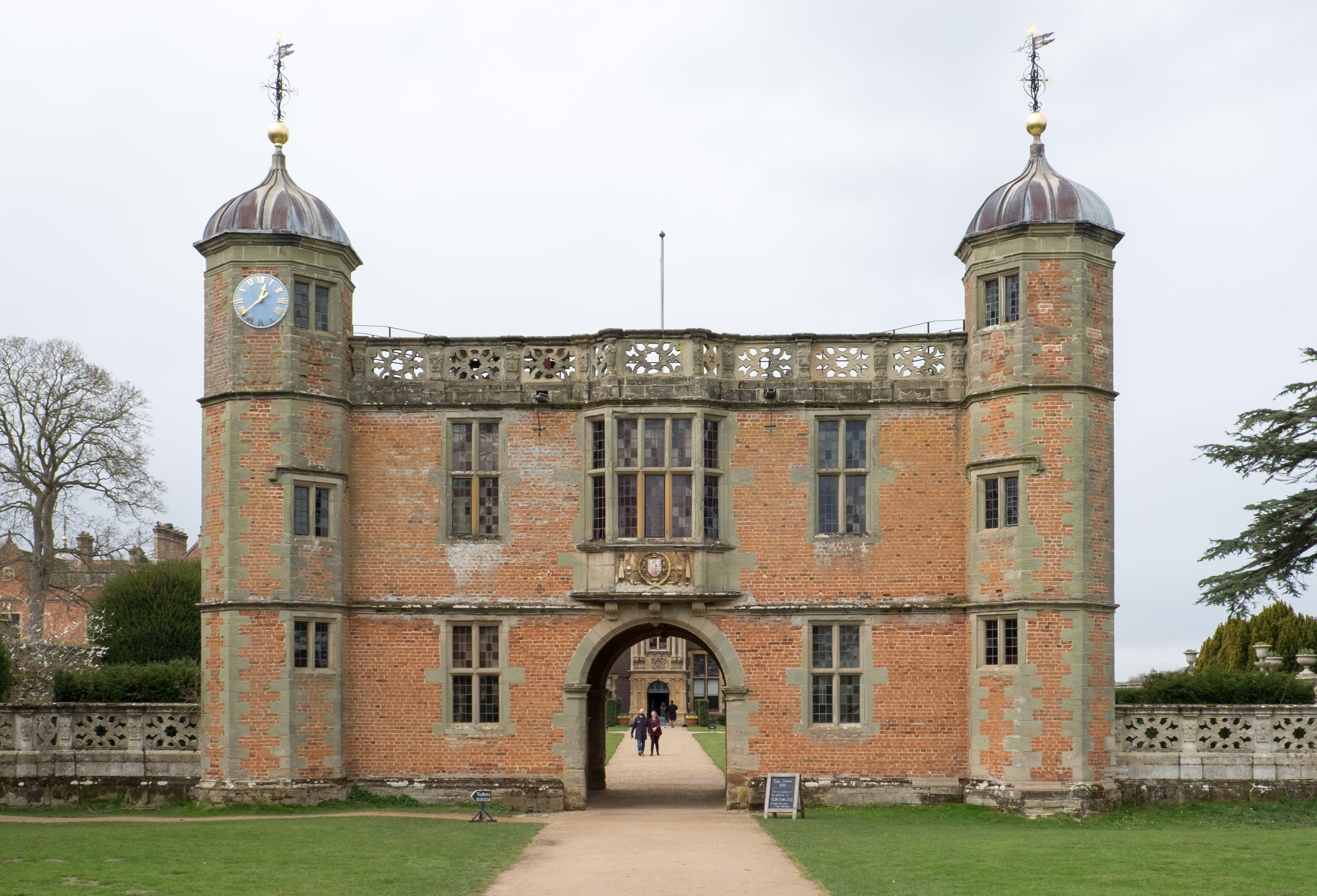
- Charlecote Park gatehouse

- Location within Warwickshire
- Area: 8.3448 km^{2} (3.2219 sq mi)
- Population: 194 (2011 census)
  - Density: 23/km^{2} (60/sq mi)
- OS grid reference: SP265568
- Civil parish: Charlecote
- District: Stratford-on-Avon
- Shire county: Warwickshire
- Region: West Midlands
- Country: England
- Sovereign state: United Kingdom
- Post town: WARWICK
- Postcode district: CV35
- Police: Warwickshire
- Fire: Warwickshire
- Ambulance: West Midlands
- UK Parliament: Stratford-on-Avon

Charlecote is a village and civil parish 5 miles (8.0 km) south of Warwick, on the River Avon, in the Stratford-on-Avon district, in the county of Warwickshire, England. In 2011 the parish had a population of 194. The parish touches Wasperton, Newbold Pacey, Wellesbourne and Walton, Stratford-upon-Avon, Loxley and Hampton Lucy. Most of the village is a conservation area. The soil is rich loam and lies on gravel and sand.

== Features ==
There are 39 listed buildings in Charlecote. Charlecote has a village hall, a 16th-century park called Charlecote Park and a church called St Leonard's Church which was entirely rebuilt in 1851. There are earthworks of a deserted medieval village called "Charlecote" in Charlecote Park. There was also possibly another deserted medieval village in the parish called Hunscote. The site of Thelsford Priory is in the parish.

== History ==
The name "Charlecote" means "Free peasants' cottage(s)". Charlecote was recorded in the Domesday Book as Cerlecote. On the 25th of March 1886 a part of Wellesbourne Mountford parish was transferred to the parish. "Charle Cot" is an alternative name from historical writing for "Charlecote", and "Charlcote" is an alternative name for the parish unit.
