= St Mary's Church, Temple Balsall =

Parish church in West Midlands, England

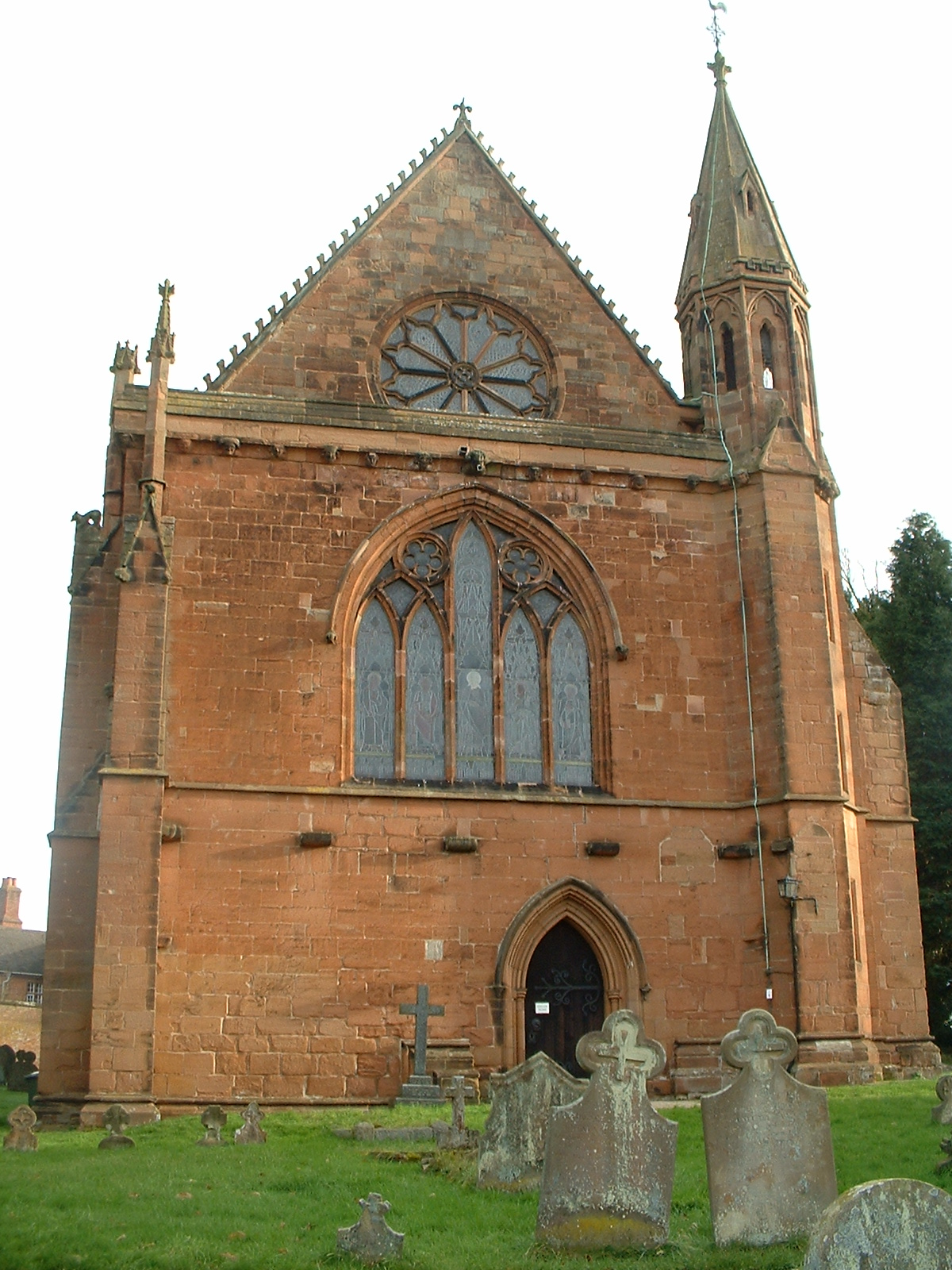
- St Mary's Church, Temple Balsall
- St Mary's Church, Temple Balsall
- 52.3816°N 1.6974°W
- Denomination: Church of England
- Churchmanship: Anglo Catholic

History
- Dedication: St Mary

Administration
- Province: Canterbury
- Diocese: Birmingham
- Parish: Temple Balsall

Clergy
- Vicar: Revd Debbie Collins

St Mary's Church, Temple Balsall is a parish church in the Church of England in Temple Balsall, Solihull, West Midlands, England.

== History ==
The church is of 13th century style but was heavily restored by Sir George Gilbert Scott in 1849. The church is a Grade I listed building.

It is thought that the church was built by the Knights Templar and is the Mother Church of the Templars and the Knight Hospitallers. Knights of both Orders are illustrated in the Altar window.

== Organ ==
The church has a small pipe organ by Porritt of Leicester, which was restored and revoiced by the late Peter Collins 2012–2014. A specification of the organ can be found on the National Pipe Organ Register.

== See also ==
- Balsall Preceptory
