= Stafford Friary =

Friary in Staffordshire, England

Monastery information
- Other name: The Franciscan Friars of Stafford
- Order: Franciscan
- Established: 13th Century
- Disestablished: 1538

Site
- Location: Stafford, Staffordshire, England

Stafford Friary was a religious house of Franciscan friars in Stafford, Staffordshire, England. Founded sometime in the 13th century, it was a surrendered to the Crown in 1538, during the Dissolution of the Monasteries.

== History ==
=== Foundation and early history ===
Whilst the date of foundation is not known for certain, the friary was in existence by 1274, when it is recorded that the Bishop of Lichfield and Coventry granted 20 days' indulgence to anyone who visited the friary and said the Lord's Prayer and the Hail Mary in the name of the king. The founder of the friary is uncertain, but it may have been a member of the Stafford Family, local landowners. Edmund de Stafford, 1st Baron Stafford was buried in the friary church in 1308, instead of the usual family burial place at Stone Priory.

The friary, always remaining relatively small, is listed as under the custody of Worcester in an official list of "provinces, custodies and houses" compiled at a general chapter held in Perpignan, France in 1331. The house received a sum of 6s. 8d in the wills of Isabel de Sutton and Justice of the Peace Roger Horton.

=== Dissolution ===
The house was suppressed by the Crown, in what is known as the Dissolution of the Monasteries, in 1538. The friars seemed to have surrendered the house willingly and an inventory of goods and chattels was taken by Richard Ingworth, Bishop of Dover. By this point the friary was relatively poor, with rents only amount to £1 6s. 8d but with debts of £4. A sale of the buildings and goods was held in September 1538, raising a total of £34 3s. 10d. The lead and bells were sold separately, for £45 and £10 respectively. What was left of the friary was pulled down in 1644, as parts of efforts to defend the town during the Civil War.
