= Farewell and Chorley =

- Civil parish
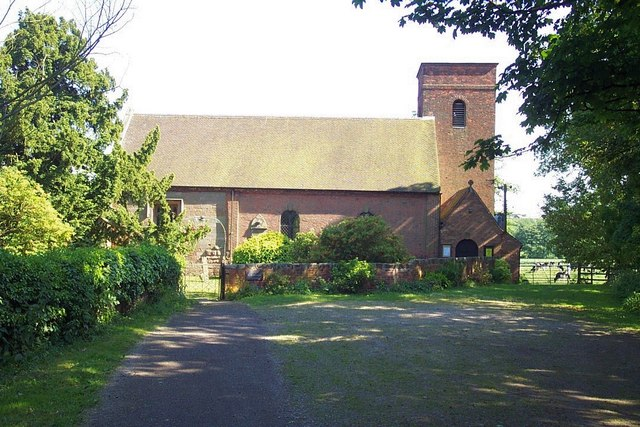
- St Bartholomew's Church in Farewell
- Interactive map of Farewell and Chorley
- Coordinates: 52°42′N 1°53′W
- Country: England
- Primary council: Lichfield
- County: Staffordshire
- Region: West Midlands
- Status: Parish
- Main settlements: Farewell, Chorley

Government
  - Type: Parish Council, with Curborough and Elmhurst
  - UK Parliament: Lichfield

Farewell and Chorley is a civil parish in Lichfield District, Staffordshire, England. The villages of Farewell and Chorley, that make up the parish, lie 3 or 4 miles north-west of the City of Lichfield. The parish council is a joint one with Curborough and Elmhurst.

Farewell Priory was founded by Roger de Clinton, Bishop of Lichfield and Coventry, (1129 – 48).

The parish church of St Bartholomew was rebuilt in brick in 1745, with the exception of the stone chancel. There was further restoration in 1848 when the church was re-roofed. The church is a Grade II* listed building for its surviving medieval fabric and fittings.

== See also ==
- Listed buildings in Farewell and Chorley
