= Temple Balsall =

Hamlet in West Midlands, England

Coordinates: 52.382°N 1.697°W

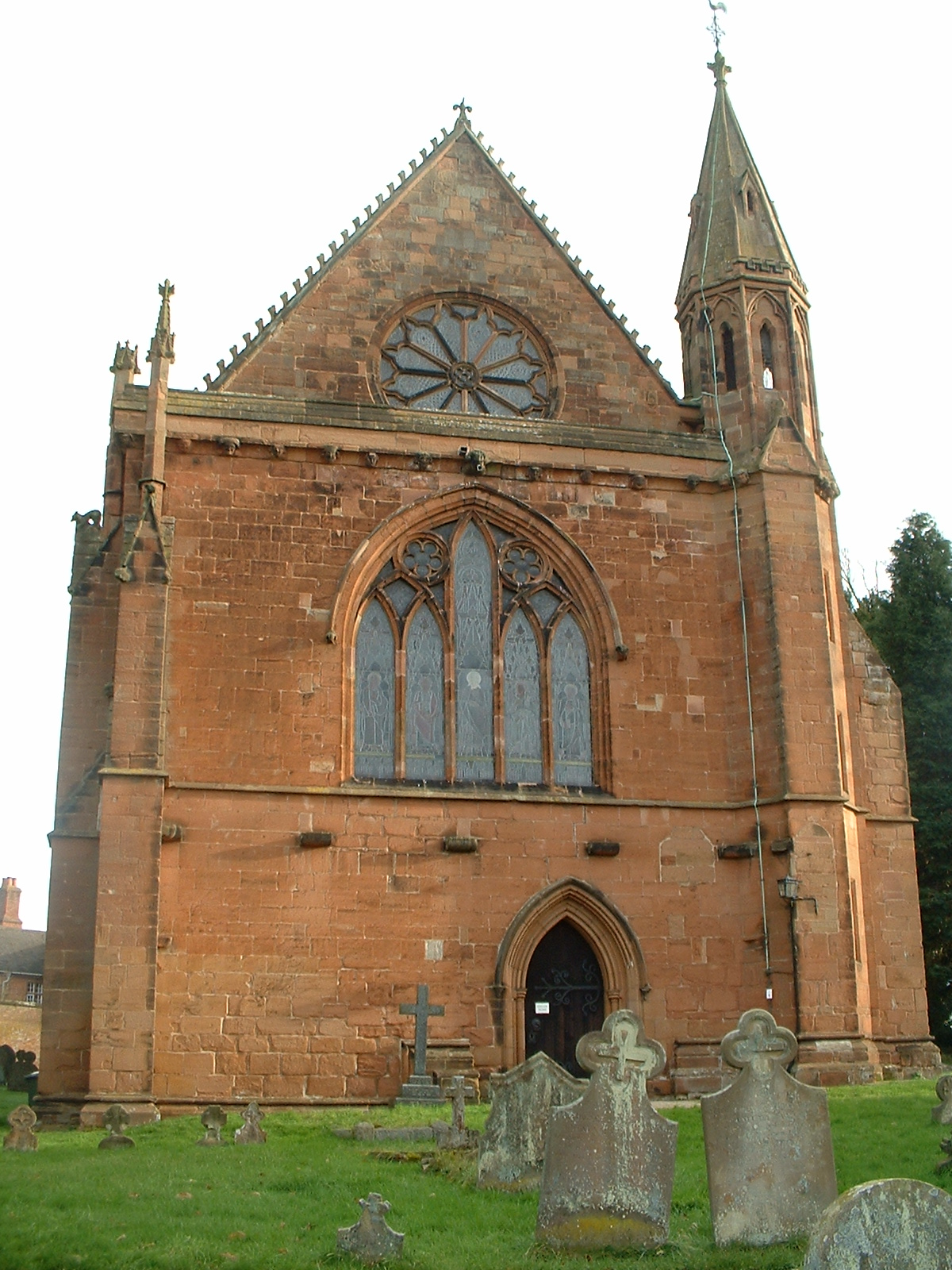
- Church of St Mary

- Location within the West Midlands
- Civil parish: Balsall
- Metropolitan borough: Solihull
- Metropolitan county: West Midlands
- Region: West Midlands
- Country: England
- Sovereign state: United Kingdom
- Police: West Midlands
- Fire: West Midlands
- Ambulance: West Midlands

Temple Balsall (grid reference SP207760) is a village in the civil parish of Balsall, in the Metropolitan Borough of Solihull in the English West Midlands, situated between the large villages of Knowle (where population details as taken at the 2011 census can be found) and Balsall Common. It was formerly in Warwickshire and is on a notoriously bad series of bends on the B4101 Kenilworth Road.

It is one of the oldest and most interesting sites in the borough. It is named after, and dates from the time of, the Knights Templar. They farmed about 650 acres (2.6 km^{2}) of the estate in the 12th century, and established Balsall Preceptory where a number of brothers lived and ran the estate. After the Order was suppressed, the estate was given to the Knights Hospitaller of St John. They lost it when Henry VIII dissolved the monasteries and Queen Elizabeth I gave the estate to Robert Dudley. The 13th-century church and Old Hall, and 17th-century almshouses survive.

Robert Dudley's granddaughter, Lady Katharine Leveson of Trentham Hall, Staffordshire, inherited the estate. On her death in 1674, Lady Leveson left endowments for almshouses, the Lady Katharine Leveson primary school and the local church. There are only a handful of residences in the hamlet.
