= List of monastic houses in the West Midlands (county) =

Locations of monastic houses in West Midlands
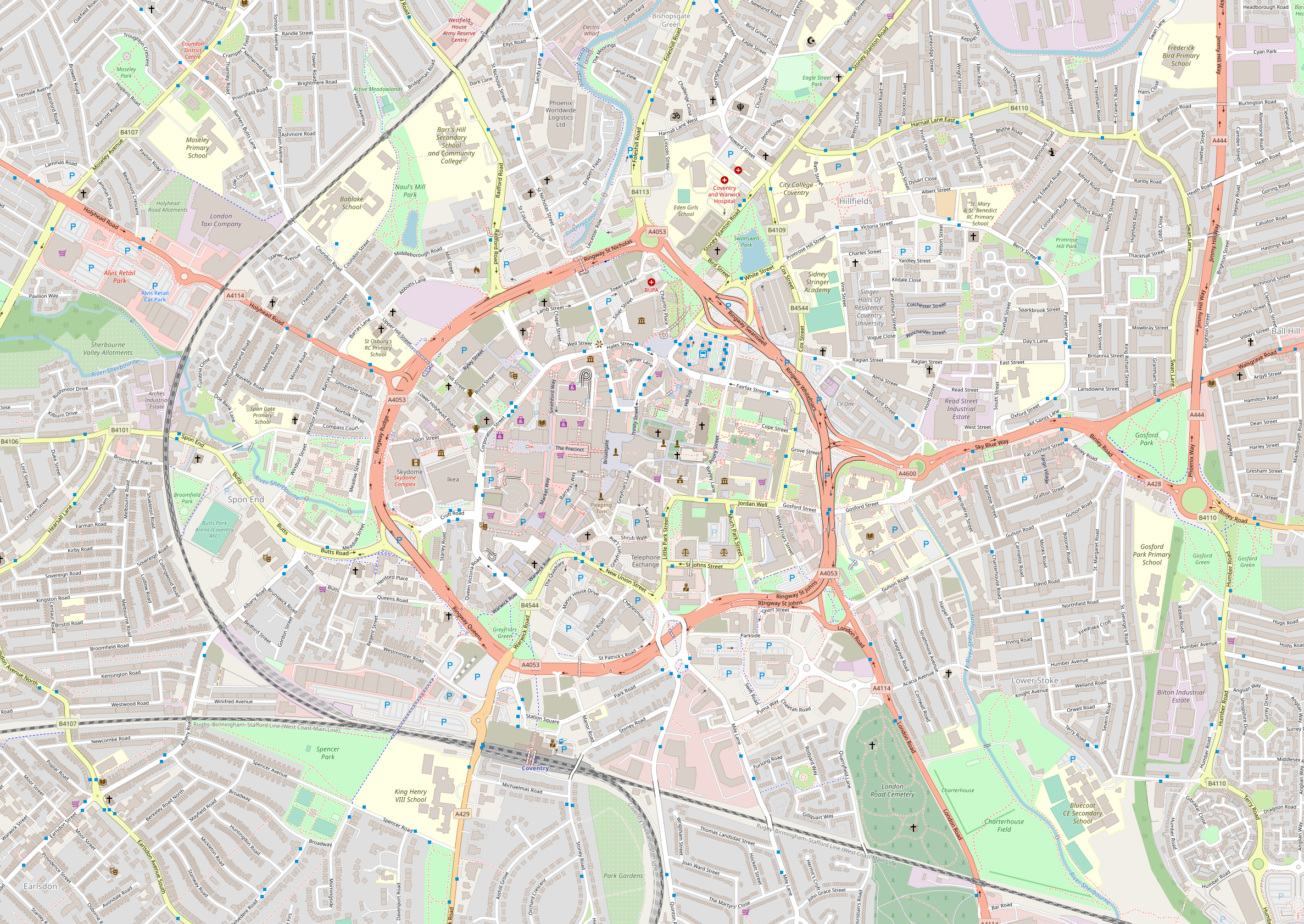
Locations of monastic houses in Coventry

The following is a list of the monastic houses in the West Midlands, England.

Alien houses are included, as are smaller establishments such as cells and notable monastic granges (particularly those with resident monks), and also camerae of the military orders of monks (Knights Templar and Knights Hospitaller). Monastic hospitals are included where they had the status or function of an abbey, priory, or preceptor/commandery.

Abbreviations and key

Status of remains
Symbol	Status
None	Ruins
*	Current monastic function
^{+}	Current non-monastic ecclesiastic function (including remains incorporated into later structure)
^	Current non-ecclesiastic function (including remains incorporated into later structure) or redundant intact structure
^{$}	Remains limited to earthworks etc.
^{#}	No identifiable trace of the monastic foundation remains
^{~}	Exact site of monastic foundation unknown
^{≈}	Identification ambiguous or confused

Locations with names in italics indicate possible duplication (misidentification with another location) or non-existent foundations (either erroneous reference or proposed foundation never implemented) or ecclesiastical establishments with a monastic name but lacking actual monastic connection.

Trusteeship
EH	English Heritage
LT	Landmark Trust
NT	National Trust

Foundation	Image	Communities & provenance	Formal name or dedication & alternative names	References & location
Balsall Preceptory	^{+}	Knights Templar founded 1146 (c.1142) (during the reign of King Stephen) by Roger Mowbray; preceptory before 1226; dissolved 1308–12; Knights Hospitaller 1322; dissolved 1470, jointly with Grafton; granted to Sir Robert Dudley 1565/6; became part of the holdings of the prior of the order in England 1476; became ruinous; restored 1622; in use as chapel for the local almshouse 1677; church became parochial 1863; now under trusteeship of The Foundation of Lady Katherine Leveson, with public access by arrangement	church: The Church of Saint Mary the Virgin ____________________; Temple Balsall; Balsall and Grafton Preceptory; Balshall Preceptory	52°22′54″N 1°41′50″W
Coventry Greyfriars		Franciscan Friars Minor, Conventual (under the Custody of Worcester) founded before 1234 by Ralph, Earl of Chester; dissolved 5 October 1538; granted to the Mayor and bailiffs of Coventry 1542/3		52°24′21″N 1°30′41″W
Coventry — St Anne's Priory ^		Carthusian monks — from London Charterhouse, Middlesex and Beauvale founded 1381 by William, Lord Zouch, of Harrington; dissolved 16 January 1539; granted to Richard Andrews and Leonard Chamberlain 1542/3	The Priory Church of Saint Anne, Coventry	52°24′04″N 1°29′41″W
Coventry — St Mary's Priory		purported Saxon nunnery destroyed by in raids by the Danes 1016; Benedictine monks founded 1043(?) by Leofric, Earl of Mercia and his wife Lady Godiva: papal confirmation 1043; abbatial-episcopal diocesan cathedral priory founded 1102: see transferred from Chester; dissolved 15 January 1539: see transferred to Lichfield	The Priory Church of Saint Mary, Saint Peter and Saint Osburg, Coventry	52°24′32″N 1°30′31″W
Coventry Whitefriars		Carmelite Friars friary proposed 1287, forbidden; founded 1342, built by Sir John Poultney, citizen of London and five times Lord Mayor; dissolved 1 October 1538; granted to Ralph Sadler 1544/5	St Mary	52°24′51″N 1°30′06″W
Dudley Priory		Cluniac monks alien house: dependent on Wenlock Priory, Shropshire; founded 1149-60 by Gervase Pagnell (Painell), carrying out the intentions of his father Ralph, lord of the manor; became denizen: independent from 1395; dissolved 1539; granted to Sir John Dudley 1540/1;site now located in public Priory Park	The Priory Church of Saint James, Dudley	
Halesowen Abbey		Premonstratensian Canons — from Welbeck, Nottinghamshire founded 1218 by Peter des Roches, Bishop of Winchester, (charter 1215), manor granted by King John 1214, canons arrived 1218; dissolved 9 June 1538; remains of abbey church and cloister in use as barn on Manor Abbey Farm; (EH)	The Abbey Church of the Blessed Virgin Mary and Saint John the Evangelist, Halesowen	52°26′37″N 2°02′13″W
Henwood Priory ^{#}		Benedictine nuns founded 1154-9 (during the reign of Henry II, under Walter Durdent, Bishop of Chester (Coventry)) by Ketelberne (Katelbern) de Langdon; dissolved 1536; granted to John Higford 1539/40	The Priory Church of Saint Margaret, Henwood ____________________; Heanwood Priory	52°24′21″N 1°43′47″W
Sandwell Priory		hermitage before 1180; Benedictine monks founded c.1190 (Note: Sandwell — founded 1190: W. Dugdale, Monasticon Anglicanum;) (c.1180 (Note: Sandwell — founded 1180: Victoria County History: A History of the County of Stafford: Volume 3, p.216)) by William, son of Guy de Offney; dissolved 1524 (7 June 1525 (Note: Sandwell — dissolution 7 June 1525: T. Tanner, Notitia Monastica, Preface, p.xxxv))	The Priory Church of Saint Mary Magdalene, Sandwell	52°31′13″N 1°57′53″W
Wolverhampton Carmelite Monastery *		Carmelite nuns extant		52°34′11″N 2°08′47″W
Wolverhampton Monastery (?) ^{+}		Saxon monks founded 659? traditionally by Wulfhere, King of Mercia; possibly refounded 994 by Lady Wulfran, land granted to Wulfgeat, kinsman of Lady Wulfran, by King Edgar, confirmed by Sigeric, Archbishop of Canterbury; secular collegiate founded c.994 possibly on the site of earlier monastery; dissolved 1538; restored 1852-65 by Ewen Christian	St Mary St Peter	52°35′13″N 2°07′41″W

== See also ==
- List of monastic houses in England
