= Newcastle-under-Lyme Friary =

Friary in Newcastle-under-Lyme, England

Monastery information
- Other name: The Dominican Friars of Newcastle-under-Lyme
- Order: Dominican
- Established: 13th Century
- Disestablished: 1538

Site
- Location: Newcastle-under-Lyme, Staffordshire, England

Newcastle-under-Lyme Friary was a religious house of Dominican friars in Newcastle-under-Lyme, Staffordshire, England. Founded sometime in the 13th century, it was a surrendered to the Crown in 1538, during the Dissolution of the Monasteries.

== History ==
=== Foundation and early history ===
Whilst the date of foundation is not known for certain, the friary was in existence by at least July 1277, when records show Edward I, then resident in nearby Eccleshall, sent alms of 6s 8d for "one day's food in the ensuing week". The house received two early endowments in its early years from local patrons. In 1280, Nicholas de Audley, 1st Baron Audley left the friars £8 8s 6d in his will and Eleanor of Provence, consort of Henry III, gave them the sum of £5.

Sometime between 1351 and 1361, Henry of Grosmont, 1st Duke of Lancaster, whose duchy held the rights to the property, released the friars from their annual rent of 3s 9d and awarded them a grant of land to extend the house. This grant was confirmed by John of Gaunt, Duke of Lancaster in 1363 and Henry IV, in his capacity as Duke of Lancaster, in 1404. Despite this close Lancastrian connection, this is no evidence to suggest the friars were involved politically with the faction during the ensuing Wars of the Roses.

=== Dissolution ===
In 1538 the house was suppressed by the Crown as part of the Dissolution of the Monasteries. By this point the friary was in a poor state, being described by Richard Ingworth, Bishop of Dover as "all in ruin and a poor house, the choir leaded and the cloister lead ready to fall down, the rest slate and shingle". The house received some 40 shillings annual in rents and had debts totaling £14. The inventory taken at this time by the bishop reflects the poverty of the friary. Most of the house's goods were old or of inferior quality. A sale following the suppression raised £3 11s. 2d for the goods and chattels, £7 6s. 8d for building materials and a further 12s. 4d for the lead. The majority of the property was let to local landowners, John Smith and Henry Broke.
