= Warmington Priory =

Monastic foundation in Warwickshire, England

Warmington Priory was a Benedictine priory or more probably a cell in Warmington, Warwickshire, England. It was apparently founded by the monks of Préaux Abbey in Normandy after Henry de Newburgh, earl of Warwick, gave them his lands in Warmington in the reign of Henry I of England. Whatever its initial status, by the 14th century it was a cell of Toft Monks Priory in Norfolk, which similarly belonged to Préaux Abbey. After the dissolution of the alien priories by Henry V it was granted in 1428 to the Carthusians of Witham Charterhouse in Somerset.
