= Listed buildings in Farewell and Chorley =

Farewell and Chorley is a civil parish in the district of Lichfield, Staffordshire, England. It contains 13 buildings that are recorded in the National Heritage List for England. Of these, two are listed at Grade II*, the middle of the three grades, and the others are at Grade II, the lowest grade. The parish contains the villages of Farewell and Chorley, and is otherwise rural. Most of the listed buildings are houses, cottages, farmhouses and farm buildings. The other listed buildings are a church, memorials in the churchyard, and a former corn mill.

== Key ==
Grade	Criteria
II*	Particularly important buildings of more than special interest
II	Buildings of national importance and special interest

== Buildings ==
Name and location	Photograph	Date	Notes	Grade
St Bartholomew's Church; 52.70223°N 1.87827°W		c. 1300	The oldest part of the church is the chancel, the rest of the church dating from 1745, and it was restored in the mid 19th century. The chancel is built in stone, and the rest of the church is in red brick. The church consists of a nave, a chancel, and a west tower with a south porch. The tower has a string course, and a plain parapet with a cornice, and it contains round-headed bell openings, and a gabled porch with a round-arched entrance.	II*
Ashmore Brook Farm; Cross in Hand Lane; 52.69590°N 1.86071°W	—	16th century	The farmhouse was later altered and extended. The original hall range was timber framed and later encased in brick, the extensions are in brick, and the roof is tiled. There are two storeys and an H-shaped plan. The garden front has two bays, and contains a canted bay window and a sash window. In the angle between the hall range and a cross-wing is a porch with a moulded surround, a flat hood and an embattled parapet. Most of the other windows are casements.	II
Abnalls Cottage, Abnalls Lane; 52.68912°N 1.85714°W	—	17th century	The house was partly refaced in the 18th century. It is timber framed with brick infill, the refacing and extension are in brick, and it has a tile roof. There are two storeys and an attic, two bays, and a lower extension on the right. The windows are casements, those in the ground floor with segmental heads.	II
Farewell Hall; 52.70246°N 1.87991°W		Early 18th century	A large farmhouse in red brick with raised floor bands, a dentilled eaves cornice, and a hipped tile roof. It consists of a main block and two short recessed single-bay wings. The main block has a cellar, two storeys and an attic, and five bays. In the centre is a doorway with a fanlight and a pediment, the windows are transomed casements, and above there are hipped dormers.	II*
Farewell Manor; 52.70313°N 1.87942°W	—	Mid 18th century	A red brick farmhouse with string courses, and a tile roof. There are two storeys and an attic, and a T-shaped plan, with a front of three bays, and a rear wing. The windows are casements, and there is a blind segmental-headed opening.	II
The Hill Farmhouse, Ford Lane; 52.69617°N 1.87705°W	—	Mid 18th century	The farmhouse was altered and extended in the 19th century. It is in red brick with a cogged, dentilled and canted eaves course, and a tile roof with verge parapets. There are two storeys and an attic, and a complex T-shaped plan. On the east is a gabled range, to the left is a flush wing, and to the right is a recessed two-bay wing. The doorway has a round head, and the windows are casements, one with a segmental head.	II
High House Farm, Dodds Lane; 52.69932°N 1.90211°W	—	Late 18th century	A red brick farmhouse with a dentilled eaves course and a concrete pantiled roof. There are three storeys, an L-shaped plan, and a front of two bays. The windows are casements, those in the lower two floors with segmental heads.	II
Lower Lane Farmhouse and barn 52.69677°N 1.90079°W	—	Late 18th century	The farmhouse and barn are in red brick, with a cogged eaves course and a tile roof. The house to the left has two storeys and four bays, and contains a doorway with a segmental head, and casement windows, those in the ground floor with segmental heads. The barn to the right contains a stable door and two loft openings.	II
Brown Memorial and enclosure 52.70235°N 1.87841°W	—	1781	The memorial is in the churchyard of St Bartholomew's Church, and is to the memory of John Brown. It is a chest tomb in stone, and has moulded inscribed sides and a top slab. The tomb is enclosed by railings on a plinth, they are about 1 metre (3 ft 3 in) high, and have spearhead rails and urn standards at the angles.	II
Ashmall Memorial and enclosure 52.70230°N 1.87807°W	—	1810	The memorial is in the churchyard of St Bartholomew's Church, and is to the memory of Robert Ashmall. It is a pedestal tomb in stone, on a square base with two moulded steps. The tomb contains oval inscription plaques, a fluted frieze, and a fluted urn finial. The tomb is enclosed by railings on a stone plinth, they are about 1.5 metres (4 ft 11 in) high, and have urn standards at the centre and the angles, and spearheads elsewhere.	II
Ashmore Brook Farmhouse, Cross in Hand Lane; 52.69687°N 1.85957°W	—	Early 19th century	A red brick farmhouse with a dentilled eaves course and a tile roof. There are two storeys and an attic, and a T-shaped plan, with a front of three bays. In the centre is a flat-roofed porch, and the windows are small-pane casements.	II
Mill, The Mill Farm; 52.70208°N 1.87475°W	—	Early 19th century	A former corn mill in red brick with a stepped eaves course and a tile roof. There are two storeys and an attic, and two bays. The entrance and the windows, which are cast iron casements, have segmental heads. The wheel is missing, but the machinery remains.	II
The Croft, Ford Lane; 52.69770°N 1.89478°W	—	Early 19th century	A red brick house, with angle pilasters surmounted by plain capitals, and a tile roof. There are two storeys and an attic, and three bays. In the centre is a gabled porch, above which is a blind opening with a segmental head. In the outer bays are three-light casement windows.	II
