= Beckford Priory =

Monastery in Worcestershire, England

Coordinates: 52.021633°N 2.035740°W

Beckford Priory was a medieval house of Augustinian Canons, historically within Gloucestershire, presently in Worcestershire, England. It was dissolved in 1547 and laicized. The main building was converted as a residence in the 16th century as Beckford Hall and was rebuilt in the early 17th century. Currently divided into five dwellings, it served as a Roman Catholic college in the 20th century.

== History ==
It was founded in Beckford in or shortly after 1128 as a dependency of the priory of Sainte-Barbe-en-Auge in Normandy. It was taken into the King's hand in 1414 as an alien priory and granted in 1462 to Eton College, but was re-granted by Edward IV to the collegiate church of Fotheringay. In 1547 the college was suppressed (although the church itself continued), and the site passed into lay ownership. A new house, known as Beckford Hall, was built in the 16th century as the seat of the Wakeman family on the former premises (of which only the crypt remains). The house was used in the 20th century as a Roman Catholic college until 1975. It is a Grade II-listed building.

== Description ==
The seven-bay, two-storeyed building is built from "coursed dressed limestone rubble and limestone ashlar with ashlar dressings". Behind the parapet is the multi-gabled roof with large ashlar chimney stacks behind the main ridge of the roof. The building has a cellar and an attic with seven gabled dormers with parapets and drip moulds; each two-light window has mullions. Skylights are set between each dormer. The three-light windows on the main floors have chamfered mullions, transoms and dripmoulds.
