= Nun's Well (Cannock Wood) =

Coordinates: 52.7031°N 1.9388°W

Nun's Well is a spring just inside the village of Cannock Wood in Staffordshire, England, at the base of the Mercia Mudstone Group. There is no evidence that nuns ever lived there, and the name appears to originate in the grant of part of Cannock Chase by Henry II to a priory at Farewell. Slag remains, possibly of a bloomery, have been found there.
