= Curborough and Elmhurst =

- Civil parish
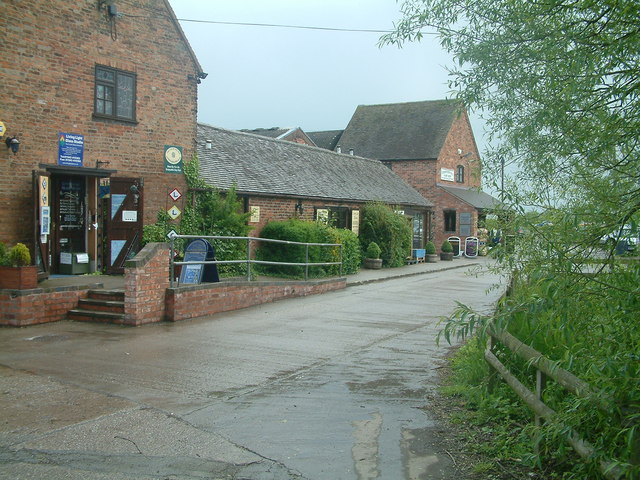
- Interactive map of Curborough and Elmhurst
- Coordinates: 52°42′30″N 1°49′30″W
- Country: England
- Primary council: Lichfield
- County: Staffordshire
- Region: West Midlands
- Status: Parish
- Main settlements: Curborough, Elmhurst

Government
  - Type: Parish Council, with Farewell and Chorley
  - UK Parliament: Lichfield

Population (2011)
  - Total: 203

Curborough and Elmhurst is a civil parish in Lichfield District, Staffordshire, England. The hamlets of Curborough and Elmhurst, that make up the parish, lie just north of the City of Lichfield, and are separated from each other by the West Coast Main Line. The parish council is a joint one with Farewell and Chorley. Curborough's name derives from Old English. The words for mill stream in Old English were 'cweorn burna,' and likely referred to Curborough brook.

== Geography ==
The northern, eastern and southern boundaries of Curborough and Elmhurst run along Full, Curborough and Circuit Brooks, the western boundary runs partly along Bilson Brook, and partly along the A51. The eastern part of Curborough, on the east side of Curborough Brook, is in Fradley and Streethay civil parishes, on the boundary of those parishes after they split on 1 April 2023.

The subsoil is Keuper Marl (Mercia Mudstone) with a band of Keuper Sandstone (Bromsgrove Sandstone) along the western boundary. There are stretches of Alluvium along Full, Curborough and Bilson Brooks. The land lies at its highest in the south where Binns Farm stands at 387 ft (118m). It falls away steeply on the north to Bilson Brook. On the east it slopes down more gently to 246 ft (75m) on the northern boundary near New Farm and to 231 ft (70m) on the eastern boundary at Curborough Farm.

== History ==
An early resident of Curborough was Dr. Zachary Babington, prebendary of Curborough in 1584 and later precentor of Lichfield Cathedral and diocesan chancellor. Babington built an estate called Curborough Hall, where he died in 1613. His son William, a lawyer married to Ellen (Littleton) Babington, succeeded him to Curborough Hall estate and farm, and was in turn succeeded by a son Zachary, a lawyer with a practice at Lichfield. The Curborough Hall estate later fell to three heiresses of the Babington family, one of whom married Theophilus Levett, town clerk of Lichfield, whose son John Levett, briefly an MP inherited the home. By 1925, the last of the Levett heirs, Theophilus Basil Percy Levett, sold the farm out of the family.
