= Cannock Wood =

Village and civil parish in England

Coordinates: 52.708539°N 1.934595°W

- Location within Staffordshire
- Population: 1,031 (2011)
- OS grid reference: SK044123
- Civil parish: Cannock Wood
- District: Cannock Chase
- Shire county: Staffordshire
- Region: West Midlands
- Country: England
- Sovereign state: United Kingdom
- Post town: RUGELEY
- Postcode district: WS15
- Dialling code: 01543
- Police: Staffordshire
- Fire: Staffordshire
- Ambulance: West Midlands
- UK Parliament: Cannock Chase

Cannock Wood is a village and civil parish in the Cannock Chase district of Staffordshire, England. The village is situated around 4 miles (6.4 km) east of Cannock, the same distance south of Rugeley, and 2 miles (3.2 km) north of Burntwood. According to the 2011 Census, the parish had a population of 1,031, a decrease from 1,052 in the 2001 Census.

Cannock Wood makes up part of Cannock Chase which is a recognised Area of Outstanding Natural Beauty.

Its mainly residential area is interspersed with open areas including various parks and public footpaths through the local countryside. The village hosts tourist attractions including Castle Ring, an ancient fort, and Nun's Well.

Cannock Wood also hoststwo pubs, The Park Gate Inn and The Redmore. There is also a village hall, a children's play area and a cricket club.

Most children living in Cannock Wood between the ages of 4 and 11 attend primary school in the neighbouring hamlet of Gentleshaw.

== Twin towns ==
Cannock Wood and the surrounding district are twinned with

- Datteln, Germany

== See also ==
- Radmore Abbey
