= Elmhurst, Staffordshire =

Village in Staffordshire, England

Coordinates: 52.707°N 1.833°W

Elmhurst
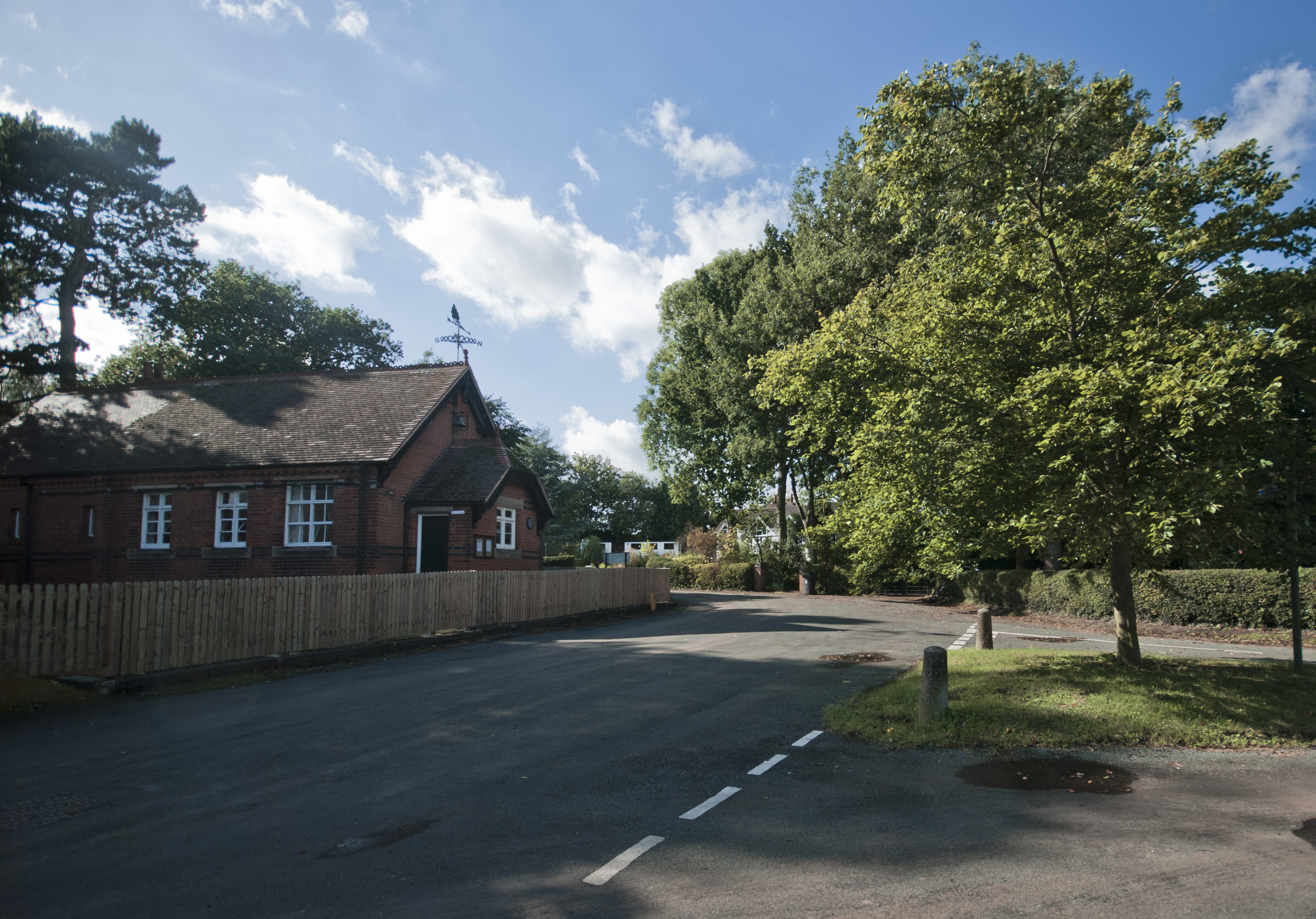
- Population: 313
- OS grid reference: SK109123
- Civil parish: Curborough and Elmhurst
- District: Lichfield
- Shire county: Staffordshire
- Region: West Midlands
- Country: England
- Sovereign state: United Kingdom
- Post town: LICHFIELD
- Postcode district: WS13
- Dialling code: 01543
- Police: Staffordshire
- Fire: Staffordshire
- Ambulance: West Midlands

Elmhurst is a small village in Curborough and Elmhurst civil parish within Lichfield District, in Staffordshire, England. It lies approximately 1.5 miles north of Lichfield.

The village is rural in nature, consisting of a few farms and a small number of private houses. It was once the site of Elmhurst Hall, a large country residence which hosted King Edward VII when he visited Lichfield for the centenary of the Staffordshire Yeomanry in 1894.

== See also ==
- Category:People from Elmhurst, Staffordshire
