= Astley Priory =

Monastery in Astley, Worcestershire, England

Coordinates: 52.300677°N 2.324042°W

Astley Priory was a Benedictine priory in Astley, Worcestershire, England.

It was founded in the 11th century, probably by Ralph de Todeni, as a cell subject to the abbey of St. Taurinus, Evreux, in France. Around 1300 the priory acquired Astley church, but in 1384 was bought by Sir John Beaumont, an esquire of the chamber, and its use for religious purposes came to an end. When John Beaumont was attainted in 1386, his lands were forfeit and Astley passed to Thomas de Beauchamp, 12th Earl of Warwick. In 1414 the priory was again confiscated by the crown as an alien monastery.

In 1468, King Edward IV, at the request of the Archbishop of Canterbury, donated the priory or manor of Astley in perpetuity to the dean and college of Holy Trinity, Westbury-on-Trym, Gloucestershire. At the Dissolution of the Monasteries in 1538 it was granted by King Henry VIII to Sir Ralph Sadleir.

The only visible remains of the priory today are the Prior's Well, near the entrance of the St Peter's churchyard and a fragment of walling at the east end of the churchyard.
