= Cessavit =

A cessavit was a writ in English law, originating in Stat. 6 Edw. I., given by statute to recover lands when the tenant has for two years failed to perform the conditions of his tenure. It was abolished in 3 and 4 Wm. IV. The forms and species of this writ were various; such as, cessavit de cantaria, cessavit de feodifirma, and cessavit per biennium.

An example can be seen in a Plea Roll of the Court of Common Pleas, in 1430, where Robert Gryttone, abbot of Colchester St John, is suing Nicholas Peke. The words can be seen in the third line as "p. biennium iam cessavit".
