= Pinley Priory =

Former Cistercian nunnery in Warwickshire, England

Coordinates: 52°17′22.6″N 1°41′16.8″W

Pinley Priory, also called Pinley Abbey, was a Cistercian nunnery in the parish of Rowington in Warwickshire, England. It was founded in the early 12th century and dissolved in 1536.

The site of the priory is now occupied by the lands and buildings of Pinley Abbey Farm, and only traces now survive of the original priory buildings. The present Pinley Abbey Farmhouse, a Grade II* listed building, dates from the mid 15th century with later alterations. It incorporates part of a wall believed to have been part of an earlier monastic building, that also extends beyond it. To the north-west there is a cottage, originally 14th century but also later altered, that was probably once the priory guest house, also Grade II* listed. Various surviving earthworths, and re-used bits of masonry worked into later buildings, give further clues to the original complex.
