= Wootton Wawen Priory =

Benedictine priory in Wootton Wawen, Warwickshire, England

Wootton Wawen Priory was an alien priory in Wootton Wawen, Warwickshire, England.

== History ==
Not long after the Norman conquest Robert De Stafford gave the church of Wootton with a hide of land nearby and another hide at 'Doversele' to the Benedictine Abbey of St. Peter de Castellion of Conches in Normandy which had been established in 1035 by his father, Roger de Tonei. They established a small alien priory here a prior and one monk constituted its community and the church was re-dedicated to St Peter in Chains. In 1398 Richard II gave the priory to the Carthusians at Coventry, but the grant was reversed soon after by Henry IV and the monks re-established. At the time of the Dissolution of the Monasteries it was bestowed with all its possessions on 12 December 1443 upon the Provost and Scholars of King's College, Cambridge, and on 30 November 1447 the Abbey of Conches released all title to the Priory to the college, in whose hands the manor still remains. No trace of the priory buildings remains but they stood between the churchyard and the ancient fishpool which lies near the Henley Road.

Despite being a small cell, life was not all peaceful. At the start of the reign of Edward I, Peter de Altaribus was prior, His life was anything but creditable, and he became involved in a brawl which brought about the interference of the bishop. The circumstances are related with considerable detail in the episcopal registers of Bishop Gifford of Worcester. An inquisition was held at Warwick on Tuesday after Palm Sunday, 1281, to hear the dispute between Peter de Altaribus, and brother Roger his monk. William the vicar of Wootton, had been summoned to the priory to stop the brawl, and on arrival he met the prior coming out of the hall door whilst inside he found brother Roger sitting in a chair with his nose bleeding. The prior accused Roger of wounding himself in his nose with his own finger; whereas Roger claimed the prior had hit him on the nose, which was corroborated by others who added that Roger did not return the blow. The argument was over Peter's withdrawal of distributions to the poor, lack of hospitality, wasting the priory's goods, and drunkenness. Both were found guilty and excommunicated which after appeal they were absolved and recalled to the monastery of Conches, to receive punishment from their abbot. It is exceptional to find an alien priory subject to diocesan visitation, but this small priory was also visited by Bishop Giffard in 1269, 1284, and 1290.
