= Richard of Ingworth =

13th-century Franciscan preacher in England

Richard of Ingworth was a Franciscan preacher who was influential in introducing the order to England.

== Biography ==
He first appears with the other friars who came with Agnellus of Pisa to England in 1224, and is said to be the first Franciscan to preach north of the Alps. When he arrived in England, he was not young, and had already been a priest for some time. Ingworth was responsible for the establishment of the first Franciscan house in London, and his efforts were greatly responsible for their first convents, in Northampton and in Oxford, where Ingworth served as custodian for a time.

In 1230, due to the absence of Agnellus, he acted as the English Province's vicar during a general chapter meeting in Assisi, where he was appointed provincial minister of Ireland by John Parenti. Ingworth gave up this position in 1239, during the generalship of Albert of Pisa, to take a pilgrimage to the Holy Land, during which he died.
