= Henwood Priory =

Nunnery in Warwickshire, England

Henwood Priory, also known as Estwell Priory, was a Benedictine nunnery in Warwickshire, now in Solihull in the West Midlands, England.

It was probably founded around 1154–1161, although possibly as early as 1149 under Walter Durdent, Bishop of Chester and Coventry by Ketelberne de Langdon and it had confirmation of papal privilege from Pope Gregory IX in 1228. It was extended in 1232, but was in ruins by the early 1530s, and was ransacked and destroyed further by Henry VIII in 1536 during the Reformation. The site was granted to John Higford around 1539/40.

A house called Henwood Hall was built here, which was demolished in 1824. A later farmhouse nearby is also called Henwood Hall and has remains of the priory buildings incorporated into its walls. Otherwise there are no built remains, but the site retains traces of a moat and various ground irregularities which probably mark the spoil left from demolition. A small excavation in 1950–51 uncovered part of the foundations of the priory church.

The site where the priory once stood is supposedly haunted by 12 nuns, out of a community of 15, including the prioress (Mother Superior) Millicent de Fokerham, who by 19 August 1349 had died from the Black Death, but the supposed ghosts have not been seen since 1976.
