= Baswich Priory =

Priory in Staffordshire, England

Coordinates: 52.8037°N 2.0747°W

Baswich Priory was a priory in Staffordshire, England. It was founded in 1174 and dissolved in 1538. The current entrance to Priory Farm is likely on the site of the medieval entrance to the precinct. The site is now in the civil parish of Tixall, in the Stafford district.
