= Grafton Preceptory =

Priory in Temple Grafton, Warwickshire, England

- Location within Warwickshire

Monastery information
- Order: Knights Hospitalier
- Established: 12th century
- Disestablished: 1540

Site
- Location: Temple Grafton, Warwickshire
- Coordinates: 52.18833°N 1.81667°W

Grafton Preceptory was a priory in Temple Grafton, Warwickshire, England that belonged to the Knights Hospitalier. The village had no connection with the Knights Templer, but acquired this name due to an administrative error during the reign of Henry VIII, by which time the Hospitaliers had been associated with the site for over three hundred years. The Preceptory was closely associated with Balsall Preceptory and the office of Preceptor for these two was often united.
