= Toft Monks Priory =

Priory in Norfolk, England

Toft Monks Priory was a priory at Toft Monks, Beccles, Norfolk, England. It included St Margarets, Toft Monks and St Mary, Haddiscoe

Revenues from the "manor of Toft, with the tithe of 'Cerlentone' and 'Posteberies,' and the churches of those two towns" were given to Préaux Abbey, in Les Préaux, Normandy in 1099 by Robert of Meulan, later the first Earl of Leicester.
