= Thelsford Priory =

Coordinates: 52.2217°N 1.6048°W

Thelsford Priory is a site listed by the Historic Buildings and Monuments Commission for England.

Thelsford Priory was a small house, originally of the Order of the Holy Sepulchre, located near the banks of the River Avon close to the Warwick to Wellesbourne road. It was colonised from the Priory of the Holy Sepulchre in nearby Warwick.

It was a house of Trinitarian friars and was founded at the beginning of the thirteenth century. It was dedicated to God, St. John the Baptist and St. Radegund. A grant was made between 1200 and 1212 by Henry and Isabel de Beresford which gave the church of nearby Barford mentions canons, indicating the priory may have begun life as a house of the short-lived Order of the Holy Sepulchre.

In 1214 the house was granted 13 acres of land adjacent to the house and further land nearby by Sir William Lucy of Charlecote. He also granted the advowson of Charlecote church and half a virgate of land. He expressed a wish that the house should be used not only as a priory but also as a hospital for the relief of the local poor and for the use of pilgrims.

Sir William's grandson Fulk Lucy gave the friars permission to enclose the road which passed between the church and habitation. A later Sir William Lucy gave them a further two acres of land adjacent to the priory precinct. William de Nasford, lord of Barford, granted further lands and the advowson of Barford church. He also granted three virgates of land which became known as the Free Hide which were exempt from secular service. He also granted fishing rights on the A Richard Malore granted lands at Kirkby in Leicestershire together with the advowson of the church there. He also gave them the chapels at Shilton and Packington. A further benefactor was William de Beauchamp, Earl of Warwick who granted three parcels of land. Roger de Charlecote gave lands and tenements at Heathcote. These and other smaller gifts enabled the priory to expand the conventual buildings and a larger church to be built.

The new church and churchyard were consecrated by Bishop Giffard on the Feast of the Translation in 1285. In 1312 during the priorship of Simon de Charlecote the house was involved in a scandal which resulted in the prior and brethren being excommunicated. Their crime was the fabrication of letters of Pope Clement. The bishop of Worcester issued a commission to the deans of Hampton and Warwick to publicly absolve the house.

November 1329 saw Edward III, then staying at nearby Kenilworth, confirming a large number of small grants to Prior Thomas de Offyngton and the brethren. A few years later, in 1332, Prior Thomas de Offyngton was granted a licence to acquire lands and rents in mortmain to an annual value of 10 marks. Two years later they gained in a similar fashion protection for three years to collect alms. This was gained by virtue of an indulgence granted by the Pope to the Trinitarian order. May 1337 saw the house having confirmation of a number of small grants in mortmain on the payment of a fine of 1 mark.

A description of the interior of the church at the time of the dissolution survives and makes interesting reading. Dr London wrote to Cromwell in the capital stating that the house was "in much ruin" and that the church was "little and unfinished". At the eastern end of the church was an image known locally as the "Maiden Cutbroghe". This statue had a wooden trough beneath her feet which extended into the altar (which was hollow). The image was said to be effective in the cure of headaches. Dr London wrote, "Thither resorted such as had headache or had any slottich widow locks, viz., hair grown together in a tuft. There must they put a peck of oats into the trough, and when they were once slid under the altar the friars stole them out from behind, and the sick must pay a penny for a pint of these Maiden Cutbrogh oats, and then their heads should ache no more till the next time."

== Dissolution and After ==
The religious life of the priory came to an end on 26 October 1538 when Prior Edmund David and three other members of the house signed the surrender document passing ownership of the house to the King. Following its surrender the church was demolished and much of the stone was reused in other structures, mainly at Thelsford Farm and Wasperton Manor. The priory ponds and other low-lying areas of the site were backfilled with debris and the area was turned over to grazing.

The site of the priory was excavated in the 1960s and again in 1972. These digs provided much information about the layout of the buildings and other features of the priory. Many of these features still survive underground. The thirteenth-century church was cruciform in plan but the original building was a single-celled rectangular building which was extended in the early fourteenth century. This buildings foundations still survive below ground. The cloisters and its associated buildings were located on the south side of the church. They were largely of timber construction. The western range was built of timber on stone footings which still survive below ground. The areas to the north and west of the claustral buidongs were bounded by walls and probably served as gardens. Apart from the claustral complex itself several areas of buildings have been found within the precinct, particularly in the western part of the site. These structures probably relate to the hospital and pilgrim structures.

There are no visible remains of this long-forgotten priory. Part of the site lies below the main A429 road a little to the north of Thelsford Farm.

Incomplete list of priors

- Elias 1247
- Robert temp. r. Edward I
- Henry 1309
- Simon de Charlecote 1312
- Thomas de Offyngton 1328
- Thomas de Charlecote 1353
- William de Clarindon temp. r. Richard II
- Robert Bowston occurs 1440
- Robert Bolton 1473
- Roger Lynton 1474
- John Brokeden 1492
- Robert Brokeden 1513
- Edmund Alcester 1535
- Edmund David 1538
