= Radmore Abbey =

Abbey in Staffordshire, England

Monastery information
- Order: Cistercian
- Established: c.1143
- Disestablished: c.1153
- Dedication: Virgin Mary

People
- Founders: Empress Matilda, King Stephen of England

Site
- Location: Cannock Wood, Staffordshire, England
- Public access: Yes

Radmore Abbey was a cistercian abbey near Cannock Wood, Staffordshire, England, which is located north of Burntwood and south of Rugeley. Originally a hermitage, the abbey did not exist for long, being exchanged for lands in Warwickshire after little more than ten years.

== History ==
The abbey began as a hermitage, set up in the early 1130s by King Stephan, near the hamlet of Cannock Wood. This grant was confirmed by Roger de Clinton, Bishop of Coventry and Lichfield, who gave the hermits permission to follow a rule of their choosing. Around 1143, the hermits secured a similar charter from Empress Matilda. In doing so, they were presumably trying to secure their future whatever the result of the civil war. The hermits joined the Cistercian order sometime in the 1140s, dedicating their abbey to Saint Mary. Several grants, including land in Staffordshire and Warwickshire, were made to the abbey and in 1153 Matilda's son, Henry, Duke of Normandy and Aquitaine, became a benefactor.

The abbey only lasted until the winter of 1154, when the monks petitioned the Henry, now king Henry II, for grant of land on another site. Because of disputes with local foresters, the monks were finding Radmore increasingly unsuitable. The king exchanged the royal manor at Stoneleigh, Warwickshire for the abbey and the monks established Stoneleigh Abbey in June 1155, with Radmore becoming a royal hunting lodge.
