= Balsall Preceptory =

Manor that was given to the Knights Templars

Coordinates: 52°22′52.97″N 01°41′46.56″W

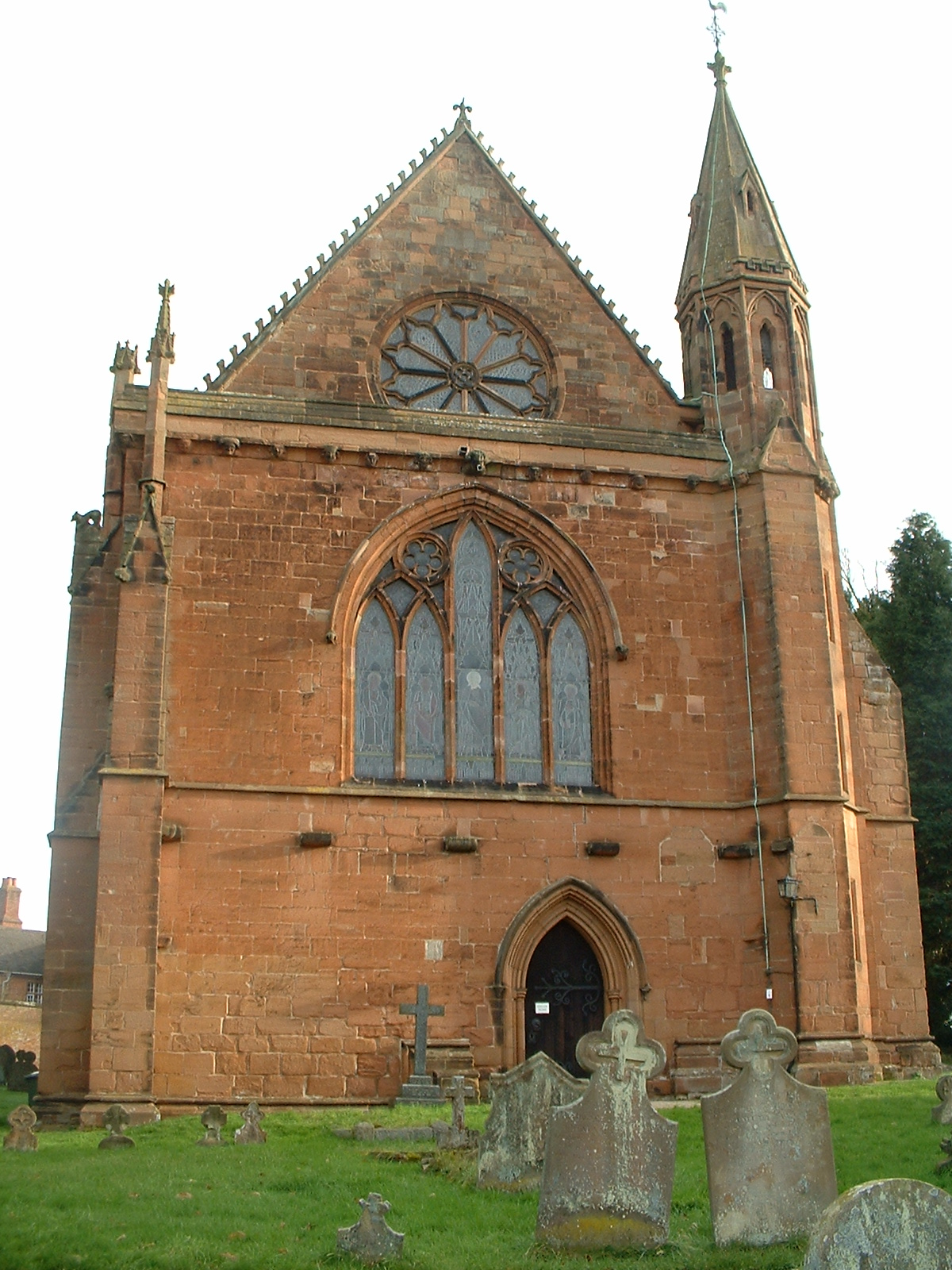
Church of St Mary, the former preceptory chapel

Balsall Preceptory in Warwickshire was a manor that was given to the Knights Templars in recognition of their service in the Crusades. The donor, according to a survey of the Templars' possessions in England in 1185, was Roger de Mowbray, son of Nigel d'Aubigny.

The preceptory also governed other Templar lands, similarly donated for services in the Holy Land. These included:

- Chilverscoton
- Cubbington
- Fletchampstead Hermitage
- Herdwicke Harbury
- Sherbourne
- Studley
- Temple Tysoe
- Warwick; and
- Wolvey.

Old Hall, though much restored, dates from the time of the Templars occupation. At the time of the suppression of the Order, eight Balsall resident Templars were arrested, namely:

- John de Coningeston
- Thomas le Chamberlayn
- William de Burton
- William de Warewyk (chaplain)
- Robert de Sautre
- Roger de Dalton; and
- John de Euleye.

== See also ==
- Temple Balsall
- St Mary's Church, Temple Balsall
