= Richard Yngworth =

Tudor Bishop of Dover

Richard Ingworth or Richard Yngworth, prior of Langley, was appointed Bishop of Dover under the provisions of the Suffragan Bishops Act 1534 in 1537, a post he held until his death eight years later. As Bishop of Dover, Yngworth acted as the agent for Henry VIII and Thomas Cromwell in obtaining the surrender of the friaries; as part of the suppression of the monasteries, nunneries and friaries of England and Wales.
