= Lists of monastic houses in the United Kingdom =

The list of monastic houses in the United Kingdom is organised by country:

== General list ==
- List of monastic houses in England
- List of monastic houses in Scotland
- List of monastic houses in Wales
- List of monastic houses on the Isle of Man

== England ==
- List of monastic houses in Buckinghamshire
- List of monastic houses in Bedfordshire
- List of monastic houses in Berkshire
- List of monastic houses in Bristol
- List of monastic houses in Cambridgeshire
- List of monastic houses in Cheshire
- List of monastic houses in Cornwall
- List of monastic houses in Cumbria
- List of monastic houses in Derbyshire
- List of monastic houses in Devon
- List of monastic houses in Dorset
- List of monastic houses in County Durham
- List of monastic houses in the East Riding of Yorkshire
- List of monastic houses in East Sussex
- List of monastic houses in Essex
- List of monastic houses in Gloucestershire
- List of monastic houses in Greater London
- List of monastic houses in Greater Manchester
- List of monastic houses in Hampshire
- List of monastic houses in Herefordshire
- List of monastic houses in Hertfordshire
- List of monastic houses on the Isle of Wight
- List of monastic houses in Kent
- List of monastic houses in Lancashire
- List of monastic houses in Leicestershire
- List of monastic houses in Lincolnshire
- List of monastic houses in Merseyside
- List of monastic houses in Norfolk
- List of monastic houses in North Yorkshire
- List of monastic houses in Northamptonshire
- List of monastic houses in Northumberland
- List of monastic houses in Nottinghamshire
- List of monastic houses in Oxfordshire
- List of monastic houses in Rutland
- List of monastic houses in Shropshire
- List of monastic houses in Somerset
- List of monastic houses in South Yorkshire
- List of monastic houses in Staffordshire
- List of monastic houses in Suffolk
- List of monastic houses in Surrey
- List of monastic houses in Tyne and Wear
- List of monastic houses in Warwickshire
- List of monastic houses in West Sussex
- List of monastic houses in the West Midlands (county)
- List of monastic houses in West Yorkshire
- List of monastic houses in Wiltshire
- List of monastic houses in Worcestershire
