= List of monastic houses in Cheshire =

Locations of monastic houses in Cheshire
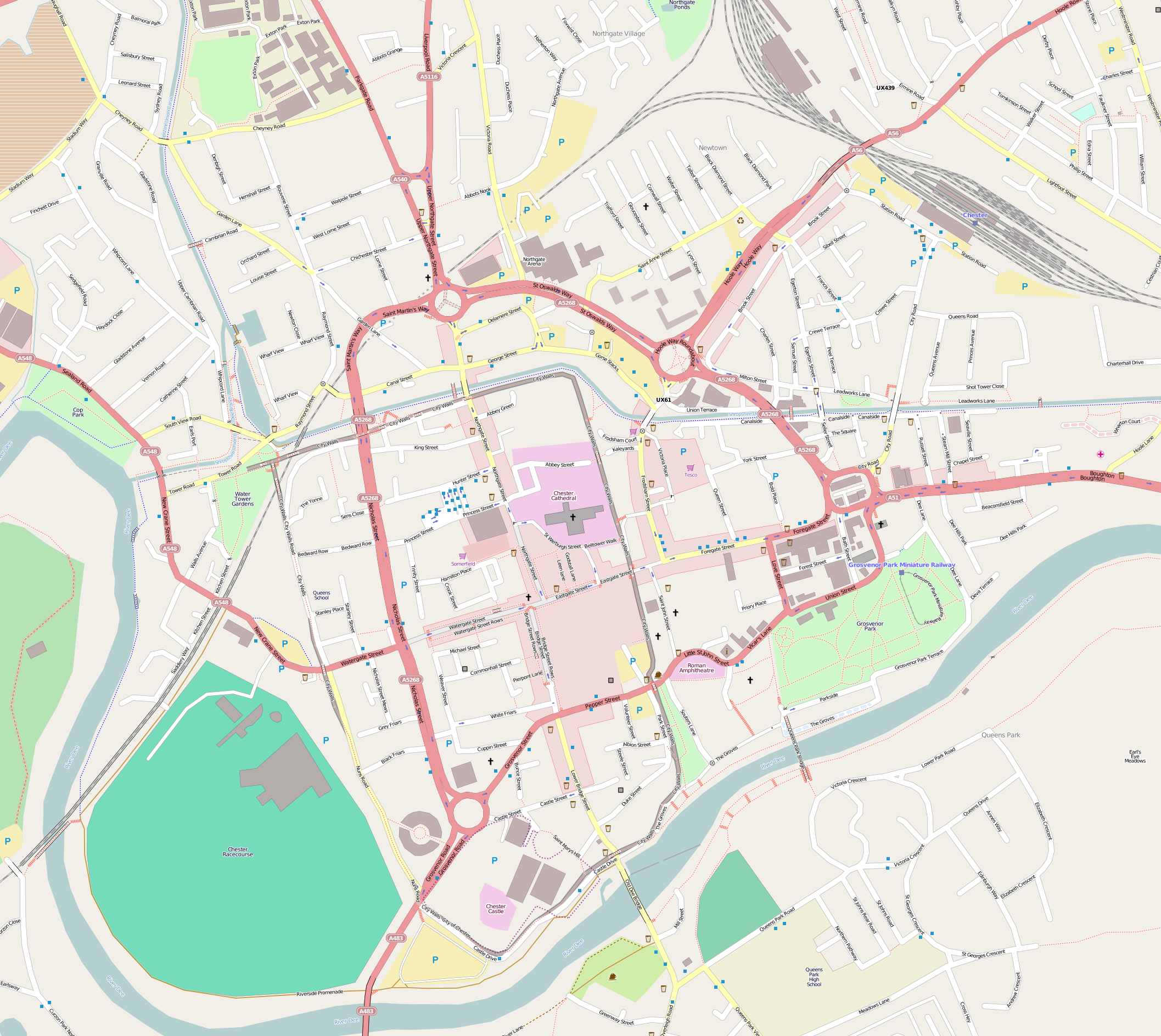
Locations of monastic houses in Chester

The following is a list of the monastic houses in Cheshire, England.

Alien houses are included, as are smaller establishments such as cells and notable monastic granges (particularly those with resident monks), and also camerae of the military orders of monks (Knights Templar and Knights Hospitaller). Monastic hospitals are included where they had the status or function of an abbey, priory, or preceptor/commandery.

Abbreviations and key

Status of remains
Symbol	Status
None	Ruins
*	Current monastic function
^{+}	Current non-monastic ecclesiastic function (including remains incorporated into later structure)
^	Current non-ecclesiastic function (including remains incorporated into later structure) or redundant intact structure
^{$}	Remains limited to earthworks etc.
^{#}	No identifiable trace of the monastic foundation remains
^{~}	Exact site of monastic foundation unknown
^{≈}	Identification ambiguous or confused

Locations with names in italics indicate possible duplication (misidentification with another location) or non-existent foundations (either erroneous reference or proposed foundation never implemented) or ecclesiastical establishments with a monastic name but lacking actual monastic connection.

Trusteeship
EH	English Heritage
LT	Landmark Trust
NT	National Trust

Foundation	Image	Communities & provenance	Formal name or dedication & alternative names	References & location
Barrow Camera (?)		Knights Hospitaller church granted by Robert de Bachepuz (Note: Barrow, Cheshire founder: citing Dugdale, Monasticon Anglicanum vi, p.835 and T. Tanner, Notitia Monastica, also Ormerod, ii, p.186 and Victoria County History: A History of the County of Derby, Volume 2, p.75, n.3); considered to be a confusion with Barrow Camera in Derbyshire (Note: Barrow, Cheshire disputed - L. B. Larking, The Knights Hospitallers in England p.233)	Great Barrow Camera	
Birkenhead Priory	Historical county location. See entry under List of monastic houses in Merseyside			
Bromborough Priory	Historical county location. See entry under List of monastic houses in Merseyside			
Chester Abbey ^{+}		tradition of very early foundation disputed (Note: Chester Abbey T. Tanner, Notitia Monastica, p.57, considers the accounts of Chester Cathedral's foundation either in the time of King Lucius or the foundation of a nunnery by King Wulfhere for his daughter Werburg to be later fictions) ?nuns founded before 875; destroyed? in raids by the Danes 875; secular canons founded after 907, traditionally by Æthelflæd, daughter of King Alfred (Note: Chester Abbey: Christopher N. L. Brooke's communications consider this tradition is correct); Benedictine monks refounded as an abbey 1092/3 by Hugh I, Earl of Chester; dissolved 1540; granted 1534/5; episcopal diocesan cathedral founded 1541; extant	The Abbey Church of Saint Peter and Saint Paul, Chester (-875) The Abbey Church of Saint Werburgh, Chester The Cathedral Church of Christ and the Blessed Virgin Mary, Chester (1541)	53°11′31″N 2°53′25″W
Chester Abbey		secular canons? founded 689; destroyed? in raids by the Danes after 875; secular canons with associated anchorite cell; (?re)founded c.906-7?; part of the college of St John the Baptist; dissolved 1547; briefly episcopal diocesan cathedral, then co-cathedral with Coventry ?1072/5 until 1102; in parochial use from 1102	The Abbey Church of Saint John the Baptist, Chester The Cathedral Church of Saint John the Baptist, Chester (1072/5-1102)	53°11′20″N 2°53′08″W
Chester Blackfriars		Dominican Friars (under the Visitation of Oxford) founded before 1236 by Alexander Stavensby, Bishop of Coventry and Lichfield; dissolved 1538; granted to John Coke of London February 1544; site came into the possession of the Dutton family 1561		53°11′17″N 2°53′43″W
Chester Franciscan Friary, earlier site		Capuchin Franciscan Friars — from Pantasaph, Wales founded 21 December 1858 transferred to new site 1862 (see immediately below)		
Chester Franciscan Friary *		Capuchin Franciscan Friars — from Pantasaph, Wales founded 21 December 1858 at earlier site (see immediately above) transferred to new site 1862; church opened 29 April 1875; extant	St Francis	53°11′16″N 2°53′35″W
Chester Greyfriars		Franciscan Friars Minor, Conventual (under the Custody of Worcester) founded 1237/8 (1238–40) by Albert of Pisa; dissolved 1537 (15 August 1538); granted to John Coke		53°11′25″N 2°53′48″W
Chester Friars of the Sack		Friars of the Sack founded before 1274; dissolved 1284; community probably died out before 1300		53°11′16″N 2°53′58″W
Chester — St Michael's Monastery		uncertain order founded before 1162 (Note: St Michael's Monastery, Chester: T. Tanner, Notitia Monastica p.62, cites Charter of Roger, Constable of Chester and that of Henry II to the Canons of Norton, and states in note i that Sir Peter Leycester, Historical Antiquities p.198, considers this to have been the parish church of St Michael); Parish Church of St Michael, built 15th century; rebuilt by James Harrison 1849–50, currently in use as a Heritage Centre	St Michael	53°11′19″N 2°53′27″W
Chester Whitefriars		Carmelite Friars founded 1279 (or before 1277) by Thomas Stadham; precinct granted 1289 to build their house; dissolved 15 August 1538; granted to John Coke (Cokkes)		53°11′18″N 2°53′39″W
Chester Priory, earlier site		Benedictine? nuns founded before 1066; dissolved before c.1140; refounded on new site (see immediately below)	St Mary	
Chester Priory ^{#}		Benedictine nuns (community founded at earlier site (see immediately above) before 1066); transferred here refounded c.1140 by Ranulph de Gernon (Randal), Earl of Chester; dissolved 1537 (c.1540(?)); granted to Urian Brereton and son; site excavated prior to construction of County Police Headquarters on site 1964	The Priory Church of Saint Mary, Chester	53°11′46″N 2°53′38″W
Combermere Abbey		Savignac monks — from Savigny founded 3 November 1133 by Hugh de Malbane, Lord of Nantwich; Cistercian monks orders merged 17 September 1147; dissolved 1538; granted to William Cotton, Esq.	The Abbey Church of Saint Mary and Saint Michael, Combermere	52°59′38″N 2°36′46″W
Curzon Park Abbey *, Chester		Benedictine nuns (community founded at Talacre, Wales, 1868); transferred from Talacre 1988; extant	The Abbey Church of Our Lady Help of Christians, Curzon Park, Chester	52°59′38″N 2°36′46″W
Darnhall Abbey		Cistercian monks — from Abbey Dore, Herefordshire founded 14 January 1271 to February 1274 by Edward I; transferred to new site at Vale Royal 1281	The Abbey Church of Saint Mary, Darnhall	53°09′57″N 2°32′54″W
Hilbre Island	Historical county location. See entry under List of monastic houses in Merseyside			
Mobberley Priory ^{#}		Augustinian Canons Regular founded c.1203-4 (c.1206) by Patrick of Mobberley; annexed as a cell dependent on Rocester, Staffordshire 1228–40; manor house built on site 1625 (replacing earlier, ruinous house)	The Priory Church of Saint Mary and Saint Wilfrid, Mobberley ____________________; Modberley Priory	53°19′06″N 2°19′00″W
Norton Priory		Augustinian Canons Regular (community founded at Runcorn c.1115); transferred from Runcorn 1134 by William FitzWilliam third Baron of Halton; raised to abbey status 1391 (1422) (early in the reign of Henry VI or sooner); dissolved 1536; granted to Richard Brooke; part converted into private mansion 1545; demolished 1928; now in ownership of Norton Priory Museum Trust open to public as a museum	The Priory Church of Saint Mary at Norton ____________________; Norton Abbey	Greene, pp. 2–3, 65–72. Starkey, pp. 9, 35–40. 53°20′33″N 2°40′46″W
Poulton Abbey		Savignac monks — from Combermere site granted to Combermere 1146; Cistercian monks orders merged 17 September 1147; founded 1153 (Note: Poulton Abbey foundation: Robert died 1153 — date given by W. Dugdale, Monasticon Anglicanum; M. J. C. Fisher, referring to the Chronicle of Dieulacres, Grays Inn, manuscript no.9, f, 138 v. possibly indicates when building started) by Robert, butler to Ranulf II, Earl of Chester; building possibly completed 12 May 1158; transferred to new site at Dieulacres, Staffordshire 1214 due to incursions by the Welsh; subsequently re-used as a monastic grange with chapel; dissolved; granted to William Cotton, Esq. (Sir George Cotton) c.1544; ruinous before 1672; demolished before 1718	St Mary and St Benedict ____________________; Pulton Priory; Pulton Abbey	53°07′09″N 2°53′33″W
Runcorn Priory		supposed monastic house (Note: Runcorn, foundation by Æthelflaed doubted by T. Tanner, Notitia Monastica p.59, note n.) founded c.912 by Æthelflaed of Mercia; Augustinian Canons Regular founded 1115 by William FitzNigel second Baron of Halton; transferred to new site at Norton 1134; possibly on site now occupied by All Saints parish church	St Mary and St Bertelin	Greene, p. 1. Starkey, p. 9. 53°20′37″N 2°44′12″W
Saighton Grange		Benedictine monks mainly agricultural grange converted to residential grange of the abbots of Chester 15th century; monastic site, apart from gatehouse, demolished 1861; house built on site; converted into a school named 'Abbey Gate College' 1977		53°09′02″N 2°50′03″W
Stanlow Abbey		Cistercian monks — from Combermere; founded 11 November 1172 by John FitzRichard, Constable and sixth Baron of Halton; transferred to new site at Whalley, Lancashire 1296; retained in use as a cell/grange dependent on Whalley from c.1350(?) until 1442; dissolved 1442?; granted to Sir Robert Cotton, Kt. c.1553; no substantial remains, site inaccessible	The Blessed Virgin Mary ____________________; Locus Benedictus de Stanlawe; Stanlaw Abbey; Stanlawe Abbey	53°17′24″N 2°51′36″W
Stanney Grange		Cistercian monks grange with resident monk, dependent on Stanlow and Whalley, Lancashire; founded 1172	Cow Worth Grange	53°16′20″N 2°53′04″W
Vale Royal Abbey		Cistercian monks (community founded at Darnhall 14 January 1274 to 1277); transferred from Darnhall 1281; never completed; a project of Edward I; dissolved 1545; granted to Thomas Holcroft c.1543	Saint Mary the Virgin, Saint Nicholas and Saint Nicasius ____________________; Valeroyal Abbey	53°13′29″N 2°32′33″W
Warrington Austin Friars		Augustinian Friars (under the Limit of Lincoln) founded before 1272? (built 1379?) on the site of an earlier hospital; dissolved 1539; granted to Thomas Holcroft 1540/1; church continued in use until 17th century		53°23′13″N 2°35′37″W
Warburton Priory	Historical county location. See entry under List of monastic houses in Greater Manchester			

== See also ==
- List of monastic houses in England
- List of monastic houses in Wales
