= List of monastic houses in Leicestershire =

Monasteries in Leicestershire
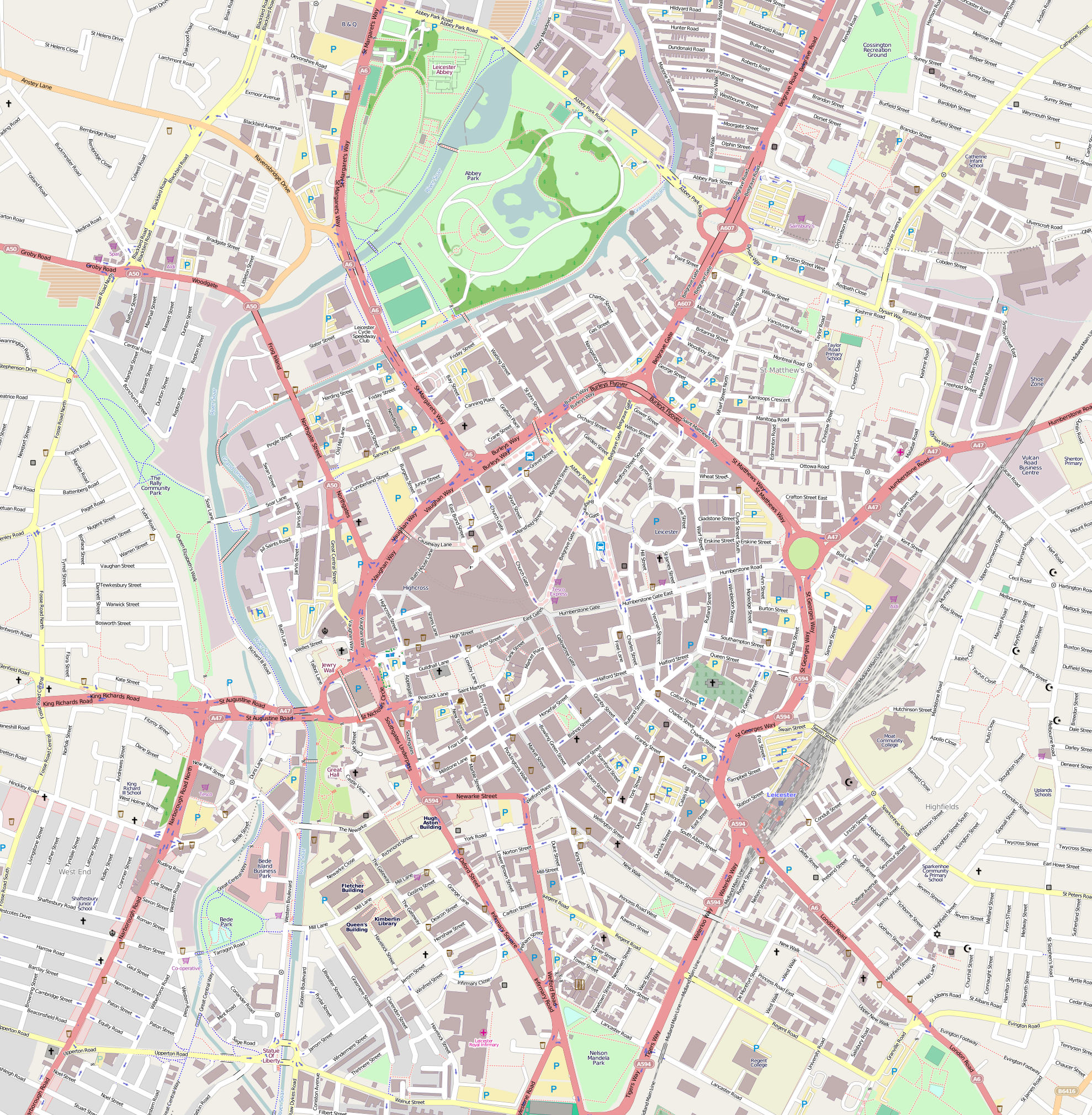
Monasteries in Leicester

The following is a list of the monastic houses in Leicestershire, England.

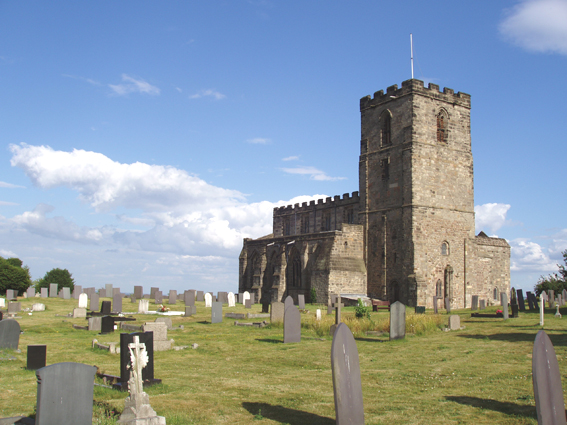
Breedon Priory, built on the site of Holy Hill Monastery: the oldest Monastic site in Leicestershire. Founded 675AD

Alien houses are included, as are smaller establishments such as cells and notable monastic granges (particularly those with resident monks), and also camerae of the military orders of monks (Knights Templar and Knights Hospitaller). Monastic hospitals are included where they had the status or function of an abbey, priory, or preceptor/commandery.

Abbreviations and key

Status of remains
Symbol	Status
None	Ruins
*	Current monastic function
^{+}	Current non-monastic ecclesiastic function (including remains incorporated into later structure)
^	Current non-ecclesiastic function (including remains incorporated into later structure) or redundant intact structure
^{$}	Remains limited to earthworks etc.
^{#}	No identifiable trace of the monastic foundation remains
^{~}	Exact site of monastic foundation unknown
^{≈}	Identification ambiguous or confused

Locations with names in italics indicate possible duplication (misidentification with another location) or non-existent foundations (either erroneous reference or proposed foundation never implemented) or ecclesiastical establishments with a monastic name but lacking actual monastic connection.

Trusteeship
EH	English Heritage
LT	Landmark Trust
NT	National Trust

Foundation	Image	Communities & provenance	Formal name or dedication & alternative names	References & location
Aldermanshaw Priory ^		Cluniac monks founded before/c.1220-35; alien house: cell dependent on Bermondsey, Surrey (London); dissolved/ruinous before 1450; 17th century cottage built on site	Aldermans Haw	52°43′34″N 1°15′29″W
Belvoir Priory		Benedictine monks priory cell, dependent on St Albans, Hertfordshire; founded 1076-88 begun by Robert de Todeni, lord of Belvoir 1076; completed by Abbot Paul of St Albans; dissolved 1539		52°53′55″N 0°46′54″W
Bradley Priory		Augustinian Canons Regular founded after 1220 by Robert Bundy; dissolved 1536; granted to Thomas Newell, Esq. 1537/8	Braddley Priory	52°33′01″N 0°47′14″W
Holy Hill monastery, Breedon ^{#}		Saxon Benedictine? monks — from Medeshamstede (Peterborough), (Cambridgeshire) founded late-7th century; abandoned 874 during Danish raids; Augustinian Priory built on site (see immediately below)		52°48′22″N 1°23′59″W
Breedon Priory ^{+}		Augustinian Canons Regular priory cell, dependent on Nostell, Yorkshire; refounded between 1109 and 1122, on site of earlier Saxon monastery (see immediately above): church of SS Mary and Hardulph granted to Nostel by Robert de Ferrers; dissolved November 1539; granted to John, Lord Grey 1553	Bredon Priory	52°48′22″N 1°24′00″W
Buckminster ^{~}		possible Saxon minster		
Charley Priory ^{$}		dependent on Luffield, Buckinghamshire; confirmed to Luffield by the Pope 1173–4; founded before 1190, granted to Evroul by Countess Parnel of Leicester (Blanchmain's, Earl of Leicester (Note: Charley Priory — sic. Cobbett)); confirmed to Ware, chief dependency of St Evroul in England 1203–6; described as hermitage c.1220; Augustinian Canons Regular alien house: grange dependent on St Evroul; founded after 1220; ruinous 1455; dissolved 1465; granted to Frideswide, widow; united with Ulverscroft c.1465	Chorley and Ulverscroft Priory; Locum de S. Mariae de Charleia	52°43′41″N 1°17′29″W
Croxton Abbey		Premonstratensian Canons — from Newhouse, Lincolnshire; founded before 1160 (1163, 1162) by William Porcarius; dissolved 1538 (1539); granted to Thomas, Earl of Rutland 1538/9	Croxton Kerrial Abbey	52°50′23″N 0°46′47″W
Dalby and Heather Preceptory ^{#}		Knights Hospitallers founded before 1206, granted purportedly by Robert Bossu, Earl of Leicester (Note: Dalby — Cobbett states hospital of Knights Templar); dissolved 1538 (1540); granted to Sir Andrew Nowell	Old Dalby Preceptory; Dalby Preceptory	52°48′12″N 0°59′57″W
Garendon Abbey		Cistercian monks probable daughter house of Waverley, Surrey; founded 28 October 1133 by Roboert Bossu, Earl of Leicester; dissolved 1536; granted to Thomas, Earl of Rutland 1540/1; house named 'Garendon Hall' built on site, demolished 1964	Gerondon Abbey	52°46′27″N 1°15′31″W
Grace Dieu Priory ^		Augustinian Canonesses founded c.1239/40 by Rose (Rorsia) de Verdon; 'White Nuns of St Augustine' dissolved 1538; granted to Humphrey Foster 1538/9; remains incorporated into a cottage; largely demolished 1696; in care of Grace Dieu Priory Trust; open to public from late 2004	The Priory Church of Holy Trinity and St Mary, Belton ____________________; Gracedieu Priory; Belton Priory	52°45′40″N 1°21′23″W
Heather Preceptory		Knights Hospitallers founded before 1199 (during the reign of King John); reduced to camera before 1338; dissolution unknown — administered from Dalby (itself dissolved 1540)	Hether Hospital	52°41′36″N 1°25′29″W
Hinckley Priory		Benedictine monks alien house: priory cell dependent on Lyre; founded before 1173(?): church and land granted to Lyre by Robert [Blanchmaines], Earl of Leicester (confirmed by Henry II); dissolved 1409; granted to the Dean and Chapter of Westminster; site later occupied by a mansion then smaller private houses	Hinkley Priory	52°32′25″N 1°22′18″W
Hinckley Dominican Priory		Dominican monks		
Kirby Bellars Priory +		Secular college or chantry founded 1316 by Roger de Bellars; Augustinian Canons Regular took on St Augustine's Rule in 1359; domestic buildings rebuilt before the reformation after a fire c. 1511; dissolved 1536: granted to Charles Blount, Lord Mountjoy 1543/4; earthworks work mark the remains of the site in the field north of the current parish church	Kirkby Bellers Priory; Kirkby Bellairs Priory; Kerkbey on the Wrethek Priory	52°45′30″N 0°56′17″W
Langley Priory ^		Benedictine nuns — from Farewell, Staffordshire founded c.1150(?) by William Pantulf (Pontulf) and his wife burgia; Cistercian nuns? (claimed during time of Pope Alexander III, claim apparently abandoned 13th century); dissolved 1536 (before1537); granted to Thomas Grey 1543/4; incorporated into a 16th/17th century house; present house incorporates medieval fabric	The Priory Church of God and the Blessed Virgin	52°48′28″N 1°21′30″W
Launde Priory ^{#}	The Chapel at Launde Abbey, part of the original priory buildings	Augustinian Canons Regular founded 1119-25 by Richard Basset and his wife Maud; dissolved 1539; granted to Thomas, Lord Cromwell 1539/40; site occupied by manor house named 'Launde Abbey' now a retreat/conference centre	St John the Baptist ____________________; Landa Priory	52°37′51″N 0°49′25″W
Leicester Abbey		Augustinian Canons Regular founded 1143 (1139?) by Robert Bossu, Earl of Leicester; dissolved 1538; granted to William, Marquis of Northampton 1550/1	The Abbey Church of the Assumption of the Blessed Virgin Mary, Leicester ____________________; St Mary de Pre; St Mary de Pratis (St Mary of the Meadows)	52°38′52″N 1°08′18″W
Leicester Austin Friary		Augustinian hermits founded 1254; dissolved November 1538; granted to John Bellew and John Broxholm	St Catherine	52°38′00″N 1°08′40″W
Leicester Blackfriars ^{#}		Dominican Friars (under the Visitation of Oxford) founded before 1284; dissolved 1538; granted to Henry, Marquis of Dorset 1546/7	St Clement	52°38′13″N 1°08′40″W
Leicester Friars of the Sack ^{~}		Friars of the Sack founded before 1274; apparently abandoned by 1295		52°37′50″N 1°08′40″W (actual site unknown)
Leicester Greyfriars		Franciscan Friars Minor, Conventual (under the Custody of Oxford) founded before 1230 (1265) by Simon de Montfort, Earl of Leicester; Burial place of King Richard III after his defeat at the Battle of Bosworth 1485 (confirmed by the recovery of his body 2013); dissolved 1538; granted to John Bellew and John Broxholm 1545/6		52°38′00″N 1°08′13″W
Leicester — Holy Cross Priory *		Dominican Friars founded 1882; church consecrated 14 May 1958; extant	The Priory of the Holy Cross, Leicester	52°37′50″N 1°07′49″W
Minsterton Monastery		possible Saxon minster		
Mount St Bernard Abbey, earlier site ^{#}		Cistercian monks (Cistercian order of the Strict Observance/Trappists) founded 1835; became a guest house when new monastery (see immediately below) opened 1844; reformatory 1856; closed 1885, demolished		52°44′08″N 1°19′23″W
Mount St Bernard Abbey *		Cistercian monks (Cistercian order of the Strict Observance / Trappists) founded 1844; replaced earlier monastery (see immediately above); extant		52°44′29″N 1°19′23″W
Owston Abbey ^{+}		Augustinian Canons Regular — Arroaisan founded before 1161 by Sir Robert Grimbald, confirmed by Theobald, Archbishop of Canterbury; Augustinian Canons Regular independent from before 1260–80; dissolved 1536; granted to Sir John Harrington 1538/9; site now in private ownership as Manor Farm; church restored and now in parochial use	The Abbey Church of Saint Andrew, Owston ____________________; Osulveston Priory	52°39′50″N 0°51′23″W
Rothley Temple		Knights Templar founded 1231: manor granted by Henry III; chapel built c.1240; Knights Hospitaller transferred 1312 (1313); dissolved before 1489 (1540); transferred to the Crown; granted to Babington family; manor house built on site	Rothley Preceptory	52°42′19″N 1°08′56″W
Swinford Preceptory		Knights Hospitaller founded before 1199: (granted before the reign of King John); under Dalby before 1220; separate camera under a seneschal 1338; dissolved 1538		52°24′22″N 1°10′42″W
Ulverscroft Priory		Augustinian Eremites founded 1134: land granted by Ranulph de Gernon, Earl of Chester; Augustinian Canons Regular founded before c.1174(?) by Robert, Earl of Leicester; still referred to as a hermitage c.1220; suppression avoided 1536; dissolved 15 September 1539; now in private ownership without public access	St Mary	52°42′36″N 1°15′35″W
Ulverscroft Monastery		uncertain order and foundation		

== See also ==
- List of monastic houses in England
