= Warburton Priory =

Former priory in Manchester, England

Approximate location of Warburton Priory, Manchester.

Warburton Priory was populated by Premonstratensian Canons and classed as a cell daughter of Cockersand, Lancashire. The priory was founded c. 1200 by the church of St Mary and St Werburgh and subsequently granted to Cockersand by Adam of Dutton, it was abandoned sometime before 1271.

== See also ==
- List of monastic houses in Greater Manchester
- List of monastic houses in England
