= Soft capping =

Architectural conservation technique

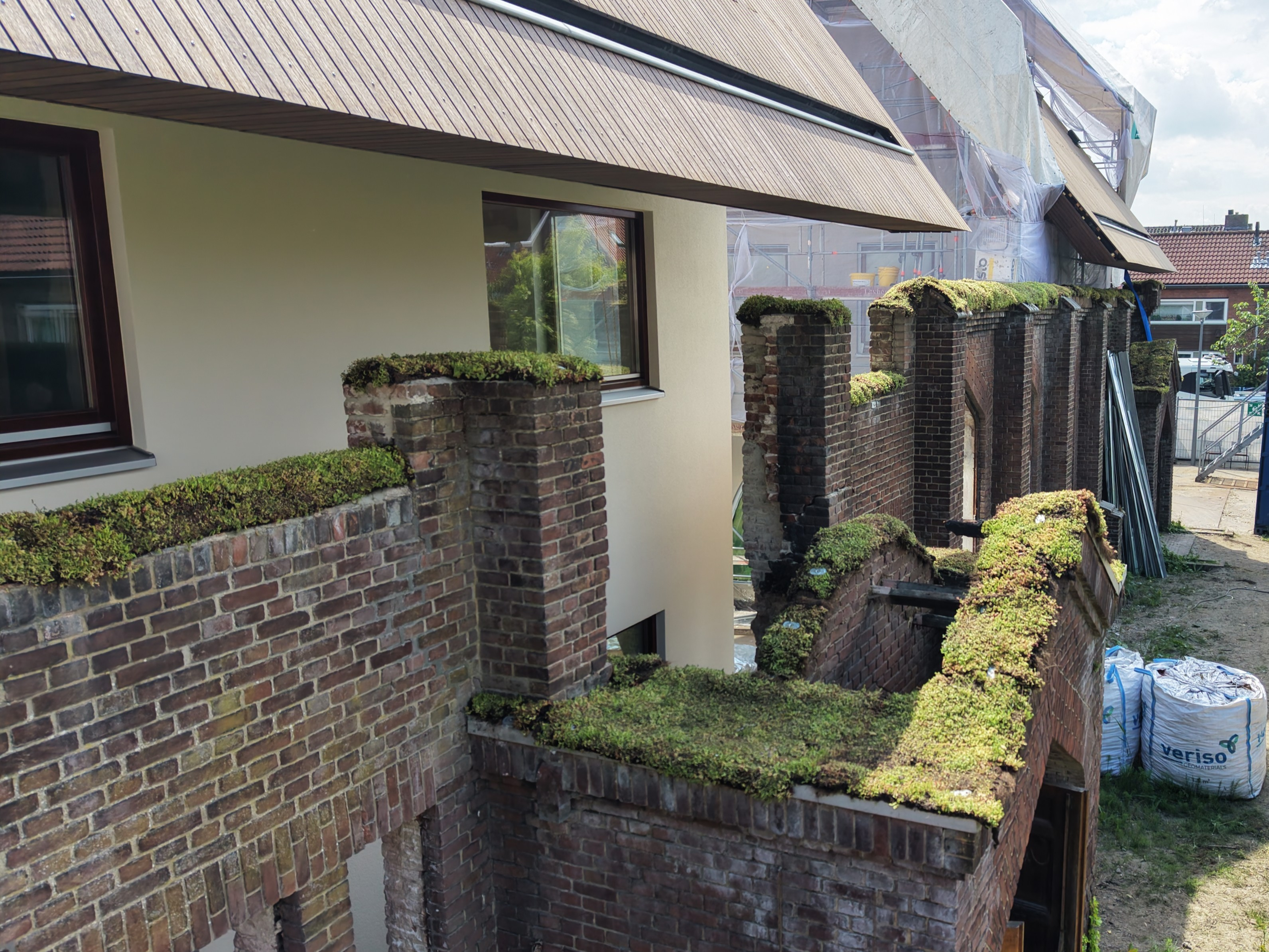
Soft capping at the Julianakerk in Rotterdam

Soft capping (/ˈsɒft ˌkæpɪŋ/) is the topping of historic walls and roof edges, usually ruins, with soil, microorganisms, composite organisms and vegetation to reduce frost and water damage. The concept itself is a relatively new conservation method, although the technique has been applied for thousands of years, such as in sod houses.

Soft capping emerged as an alternative to hard capping methods, such as concrete or stone coping, which were often visually intrusive and prone to cracking over time. The approach generally emphasizes minimal intervention, breathability of historic masonry and compatibility with traditional materials. The method has been studied and promoted in conservation projects involving historic ruins, abbeys, castles, and ecclesiastical sites throughout Europe, with notable sites such as Reading Abbey, Melrose Abbey, De Lunetten, The Old Bishop's Palace and Saint Bavo's Abbey. Furthermore, soft capping systems are now sometimes incorporated as an architectural element in new projects, such as the Julianakerk in Rotterdam.

== Types ==
In scientific literature about the method, four distinct types of softcapping are described, based on the type of vegetation used.

=== Phototrophic biofilms- and lichen-capping ===
Phototrophic biofilms- and lichen-capping are forms of soft capping that utilize naturally occurring biological growths, such as lichens, cyanobacteria, algae, and other phototrophic microorganisms, to create a protective layer on exposed masonry and earthen structures. These biological layers can regulate moisture exchange, reduce direct rainfall impact, and moderate temperature fluctuations on vulnerable surfaces.

Although biological colonization has traditionally been associated with biodeterioration, recent conservation studies have suggested that certain stable biofilms and lichen communities may also provide protective effects by shielding stone surfaces from erosion and environmental stress. The effectiveness of these biological caps depends on factors such as climate, stone composition, moisture availability, and the species involved.

=== Bryophyte-capping ===
Bryophyte-capping is a form of soft capping that utilizes bryophytes, including mosses and liverworts, as protective vegetative layers on exposed masonry and earthen heritage structures. Bryophytes are particularly suited to humid and temperate environments due to their ability to retain moisture, colonize mineral surfaces, and grow in shallow substrates with limited nutrient availability.

In heritage conservation, bryophyte-capping has been studied for its ability to regulate surface microclimates by reducing rapid moisture fluctuations, limiting direct rainfall impact, and moderating temperature changes on exposed wall heads and slopes. Moss layers can also reduce surface runoff and erosion by slowing water movement across vulnerable surfaces.

=== Spermatophyte-capping ===
Spermatophyte-capping is a type of soft capping that employs seed plants, including grasses, herbaceous vegetation, and succulent species such as sedum, to protect exposed masonry and earthen structures. In contrast to microbial or bryophytic capping systems, spermatophyte-capping generally relies on plants with developed root systems and greater structural biomass, allowing for broader coverage and increased resistance to erosion caused by rainfall and wind.

This form of soft capping is commonly applied to wall heads, parapets, and archaeological remains where sufficient substrate depth is available to support rooted vegetation. The plant layer functions as a protective buffer by intercepting precipitation, reducing solar exposure, stabilizing loose material, and moderating thermal fluctuations on exposed surfaces. Species selection is typically based on climatic conditions, maintenance requirements, root behavior, and compatibility with the underlying historic material.

In modern conservation practice, drought-tolerant species such as sedum are frequently favored because of their shallow rooting characteristics and limited maintenance requirements. However, inappropriate plant selection or unmanaged root development may contribute to structural instability, moisture retention, or biological deterioration in vulnerable masonry.

=== Mixed plants-capping ===
Mixed plants-capping is a form of soft capping that combines multiple vegetation types, including lichens, bryophytes, grasses, herbaceous plants and succulent species, to create a multilayered protective covering on exposed masonry and earthen heritage structures. The approach aims to combine the ecological and protective advantages of different plant communities in order to improve long-term stability, moisture regulation, and environmental adaptability.

In mixed systems, different plant species occupy complementary ecological roles. Lower-growing organisms such as mosses and lichens can stabilize surface particles and reduce direct weathering, while rooted vascular plants contribute to erosion control and increased substrate cohesion. The vegetation layer may also improve microclimatic buffering by limiting rapid wetting and drying cycles, reducing thermal stress, and slowing surface runoff during heavy rainfall events.

Mixed plants-capping is often regarded as one of the more adaptable forms of soft capping because plant composition can be adjusted according to climate, substrate conditions, exposure, and conservation objectives. In some conservation projects, naturally developed mixed vegetation communities are retained or managed rather than removed, particularly where they are considered to contribute to environmental buffering and visual integration within historic landscapes.

== Appliance ==
Several distinct approaches to vegetative soft capping have been developed within architectural conservation practice, particularly in relation to the treatment of exposed masonry and ruined wall heads. Although individual applications may vary depending on climate, substrate composition, wall geometry and vegetation type, two principal vegetative soft capping methods are commonly distinguished in conservation practice: the English method and the Scottish method. Both approaches aim to reduce water ingress, thermal stress, and erosion while maintaining compatibility with historic masonry materials and the surrounding landscape.

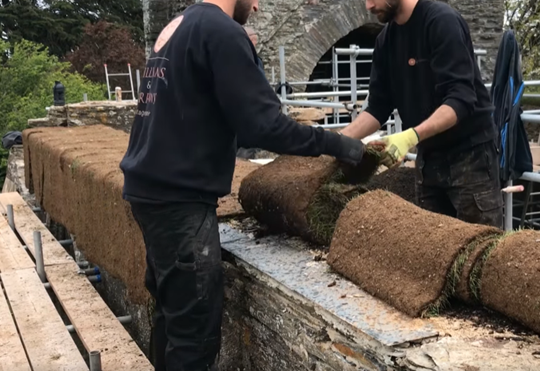
The English method applied at St Andrew's Church, South Huish in Devon.

=== English method ===
The English method of soft capping typically consists of applying a layer of compacted clay or lime-based material to the wall head, covered with soil and low-growing vegetation, usually grass. The vegetation mat is folded into itself, sometimes even using double mats. The double layer of vegetation acts as a natural weathering layer, helping to regulate moisture and reduce erosion caused by direct rainfall and temperature fluctuations. The English method is generally associated with principles of minimal intervention and reversibility, allowing the soft cap to remain visually integrated with ruined and archaeological structures while limiting the use of visually intrusive hard capping materials.

=== Scottish method ===
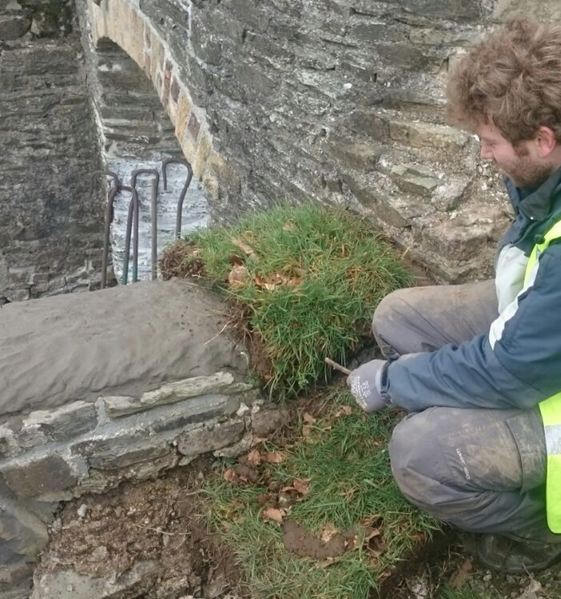
The Scottish method applied at Russborough House in Wicklow.

The Scottish method of soft capping differs from the English approach by placing a mortar layer over the masonry before applying the soft capping. This technique often involves more moisture-retaining vegetation, such as sedum, that is suited to harsher climatic conditions. The vegetation is also often attached directly to the mortar using anchor bolts, making it more suitable for higher walls and roofs where there is more exposure to strong winds. Compared to the English method, the Scottish approach generally places greater emphasis on structural fixation and moisture retention in order to withstand more severe climatic conditions, particularly in coastal and upland environments.

== Aesthetics ==
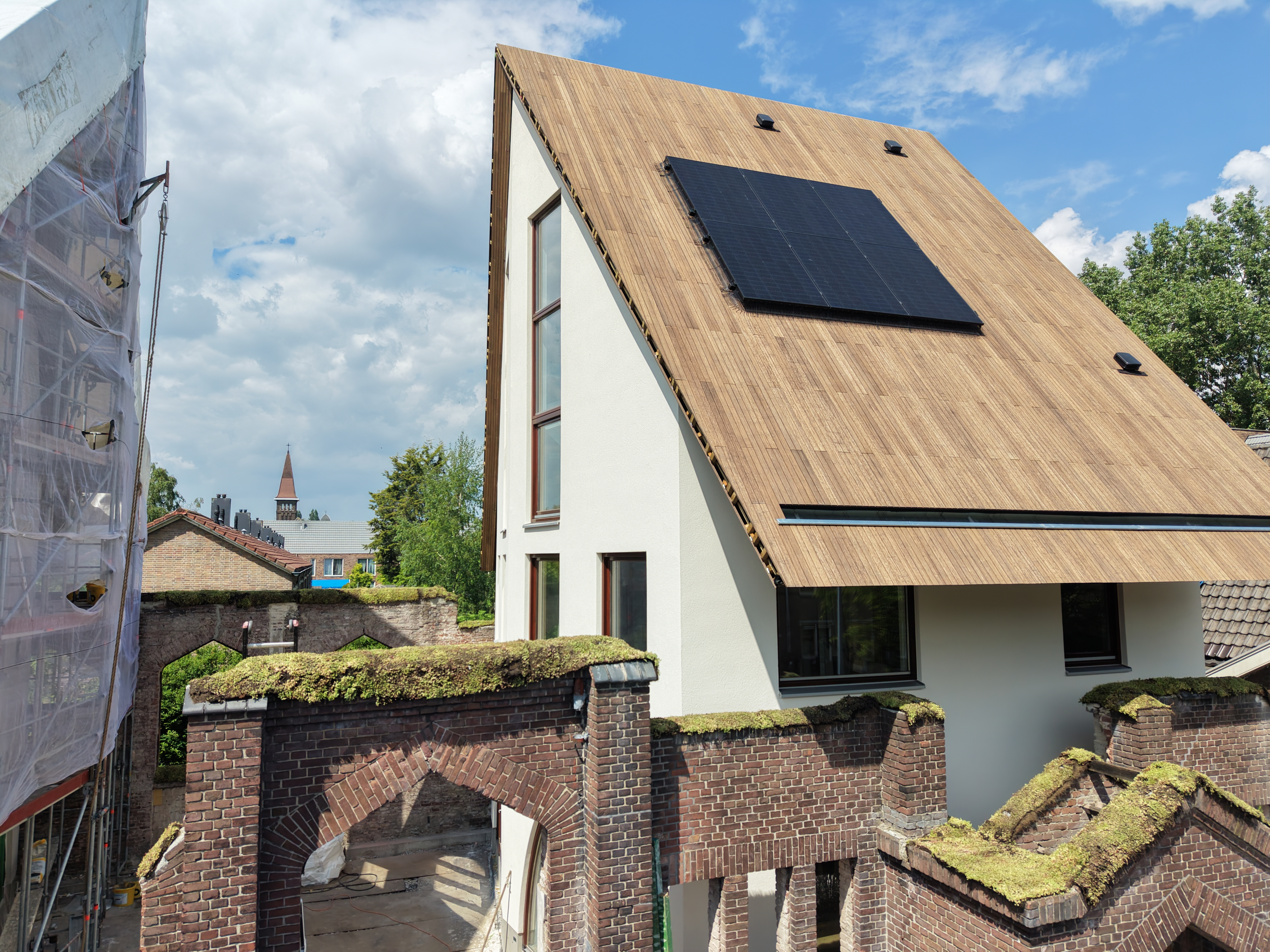
Soft capping used in combination with modern architecture at the Julianakerk in Rotterdam.

In contemporary architecture, soft capping has increasingly been explored not only as a conservation method, but also as an aesthetic and ecological design feature. Modern applications use vegetation-covered wall heads, parapets, roof edges, and retaining structures to integrate buildings more closely with surrounding landscapes, similar to green roofs.

In contrast to traditional hard capping materials such as concrete, metal, or stone coping, soft capping introduces living vegetation that changes seasonally and contributes to a greener urban appearance.

Architects and landscape designers have incorporated soft capping into modern residential, commercial, and public projects as part of broader sustainable and biophilic design strategies. The technique can be combined with green roofs, green walls, and biodiversity-focused planting schemes to improve visual quality, support pollinators, reduce heat absorption, and enhance rainwater retention.

Modern soft capping systems may incorporate engineered drainage layers, lightweight substrates and irrigation systems, allowing the technique to be adapted for both historic preservation and contemporary architecture.

== See also ==
- Ruins
- Modern ruins
- Historic preservation
- Contemporary architecture
- Green roofs
- List of abbeys and priories in the United Kingdom
- Romanticism
- Slighting
