= List of monastic houses in Lancashire =

The following is a list of the monastic houses in Lancashire, England.

Locations of monastic houses in Lancashire
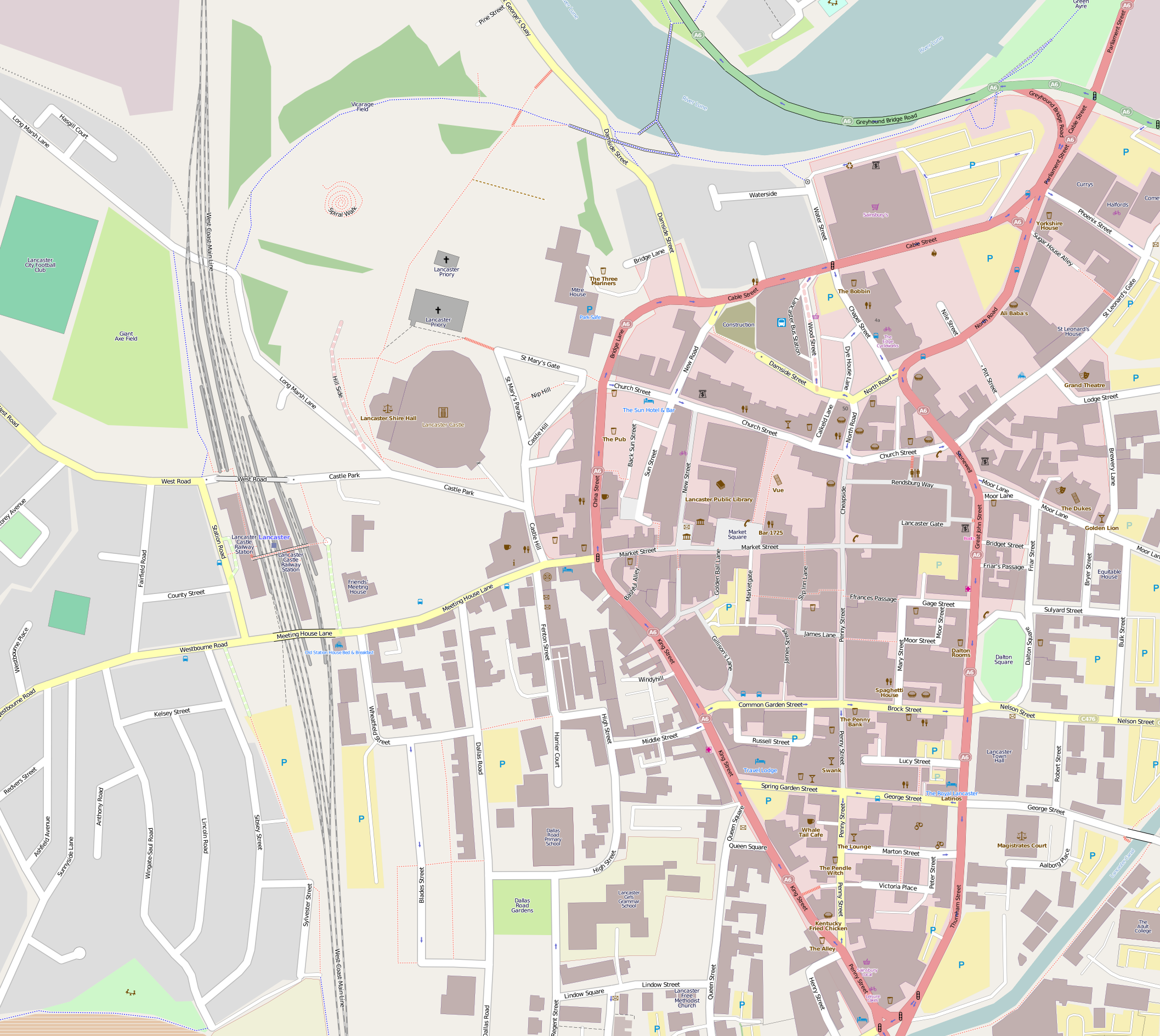
Locations of monastic houses in Lancaster

Alien houses are included, as are smaller establishments such as cells and notable monastic granges (particularly those with resident monks), and also camerae of the military orders of monks (Knights Templar and Knights Hospitaller). Monastic hospitals are included where they had the status or function of an abbey, priory, or preceptor/commandery.

Abbreviations and key

Status of remains
Symbol	Status
None	Ruins
*	Current monastic function
^{+}	Current non-monastic ecclesiastic function (including remains incorporated into later structure)
^	Current non-ecclesiastic function (including remains incorporated into later structure) or redundant intact structure
^{$}	Remains limited to earthworks etc.
^{#}	No identifiable trace of the monastic foundation remains
^{~}	Exact site of monastic foundation unknown
^{≈}	Identification ambiguous or confused

Locations with names in italics indicate possible duplication (misidentification with another location) or non-existent foundations (either erroneous reference or proposed foundation never implemented) or ecclesiastical establishments with a monastic name but lacking actual monastic connection.

Trusteeship
EH	English Heritage
LT	Landmark Trust
NT	National Trust

Foundation	Image	Communities & provenance	Formal name or dedication & alternative names	References & location
Barnoldswick Abbey		Cistercian monks daughter house of Fountains, Yorkshire; founded 19 May 1147; transferred to Kirkstall, Yorkshire 1152, thereafter retained as a grange; currently located in a field called 'Monk's Royd'	Mount St Mary's Abbey	53°55′00″N 2°11′45″W
Beaumont Grange		Savignac monks dependent on Furness (Cumbria) founded c.1130: granted by Warine; a 'large and important colony'; Cistercian monks orders merged 17 September 1147		54°04′47″N 2°47′13″W
Burscough Priory		Augustinian Canons Regular founded 1186 (c.1190) by Robert Fitz Henry, Lord of Lathom and Knowsley probably for canons from Norton; dissolved 1536	St Nicholas ____________________ probably Blakesmere Priory (Note: Blakesmere — listed in "Chapters of Augustinian Canons" — probably reference to Burscough)	53°34′59″N 2°51′23″W
Cartmel Priory	Historical county location. See entry under List of monastic houses in Cumbria			
Chapel-le-Wood Cell	Historical county location. See entry under List of monastic houses in Cumbria			
Cockerham Priory ^{#}		Augustinian Canons Regular cell of St Mary in the Meadows (de Pratis) at Leicester; founded c.1207 or 1208: granted to Leicester 1153-4 by William de Lancaster; cell 1281–90, secular chaplain appointed — most of the canons withdrawn; dissolved 1477		53°57′36″N 2°49′14″W
Cockersand Abbey		land granted to Leicester 1153-6 by William I of Lancaster; Hospital of St Mary founded before 1184 by Hugh Garth, hermit, with benefactions from William of Lancaster II; Premonstratensian Canons cell dependent on Croxton, Leicestershire; priory refounded after 1184 by William of Lancaster (Lancastre) raised to abbey status 1192, continuing as a hospital; dissolved 29 January 1539; granted to John Kechin (Kitchen) 1543/4; now in private ownership of the Dalton family	St Mary ____________________; Thurnham Abbey	53°58′36″N 2°52′28″W
Conishead Priory	Historical county location. See entry under List of monastic houses in Cumbria			
Furness Abbey	Historical county location. See entry under List of monastic houses in Cumbria			
Hawkshead Grange	Historical county location. See entry under List of monastic houses in Cumbria			
Heysham Monastery(?) ^{#}		suggested early monastic settlement; 14th-15th century church of St Peter built on site, incorporating pre-Conquest remains 800–950		54°02′51″N 2°54′07″W
Hornby Priory ^{#}		possible hospital 1160–1172; Premonstratensian Canons cell daughter house of Croxton, Leicestershire; founded c.1172(?) by a member of the Montbegons of Hornby (the ancestors of Sir Thomas Stanley) probably by Roger de Motgebon III (Note: Horn by Priory — J. Tait, Victoria County History: A History of the County of Lancaster: Volume 2, (1908), p.160); dissolved September 1538; granted to Lord Montegle 1544/5	St Wilfrid ____________________; Horneby Priory	54°06′55″N 2°38′53″W
Kersal Priory	Historical county location. See entry under List of monastic houses in Greater Manchester			
Lancaster Blackfriars		Dominican Friars (under the Visitation of York) founded 1259/60 by Sir Hugh Harrington; dissolved 1539; granted to John Polcroft 1540/1		54°02′53″N 2°47′48″W
Lancaster Greyfriars		Franciscan Friars some evidence of short-lived house (Note: Lancaster Greyfriars — though reference in "Notitia Monastica" is to the Dominican friary), precise site and dates of foundation and dissolution unknown		54°03′04″N 2°48′39″W (approx)
Lancaster Priory		Benedictine monks founded c.1094 by Earl Roger of Poictiers (Roger, Earl of Poitiers); alien house: dependent on Séez; dissolved 1428	St Mary	54°03′03″N 2°48′22″W
Lytham Priory		Benedictine monks cell dependent on Durham; founded 1189-94 (Note: Lytham Priory — foundation according to Victoria County History) (1191-4 (Note: Lytham Priory — foundation according to Dr. Diana Greenway: communications and references from Christopher N. L. Brooke)) by Richard Fitz Rogers; dissolved 1535 (1534); granted to Sir Thomas Holcroft; demolished; 17th century country house built on site	St Mary and St Cuthbert ____________________; Lythom Priory	53°44′39″N 2°58′37″W
Marland Grange	Historical county location. See entry under List of monastic houses in Greater Manchester			
Penwortham Priory		Benedictine monks founded c.1104 (between 1104 and 1122 (Note: Penwortham Priory — founded during the tenure of Abbot Robert at Evesham (1104–1122): Victoria County History: A History of the County of Worcester: Volume 2, p.127 (Chronicle de Evesham) and Florence of Worcester, ii, p.53, and others (communications and references from Christopher N. L. Brooke))) by the bounty of Warine Bussel; dissolved c.1535; granted to John Fleetwood 1542/3		53°45′14″N 2°43′33″W
Preston Greyfriars		Franciscan Friars Minor, Conventual (under the Custody of Worcester) founded 1256(?) c.1260 by Edmond, Earl of Lancaster; dissolved 1539; granted to Thomas Holcroft 1540/1		53°45′35″N 2°42′11″W (approx)
Sawley Abbey		Cistercian monks — from Newminster, Northumberland daughter house of Newminster; founded probably 6 January 1147 by William de Percy, monks probably arrived 1 January 1148; dissolved 1536; EH	Salley Abbey; Sallay Abbey	53°54′48″N 2°20′31″W
Staining Grange		Cistercian monks grange of Stanlow, Cheshire, then of Whalley; founded before 1240		53°49′04″N 2°59′10″W
Tulketh Priory		Sauvignac monks founded 4 July 1124 by Stephen, Count of Boulogne; transferred to Furness (Cumbria) 1127		53°45′56″N 2°46′19″W (approx)
Upholland Priory^{+}		chantry and collegiate chapel founded 1307–10; Benedictine monks/friars? founded 1319 (1318) by Walter Langton, Bishop of Lichfield; dissolved 1536; granted to John Holcroft 1545/6; remains incorporated into the Parish Church of St Thomas the Martyr	Holand Friary	53°32′24″N 2°43′14″W
Warburton Priory	Historical county location. See entry under List of monastic houses in Greater Manchester			
Warrington Austin Friars	Historical county location. See entry under List of monastic houses in Merseyside			
Whalley Abbey		Cistercian monks — from Stanlow, Cheshire daughter house of Combermere, Cheshire; (community founded at Stanlow 11 November 1172); transferred here 1296, founded 4 April 1296; dissolved 10 March 1537; granted to Richard Assheton and John Braddyll 1553/4; now in ownership of the Anglican Diocese of Blackburn and the Catholic Church	The Blessed Virgin Mary ____________________; Locus Benedictus de Whalley Abbey	53°49′14″N 2°24′38″W
Wyresdale Abbey		Cistercian monks — from Furness (Cumbria) and Savigny founded 1193 (c.1196), site possibly granted by Theobald Walter who appropriated a church to the new foundation between 1193 and 1196; transferred to Arklow, Co. Wicklow, Ireland, then to Abingdon, Co. Limerick; traditionally the site is below the meeting of the Marshaw Wyre and the Tarnbrook Wyre, on the north bank of the Abbeystead reservoir		53°58′53″N 2°40′25″W (approx traditional location)

== See also ==
- List of monastic houses in England
