= List of monastic houses in Tyne and Wear =

Monastic houses in Tyne + Wear, northern England

Locations of monastic houses in Tyne and Wear
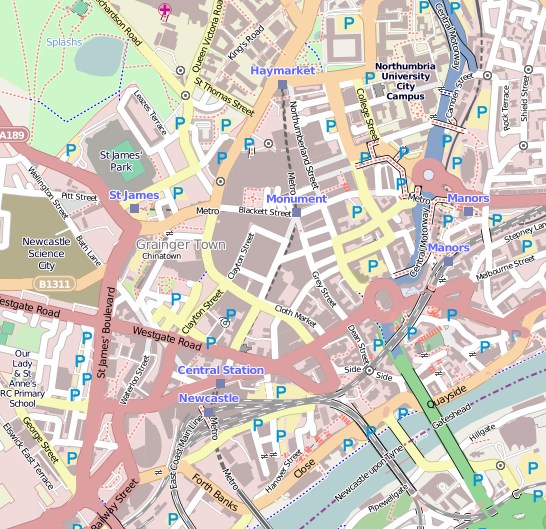
Locations of monastic houses in Newcastle-upon-Tyne

The following is a list of the monastic houses in Tyne and Wear, England.

Alien houses are included, as are smaller establishments such as cells and notable monastic granges (particularly those with resident monks), and also camerae of the military orders of monks (Knights Templar and Knights Hospitaller). Monastic hospitals are included where they had the status or function of an abbey, priory, or preceptor/commandery.

Abbreviations and key

Status of remains
Symbol	Status
None	Ruins
*	Current monastic function
^{+}	Current non-monastic ecclesiastic function (including remains incorporated into later structure)
^	Current non-ecclesiastic function (including remains incorporated into later structure) or redundant intact structure
^{$}	Remains limited to earthworks etc.
^{#}	No identifiable trace of the monastic foundation remains
^{~}	Exact site of monastic foundation unknown
^{≈}	Identification ambiguous or confused

Locations with names in italics indicate possible duplication (misidentification with another location) or non-existent foundations (either erroneous reference or proposed foundation never implemented) or ecclesiastical establishments with a monastic name but lacking actual monastic connection.

Trusteeship
EH	English Heritage
LT	Landmark Trust
NT	National Trust

Foundation	Image	Communities & provenance	Formal name or dedication & alternative names	References & location
Jarrow Priory ^{+}		Benedictine monks founded 681/2 by St Benedict Biscop and King Egfrid; raided by the Danes 794; destroyed in raids by the Danes c.867; destroyed by fire and abandoned 870; destroyed again? 973; destroyed by William the Conqueror 1069; Benedictine monks (community founded at Newcastle-upon-Tyne c.1073) restored/refounded 1074 (1072): transferred from Newcastle-upon-Tyne 1074; cell dependent on Durham, County Durham 1083; granted to Durham by Bishop William; dissolved 1536; granted to William, Lord Eure; remains partly demolished late-18th century; nave of St Paul's Church built on foundations of main Saxon monastery church; demolished 1782; part of church now in parochial use (EH)	The Priory Church of Saint Paul, Jarrow ____________________; St Paul's Monastery; Jarrow Monastery; St Paul's Priory; Priory of St Paul; St Paul's Monastery	54°58′49″N 1°28′20″W 54°58′49″N 1°28′19″W
Jarrow Friary?		Dominican Friars possible ref. to Yarm Friary, North Yorks	possibly Yarm Friary (Jarue Friary)	
Newcastle-upon-Tyne Austin Friars		Augustinian Friars (under the Limit of York) founded before 1291 by Lord Ross; dissolved 1539; granted to John, Duke of Northumberland 1551/2; utilised by the Council of the North; in use as a military storehouse until sold 1605 and dismantled; Holy Jesus Hospital, currently in use as a museum, lies within the site of the friary church		54°58′15″N 1°36′28″W
Newcastle-upon-Tyne Blackfriars ^		Dominican Friars (under the Visitation of York) founded c.1239 (or 1260) by Sir Peter and Sir Nicholas Scott; dissolved 1538; granted to the Mayor and burgesses of Newcastle-upon-Tyne 1543/4; surviving cloister buildings later used as company halls and almshouses; restored 1978-81; currently in use as restaurant, workshops and tourist information centre		54°58′19″N 1°37′10″W
Newcastle-upon-Tyne Friars of the Sack		Friars of the Sack founded 1267; dissolved 1307 on the suppression of the order; house granted to the Carmelite Friars (see below)		54°58′06″N 1°36′46″W
Newcastle-upon-Tyne Greyfriars ^{#}		Franciscan Friars Minor, Conventual (under the Custody of Newcastle) founded before 1237; dissolved 1539; Observant Franciscan Friars transferred 1498; dissolved 1534; Franciscan Friars Minor, Conventual; 1534; dissolved		54°58′23″N 1°36′46″W
Newcastle-upon-Tyne Monastery (?)		purported early monastery — evidence lacking (Note: Newcastle-upon-Tyne, early monastery — T. Tanner, Notitia Monastica, p.391: "But of these old monks here I have yet met with no particular account")	'Castrum vel civitas monachorum' ("Monkchester") (Note: ibid.)	
Newcastle-upon-Tyne Priory		Benedictine monks — from Evesham, Worcestershire founded c.1073; transferred to Jarrow 1074		
Newcastle-upon-Tyne — St Bartholomew's Priory		Benedictine nuns founded before 1086; possibly dissolved (re)founded shortly before 1135(?); dissolved 3 January 1540	St Bartholomew	
Newcastle-upon-Tyne Trinitarians		Trinitarians founded 1360 by William Wakefield on the former site of Carmelite Friars (see immediately below); dissolved 1539; granted to Richard Gresham and Richard Billingford 1545/6	St Michael; Holy Trinity ____________________; Acton's Hospital	54°58′15″N 1°36′13″W
Newcastle-upon-Tyne Whitefriars, earlier site		Carmelite Friars founded before 1262 by Richard I; transferred to the former site of the Friars of the Sack (see immediately below) 1307, when the site was divided by the new town wall; hospital of St Michael founded on the site 1360 (see immediately above)		54°58′15″N 1°36′13″W
Newcastle-upon-Tyne Whitefriars		formerly the house of Friars of the Sack; Carmelite Friars (see above) (community founded at earlier site (see immediately above) 1262); transferred here 1307; granted to Richard Gresham and Richard Billingford 1545/6; remains demolished 1960s		54°58′06″N 1°36′46″W
Tynemouth Priory		Saxon monastery apparently both monks and nuns purportedly founded after 653 (after 627 / after 634) by King Oswald; nuns settled here from various locations during Danish raids; completely destroyed 865-75; apparently restored 10th century; monks transferred to Durham, Durham 1083; Benedictine monks dependent on St Albans, Hertfordshire; repaired and refounded c.1083 (1085) by Robert de Mowbray, Earl of Northumberland, by consent of the King and the Archbishop of Canterbury (EH)	St Mary St Mary and St Oswin	55°01′04″N 1°25′04″W
Wearmouth Abbey, Monkwearmouth		Benedictine? monks founded 674, built by St Benedict Biscopius; destroyed in raids by the Danes c.867; destroyed by Malcolm III, King of Scotland 1070; Benedictine monks refounded 1074(1075); priory cell 1083; dissolved 1536; granted to Thomas Whitehead 1545/6	The Abbey Church of Saint Peter, Wearmouth ____________________; Monkswearmouth Abbey; Monkwearmouth Abbey; Wermouth Cell	54°54′47″N 1°22′30″W

== See also ==
- List of monastic houses in England
