= Swinford, Leicestershire =

Village in Leicestershire, England

Coordinates: 52.40965°N 1.16495°W

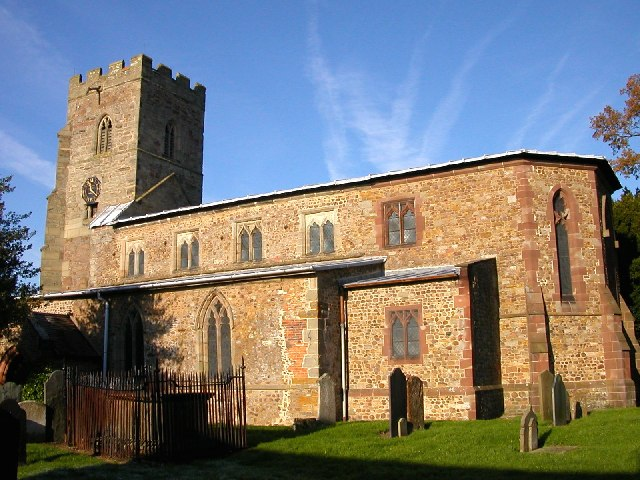
All Saints Church, Swinford

Swinford is a nucleated village and civil parish in the Harborough district of the English county of Leicestershire. The population of the civil parish at the 2011 census was 586. It used to be on the former A427, which led under the M1, to Catthorpe. The parish church is All Saints, a 12th-century Norman rebuilding of an earlier Saxon church with a 14th-century square bell tower and a Grade II* listed building. The local pub is The Chequers on the High Street, formerly known as Chequer Inn.

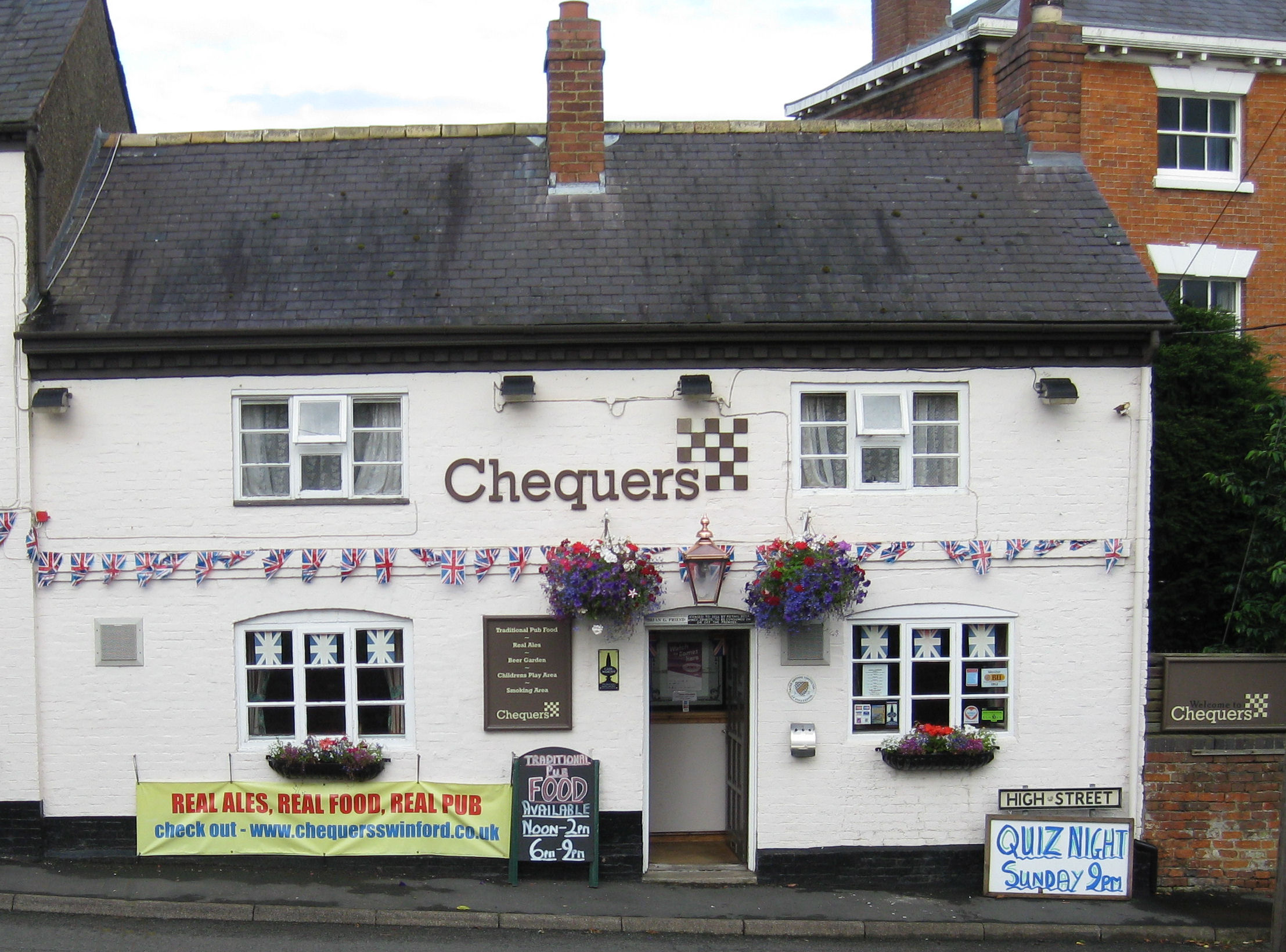
Chequers pub, High Street

Its Anglo-Saxon name was "Suin Heaford" meaning "the head of the Suin" referring to a tributary of the River Avon.

A wind farm was constructed north of the village at Swinford Corner and commenced operation in Autumn 2012. It consists of 11 turbines, each of 2 MW capacity and is operated by Vattenfall.

== See also ==
- Swinford Preceptory
