= Brothers of Penitence =

Christian monastic order, c. 1200–1541

- Fratres Saccati
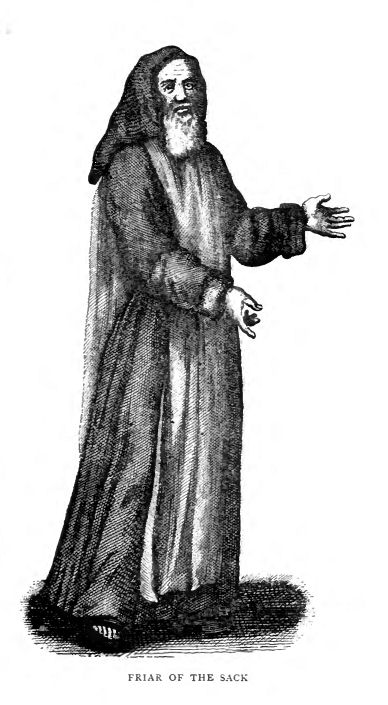
- Depiction of a Friar of the Sack
- Abbreviation: Friars of the Sack; Boni Homines; Bonshommes
- Formation: c. 1200
- Founder: Unknown
- Dissolved: 1541
- Type: Catholic religious order
- Purpose: Monastic life of penitence and poverty
- Headquarters: Italy (original)
- Region served: Spain, France, England
- Parent organization: Order of Saint Augustine (after 1256)
- Affiliations: Roman Catholic Church

The Brothers of Penitence or Friars of the Sack (Fratres Saccati) were an Augustinian community also known as Boni Homines or Bonshommes, with houses in Spain, France and England.

== History ==
The "Friars of the Sack" were so called because of their simple clothing, usually made from sackcloth. The order was founded in Italy and followed a rule based on that of St. Augustine. The Brothers of Penitence lived a severe life. They wore rough sackcloth and walked either barefoot or with simple wooden sandals. The friars of the order never ate meat and were only allowed to drink water.

The Fratres Saccati arrived in Spain sometime in the thirteenth century. They had a house at Saragossa (Spain) in the time of Pope Innocent III (d. 1216) and one about the same time at Valenciennes (northern France). They had one house in Paris, in a street called after them, the rue de Sachettes.

In 1257, they were introduced into England. Matthew Paris records under this year that "a certain new and unknown order of friars appeared in London", duly furnished with credentials from the Pope; and he mentions later that they were called from the style of their habit Fratres Saccati. They were first settled at Aldersgate Without but by 1272 had moved to Lothbury.

Paris' notation about a "novum ordum" has led some to suggest that the Fratres Saccati were the order quite soon afterwards established at Ashridge (Hertfordshire) and Edington (Wiltshire), though this was repudiated in a 1943 article in the journal Speculum by Richard Emory, who attributes the original connection to Helyot's Dictionnaire des Ordres Religieux, compiled in Paris in the mid-19th century.

The members in Italy joined the Bonites, founded by John Buoni, which in turn became part of the new mendicant order, the Hermits of Saint Augustine, established in 1256 by Pope Alexander IV with the papal bull Licet Ecclesiae catholicae. The order was suppressed as a result of a decree of the Council of Lyons in 1274; this led to the closure of the European friaries of the order, and the members were absorbed into other orders.

== Friaries in England ==
Besides London and perhaps Ashridge and Edington, several monastic houses have been linked to the order.

The Leicester Friary was founded before 1283 and is thought to have been just beyond the Western Gate of Leicester's old town walls. The friary was closed before 1295. There is a record of another house in Bishop's Lynn. A seal matrix of a Prior of this house was found in King's Lynn in 1992.<https://finds.org.uk/database/artefacts/record/id/197412> Walter Bette of South Clenchwarton, and Catherine his wife, made a grant to 'the brothers of penitence of Jesus Christ' of land with buildings in North Lynn. Queen Eleanor took the "Sac-Friars" under her protection and gave them land and a building on Colechurch Street in the City of London, in the parish of St Olave's Church. Other houses were in Cambridge (1258), Norwich (1266), Newcastle (1272), and Lincoln. At the Dissolution of the Monasteries, the house in Canterbury was given to the city.
