= List of monastic houses on the Isle of Man =

List of the monastic houses on the Isle of Man is a catalogue of abbeys, priories, friaries or other monastic house on the Isle of Man.

== Legend ==
*	indicates current monastic function
+	indicates current non-monastic ecclesiastic function
^	indicates current non-ecclesiastic function
#	indicates no identifiable trace of the monastic foundation remains
~	indicates exact site of monastic foundation unknown

== List ==
Foundation	Image	Communities and provenance	Dedication and names	Location
Bemaken Friary		Franciscan Friars founded 1367; dissolved 1540; granted by the Crown to Thomas Hungate of the Royal Household 18 March 1543/4	Bemaccan Friary	
Douglas Priory ^		Cistercian nuns founded before 1226 purportedly by Rǫgnvaldr Guðrøðarson, King of the Isles. Dissolved 24 June 1540; granted by the Crown to Thomas Hungate of the Royal Household 18 March 1543/4; chapel converted used as coachhouse	St Mary; Supposed (doubtful) St Bridget (possibly St Mary and St Bridget)	54°08′53″N 4°29′38″W
Mirescog Monastery		Cistercian monks dependent on Rievaulx, Yorkshire; founded 1176; dissolved c.1200	Later called Sulby Grange	
Rushen Abbey		Savignac monks Dependent on Furness, Lancashire (Cumbria); Founded 1134/5, land granted by Óláfr Guðrøðarson, King of the Isles; Cistercian monks Orders merged 17 September 1147; Dissolved 1540; granted by the Crown to Thomas Hungate of the Royal Household 18 March 1543/4.		54°05′56″N 4°38′15″W

== See also ==
- List of abbeys and priories
- List of monastic houses in England
- List of monastic houses in Scotland
- List of monastic houses in Wales
- List of abbeys and priories in Northern Ireland
- List of abbeys and priories in the Republic of Ireland
- List of monasteries dissolved by Henry VIII of England
- Dissolution of the Monasteries
- List of English cathedrals
