= Heather, Leicestershire =

Village in Leicestershire, England

Coordinates: 52.693°N 1.424°W

Heather
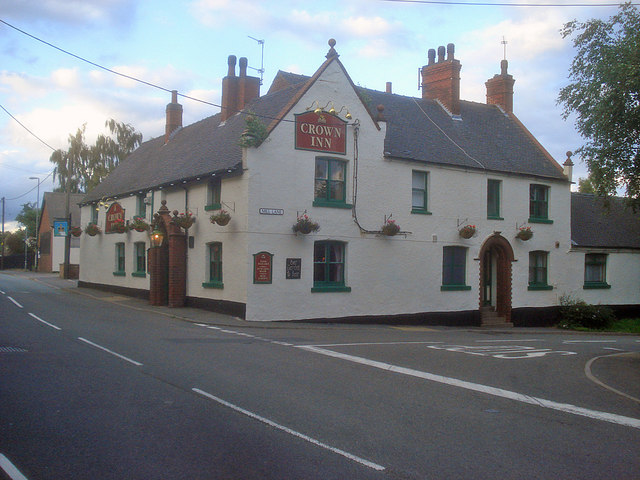
- The Crown Inn, in the centre of Heather

- Location within Leicestershire
- Population: 949
- OS grid reference: SK391107
- District: North West Leicestershire
- Shire county: Leicestershire
- Region: East Midlands
- Country: England
- Sovereign state: United Kingdom
- Post town: COALVILLE
- Postcode district: LE67
- Dialling code: 01530
- Police: Leicestershire
- Fire: Leicestershire
- Ambulance: East Midlands
- UK Parliament: North West Leicestershire

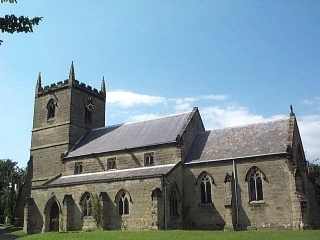
St John the Baptist Church, Heather

Heather (/ˈhiːðər/ HEE-dhər) is a village west of Ibstock in North West Leicestershire, England. The population of the civil parish was 949 at the 2001 census reducing to 920 at the 2011 census. In the Domesday Book of 1086, its name is recorded as Hadre, meaning "the heathland".

There was an Iron Age settlement immediately north west of the village. As part of an open cast coal mining application, this was excavated in 1990. It identified a settlement from the late 2nd century BC through to early second century A.D.

== History ==
The village's name means 'heathland'.

The parish church, dedicated to St. John the Baptist, was "established" in the 12th century as a chapel for the Knights Hospitallers of the adjacent Heather Preceptory which was founded before 1199. The current church dates from the early 14th-century, and is a Grade II* Listed Building.

== Coal mining and brickmaking ==
The coal mine at Heather opened in 1874 though some coal had been worked there even earlier. Brick making followed during the 20th century. In the 1970s and 1980s two huge open cast coal mines were opened up. The Coalville Farm opencast coal mine, between 1982 and 1996, extracted around eight million tons of coal. This area was subsequently restored to become the Sence Valley Country Park.

Following the refusal of a 1990 British Coal application for massive further open cast works, its successor, UK Coal applied for consent for a much smaller scheme. To the north of the village, it was the called the Long Moor open cast coal mine. Over a three-year period from 2007 to 2010 they extracted 725,000 tons of coal. Following restoration, the 76 hectares (190 acres) mine site was acquired by the Woodland Trust. With adjoining agricultural land this was promoted as the Flagship Diamond Wood of their campaign to create 60 new woods of 60 acres or more. It is a 186 hectares (460 acres) new woodland called Queen Elizabeth Diamond Jubilee Wood, and celebrated the 2012 Diamond Jubilee of Queen Elizabeth II.

== Village life ==
Heather Parish Church is dedicated to St John Baptist. The Anglican parishes of Heather and Ibstock are now the responsibility of the same clergyman (Rector of Ibstock). The village is famous for its Scarecrow and Music Festivals, usually held around July/August.

Heather was for 63 years the home of David Taylor, Labour MP for North West Leicestershire from 1997 until his death in 2009.

== See also ==
- Heather Preceptory
- Heather Saint Johns F.C.
