= Swinford Preceptory =

- Location within Leicestershire
- Interactive map of Swinford Preceptory

Monastery information
- Order: Knights Hospitaller
- Established: Before 1199
- Disestablished: 1540
- Mother house: from 1220 : Dalby Preceptory

People
- Founder: Robert Rivell

Site
- Location: Swinford, Leicestershire, United Kingdom
- Coordinates: 52.406143°N 1.178227°W
- Visible remains: None

Swinford Preceptory is a former house of the Knights Hospitaller located near to the village of Swinford, Leicestershire.

== History ==
The preceptory was founded before 1199, with land at Swinford donated to the Knights Hospitaller by Robert Rivell.

Only a small preceptory, it was under the control of Dalby Preceptory before 1220. By 1338, however, the preceptory had become a "camera" (a lesser establishment dependent upon another), under the administration of a seneschal and bailiff.

The Knights Hospitaller in England were disbanded in 1540, and their preceptories dissolved as part of King Henry VIII's Dissolution of the Monasteries.

== See also ==
- Dalby Preceptory
- Heather Preceptory
- Rothley Temple
