= Rothley Court =

Country house in Rothley, Leicestershire, England

Coordinates: 52°42′18.50″N 1°9′19.30″W

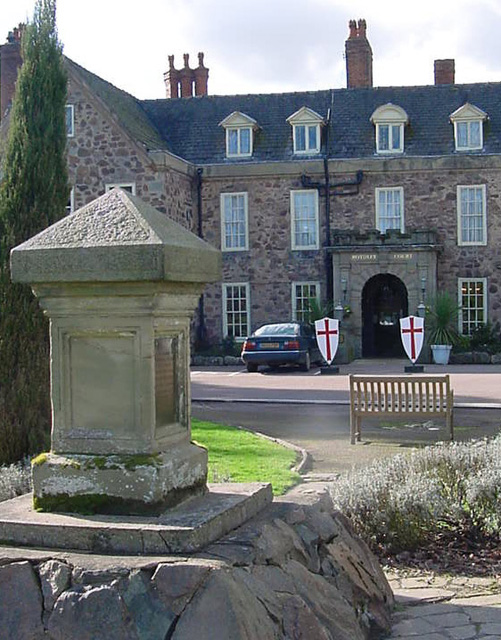
Rothley Court in 2008

Rothley Court is a country house at Rothley in Leicestershire, England. It was mentioned in the Domesday Book and later, as Rothley Temple, associated with the Knights Templar. At the Dissolution it became a private house and the seat of the Babington family; Thomas Babington Macaulay was born there in 1800. It now functions as the Rothley Court Hotel.

The preceptory's chapel and part of the domestic buildings still exist. Rothley Court incorporates part of the preceptory that was converted for residential use in the 16th century. Much of what can be seen today is from substantial renovation and extension works conducted by John Ely of Manchester, between 1894 and 1895. In 1951, Rothley Court and chapel were protected as Grade I listed buildings.

In 1988 Mike Gatting was sacked as England cricket captain after an alleged off-field indiscretion with a barmaid at the hotel.

== See also ==
- Rothley Temple
