= Lytham Priory =

English Benedictine priory

- Location within Lytham St Annes
- Interactive map of Lytham Priory

Monastery information
- Order: Benedictine
- Mother house: Durham Priory
- Dedication: St Cuthbert

People
- Founder: Richard Fitz Roger

Site
- Coordinates: 53.7441°N 2.9768°W
- Grid reference: SD3567227965

Lytham Priory was an English Benedictine priory in Lytham, Lancashire. It was founded between 1189 and 1194 by Richard Fitz Roger as a cell of Durham Priory. It was dedicated to Saint Cuthbert and lasted until Henry VIII dissolved the monasteries in the 1530s. In the 18th century, a manor house, Lytham Hall, was built on the site of the priory.

== History ==
Lytham, a settlement recorded in the Domesday Book of 1086 as Lidun, is situated on the Fylde coast, at the mouth of the River Ribble. By the 12th century, there was already a church at Lytham, dedicated to Saint Cuthbert. Between 1189 and 1194, Richard Fitz Roger of Woodplumpton gave the church and his land at Lytham to the monks of Durham Priory for the foundation of a Benedictine cell. Richard already had a personal connection to Durham; he was said to have experienced two miracles ascribed to Saint Cuthbert (whose cult was centred at Durham) and had previously travelled there to give thanks for those miracles. This may have been his motivation for donating land to that priory. It is unlikely that the monks of Durham held any land at Lytham up to that point. As a house dependent on Durham, Lytham Priory was small, with only two or three monks at a time.

Following the Dissolution of the Monasteries in the 1530s, the land occupied by Lytham Priory came into the possession of local landowner Cuthbert Clifton who built a house there in the 17th century. This house was replaced by Lytham Hall, built 1757–1764.

== See also ==
- List of monastic houses in Lancashire
