= Aldermanshaw Priory =

- Location within Leicestershire
- Interactive map of Aldermanshaw Priory

Monastery information
- Order: Cluniac
- Established: C.1220-35
- Disestablished: In ruins c.1450
- Mother house: Bermondsey Abbey
- Diocese: Diocese of Lincoln

Site
- Location: Woodhouse, Charnwood Forest, Leicestershire, England
- Coordinates: 52°43′34″N 1°15′29″W
- Grid reference: SK50211452
- Visible remains: None. Materials may have been reused in later house on the site.

Aldermanshaw Priory is a former Cluniac Priory, located within the Charnwood Forest, in Leicestershire, England.

== History ==
Aldermanshaw Priory was founded c.1220-1235. It was a cell (a small monastery dependent upon a motherhouse) of Bermondsey Abbey, in London. The name is thought to refer to Alwin (or Alwinus) Child, the founder of the priory's motherhouse at Bermondsey.

The priory was in ruins by 1450.

The priory was in the hamlet of Woodhouse. In the 17th century a cottage, known as Alderman's Haw, was built on the site. The age of some of the stones used to construct the two-story rubble cottage suggests it may incorporate materials from the earlier priory.
