= Mobberley Priory =

Priory in Cheshire, England

Mobberley Priory was a priory in Cheshire, England.
