= Chester Franciscan Friary =

Former friary in Cheshire, England

Chester Franciscan Friary was a friary in Chester, England. It was established in the 1230s, and dissolved in 1538.
