= Chester Dominican Friary =

Former friary in England

Chester Dominican Friary was a friary in Cheshire, England.
