= Chester Grey Friary =

Friary in Cheshire, England

Chester Grey Friary was a friary in Cheshire, England.
