= Chester Friary of the Sack =

Former Friary in Cheshire, England

Chester Friary of the Sack was a friary in Cheshire, England. It was founded before 1274 and existed until after 1284.
