= Heather Preceptory =

Preceptory of the Knights Hospitaller

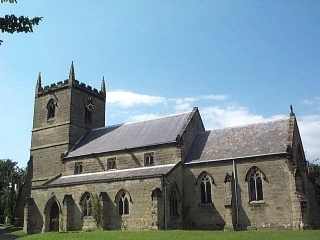
- The 14th-century St. John the Baptist Church, originally established as a chapel by the Knights Hospitaller.

- Location within Leicestershire
- Interactive map of Heather Preceptory

Monastery information
- Full name: From the mid 14th-century: Dalby and Heather Preceptory
- Order: Knights Hospitaller
- Established: before 1199
- Disestablished: 1540
- Mother house: Dalby Preceptory

People
- Founder: Ralph de Greseley

Site
- Location: Heather, Leicestershire, England
- Coordinates: 52.693299°N 1.424586°W
- Visible remains: Fragments incorporated into cellars of later house.

Heather Preceptory (pronounced: /hiːðər/; He-ther) was a preceptory of the Knights Hospitaller, established in the village of Heather, Leicestershire, United Kingdom.

== History ==
Heather preceptory was established as a preceptory (monastery) of the Knights Hospitaller, and was founded by Ralph de Greseley as early the reign of King John (1199–1216).

Heather was an independent preceptory until around 1338, when it was reduced to the status of a "camera", a lesser establishment dependent upon another. Heather was integrated with another preceptory of the Knights Hospitaller in Leicestershire, Dalby. The two were then referred to as the "Dalby and Heather Preceptory". Dalby seems to have taken the leading role, as it was where the joint preceptory was administered from and where the Preceptor was based. Rothley Preceptory was similarly merged before 1371.

The Knights Templar also owned the manor of Heather, and by the 14th-century were renting it and its associated lands, only directly farming their lands at Dalby and Rothley Preceptories.

From around 1500 the land at all three preceptories, Dalby, Heather and Rothley, appears to have been rented out. In 1535, the three combined preceptories are recorded as providing the order with a sizable annual income of £231. 7s. 10d.

The three preceptories were dissolved in 1540. The land belonging to the preceptory at Heather was granted to Oliver St. John and Robert Thornton.

== Remains ==
The site of the preceptory is currently occupied by a Georgian manor house. Nothing of the preceptory stands above ground; however, the manor's cellars incorporate remains of medieval walls. Medieval paving stones have also been found in the area.

== See also ==
- Dalby Preceptory
- Rothley Preceptory
- Swinford Preceptory
