= Leicester Friars of the Sack =

- Location within Leicestershire
- Interactive map of Leicester Friars of the Sack

Monastery information
- Order: The Friars of the Order of the Penitence of Jesus Christ
- Established: Before 1283
- Disestablished: Before 1295
- Diocese: Lincoln

Site
- Location: Leicester, Leicestershire, United Kingdom
- Coordinates: 52.630668°N 1.144485°W
- Visible remains: None

Leicester Friars of the Sack is a former Friary of The Friars of the Order of the Penitence of Jesus Christ (more commonly known as the "Brothers of Penitence" or the "Friars of the Sack"), in Leicester, England.

== History ==
The Friars of the Sack were so called because of their simple clothing usually made from sackcloth. The order was founded in Italy and first arrived in England during the reign of King Henry III; opening their first friary in London in 1257. Pope Gregory X suppressed the order in 1274 leading to the closure of the European friaries of the order. Those in England, however, continued to operate without Papal legitimacy; some until the final dissolution of the monasteries under King Henry VIII.

The Brothers of Penitence lived a severe life. They wore rough sackcloth and walked either barefoot or with simple wooden sandals. The friars of the order never ate meat and were only allowed to drink water.

The Leicester Friary was founded before 1283. The friary is thought to have been located just beyond the Western Gate of Leicester's old town walls. The friary was closed before 1295, when Oliver Sutton, Bishop of Lincoln, forbade the former site from being converted for secular use.

Only one Prior is known: Richard, who is recorded in 1283.
