= List of monastic houses in Cumbria =

Locations of monastic houses in Cumbria
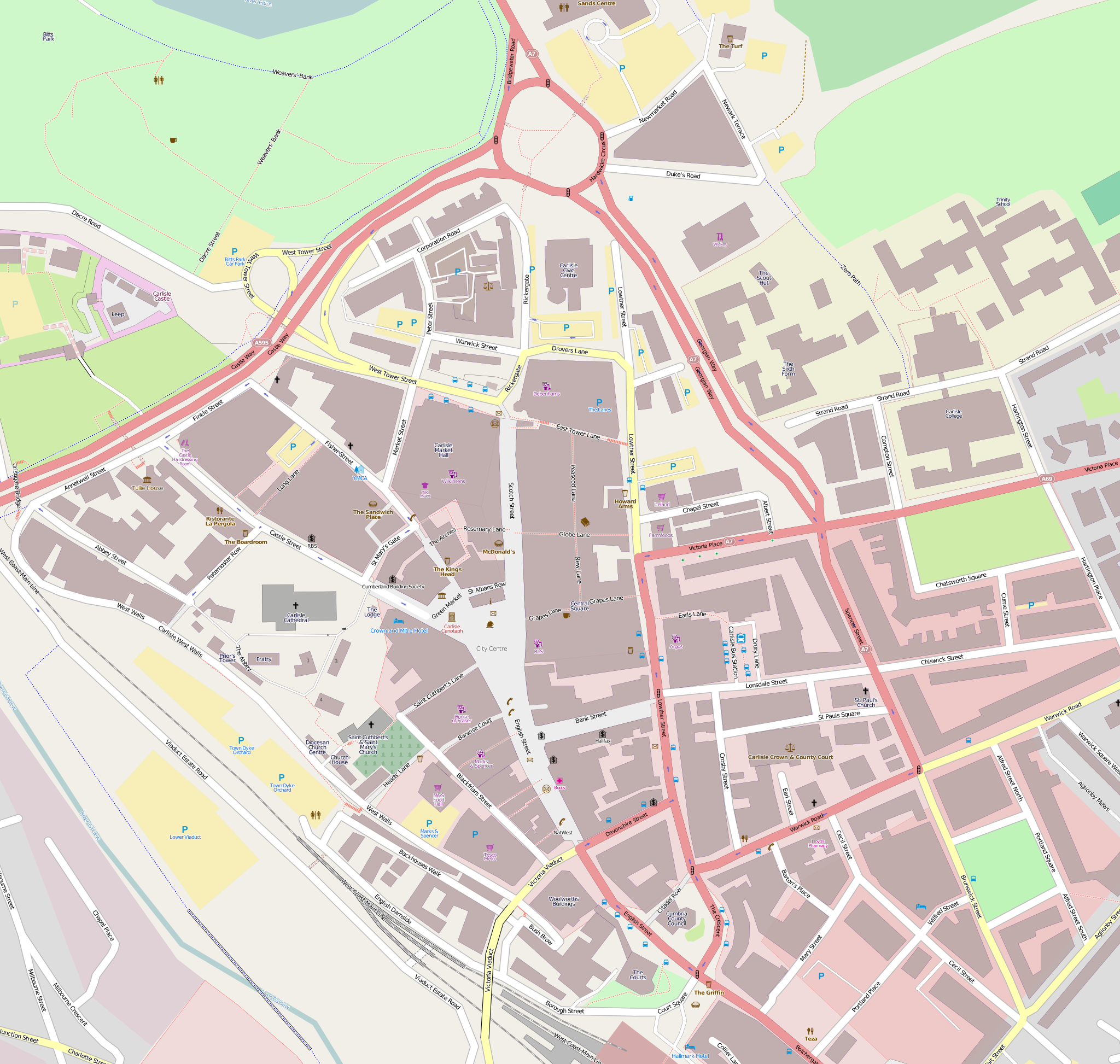
Locations of monastic houses in Carlisle

The following is a list of monastic houses in Cumbria, England, a modern county including all of the former Cumberland and Westmorland and parts of Lancashire.

Alien houses are included, as are smaller establishments such as cells and notable monastic granges (particularly those with resident monks), and also camerae of the military orders of monks (Knights Templar and Knights Hospitaller). Monastic hospitals are included where they had the status or function of an abbey, priory, or preceptor/commandery.

Abbreviations and key

Status of remains
Symbol	Status
None	Ruins
*	Current monastic function
^{+}	Current non-monastic ecclesiastic function (including remains incorporated into later structure)
^	Current non-ecclesiastic function (including remains incorporated into later structure) or redundant intact structure
^{$}	Remains limited to earthworks etc.
^{#}	No identifiable trace of the monastic foundation remains
^{~}	Exact site of monastic foundation unknown
^{≈}	Identification ambiguous or confused

Locations with names in italics indicate possible duplication (misidentification with another location) or non-existent foundations (either erroneous reference or proposed foundation never implemented) or ecclesiastical establishments with a monastic name but lacking actual monastic connection.

Trusteeship
EH	English Heritage
LT	Landmark Trust
NT	National Trust

Foundation	Image	Communities & provenance	Formal name or dedication & alternative names	References & location
Appleby Whitefriars ^{#}		Carmelite Friars founded 1281 (c.1290-3) by Lords Vescy, Percy, and Clifford; dissolved 1539		54°34′52″N 2°29′23″W
Armathwaite Nunnery		Benedictine nuns founded before 1200 (6 January 1089 dubiously purported), endowed by William Rufus; dissolved 1537; granted to William Gryme or Carleil 1552/3	(church dedicated to Jesus Christ and the Blessed Virgin Mary) ____________________; Armethwaite Nunnery	54°46′43″N 2°43′17″W
Bleatarn Grange		Cistercian monks grange dependent on Byland, Yorkshire; founded during the reign of Henry II		
Calder Abbey		Savignac monks — from Furness; founded 10 January 1135-1137 by Ranulf Meschin, first Lord of Cumberland; community released from jurisdiction of Furness to that of Savigny; establishment ruined; transferred to Hood 1138; Savignac monks — from Furness; refounded c.1142-3, rebuilt; Cistercian monks orders merged 17 September 1147; dissolved 1536; granted to Thomas Leigh 1538/9; now in private ownership without public access	Caldre Abbey	54°26′39″N 3°27′55″W
Carlisle Cathedral Priory ^{+}		purported monastery of monks and nuns founded 686 on land granted by Ecgfrith, King of Northumbria; destroyed in raids by the Danes c.875; rebuilt before 1092 by William Rufus and Walter, a Norman priest; secular canons from before 1092; Augustinian Canons Regular founded 1122 and built by Henry I; Augustinian Canons Regular — Arroasian(?) (Note: Carlisle Priory — Ludo Milis asserts that Arroasian affiliation was introduced prior to Bishop Malachy, however J. C. Dickinson, The Origins of the Augustinian Canons and their introduction into England, indicates there is no evidence for the change) 1133; dissolved 1540: last prior appointed as first dean of the cathedral; episcopal diocesan cathedral founded 1133; extant	The Priory Church of the Holy Trinity, Carlisle The Cathedral Church of The Holy and Undivided Trinity, Carlisle (1133) ____________________; Carlisle Priory	54°53′41″N 2°56′19″W
Carlisle Blackfriars		Dominican Friars (under the Visitation of York) founded (before?) 1233 outside the city walls, but ordered to be demolished for a highway; moved 1237; dissolved 1539		54°53′34″N 2°56′10″W
Carlisle Greyfriars		Franciscan Friars Minor, Conventual (under the Custody of Newcastle) founded 1233; church destroyed by fire in 1292 and rebuilt; dissolved 1539		54°53′35″N 2°56′02″W
Cartmel Priory ^{+}		Augustinian Canons Regular founded 1189/94 by William Marshall, Baron of Cartmel and Earl of Pembroke; dissolved 1536/7; granted to John Holcroft 1540/1; church now in parochial use	Kertmel Priory	54°12′04″N 2°57′08″W
Chapel-le-Wood Cell		Premonstratensian Canons cell dependent on Cockersand		54°22′06″N 2°46′30″W
Conishead Priory ^{^}, Ulverston		originally a hospital founded 1160 (after 1154); Augustinian Canons Regular founded 1188 (before 1181) by Gamel de Pennington (or William de Lancaster II); still occupied by canons at 16 October 1536; country house named 'Conishead Priory' built on site: and currently the home of the Buddhist Manjushri Kadampa Meditation Centre	The Priory Church of the Blessed Virgin Mary, Conishead ____________________; Conisheved Priory	54°10′23″N 3°04′05″W
Dacre Abbey		monks founded before 731; destroyed c.875 by Vikings; refounded before 926; Parish Church of St Andrew built to the south of the site		54°37′56″N 2°50′17″W (probable)
Furness Abbey		Savignac monks — from Tulketh (Lancashire) dependent on Savigny; (founded 4 July 1124 at Tulketh by Stephen, Count of Boulogne); transferred from Tulketh 1126 (1124-7); Cistercian monks orders merged 17 September 1147; dissolved 1537; granted to Thomas Cromwell; (EH)	Furnes Abbey	54°08′08″N 3°11′53″W
Hawkshead Grange		Cistercian monks grange of Furness; founded c.1160; 17th century Hawkshead Old Hall incorporates remains of grange; currently in use as a farmhouse		54°22′49″N 3°00′12″W
Holmcultram Abbey ^{+}, Abbeytown		Cistercian monks — from Melrose, Scotland founded 30 December 1150 by Henry, son of David, King of Scotland; dissolved 1538; church in parochial use until destroyed in an arson incident 9 June 2006; roof and plasterwork replaced; restoration ongoing, church in use again (2012)	Holm Cultram Abbey; Holme Cultram Abbey	54°50′43″N 3°16′59″W
Holme Eden Abbey		Benedictine nuns removed from Fort Augustus, Invernessshire 1921; dissolved 1983; formerly Holme Eden Hall; altered for use as a nursing home	Priory of Saint Scholastica	54°54′18″N 2°49′31″W
Kirkby Lonsdale	Benedictine monks manor of St Mary's Abbey, York — incorrectly asserted to have been a cell			
Kirkby Stephen	Benedictine monks estate of St Mary's Abbey, York — incorrectly asserted to have been a cell			
Lanercost Priory ^{+}		Augustinian Canons Regular — possibly from Pentney, Norfolk founded c.1166 (or 1169) by Robert de Villibus, Lord of Gilleisland; dissolved 1537; granted to Thomas Lord Dacre part converted into private house named 'Dacre Hall' church now in parochial use; (EH)	The Priory Church of Saint Mary Magdalene, Lanercost	54°57′57″N 2°41′44″W
Nunnery near Kirkoswald		Benedictine nuns house named 'Nunnery House' built on site		54°46′44″N 2°43′17″W
Penrith Friary		Augustinian Friars (under the Limit of York) founded c.1291; dissolved 1539; house named 'The Friarage' built on site 1717		54°39′51″N 2°44′55″W
Preston Patrick (?)Abbey		Premonstratensian Canons daughter house of Cockersand; founded after 1192(?); transferred to Shap before 1201; house named 'Challons Hall' built on or near site	The Abbey Church of Saint Mary Magdelene, Preston Patrick ____________________; Preston Abbey	54°14′26″N 2°42′27″W (possible)
Ravenstonedale Priory		Gilbertine Canons founded before c.1200; dissolved 1539(?); Parish Church of St Oswald built immediately to the south of the site	Ravenstonedale Cell	54°25′59″N 2°25′46″W
St Bees Priory ^{+}		nuns cell? founded before c.640?, during the reign of King Oswald by Bega; brief existence (Note: St Bees Priory - John Leland Itinerary and others, possibly mistakenly, identify Bega with Hieu of Hartlepool); transferred to Hartlepool, Northumbria (County Durham); or founded after 850 (c.900) by Bega — possible brief existence, though more likely an anchorites cell; Benedictine monks daughter house of St Mary's, York; founded not before c.1120 by William Meschin, on site of earlier church (c.900?); dissolved 16 October 1539; granted to Sir Thomas Challoner 1553/4; church now in parochial use	The Priory Church of SS Mary and Bega, Saint Bees, Saint Bees Priory ____________________; St Bee's Priory	54°29′38″N 3°35′37″W
St Constantine's Cells		Benedictine monks three cells, hermitage dependent on Wetheral; founded before 1112;		
Seaton Priory		Benedictine nuns daughter house of Nunburnholme, Yorkshire; founded c.1190-1200 by Henry Kirby; independent from after 1313; dissolved 1540; granted to Hugh Askue 1541/2; site now occupied by farmhouse named 'Seaton Hall'	Nunnery of Leakly, in Seaton; Seton Priory; Lekeley Priory	54°17′50″N 3°22′23″W
Shap Abbey		Premonstratensian Canons daughter house of Cockersand; (community founded at Preston Patrick before 1192(?)); transferred 1201 (1199), built (during the reign of Henry II) by Thomas Fitz Gospatrick; dissolved 1540; granted to Thomas Lord Wharton 1544/5; (EH)	Hepp Abbey	54°31′49″N 2°42′00″W
Wetheral Priory		Benedictine monks — from St Mary's, York dependent on York; founded 1106 by Ranulph Meschin, Earl of Cumberland; dissolved 20 October 1538; granted 1541/2	The Priory Church of Saint Constantine, Wetheral The Priory Church of the Holy Trinity, Saint Mary and Saint Constantine, Wetheral ____________________; Wetherall Priory	54°52′46″N 2°49′48″W

== See also ==
- List of monastic houses in England
