= Preston Greyfriars =

Friary in Preston, Lancashire, England

Coordinates: 53.75985°N 2.703108°W

Preston Friary (also known as Preston Greyfriars) was a Franciscan friary in Preston, Lancashire, England.

It was founded about 1221, and in 1260 Henry III granted the friars land for building. In 1267 Edmund, Earl of Lancaster gave funds for the building of the friary and he is therefore considered its founder.

In 1540 Henry VIII closed the friary as part of the dissolution of the monasteries and it became a dwelling house; later it became a building for housing criminals. It was demolished in 1860.

== Burials ==
- Sir Robert De Holland (d. 1242)
- Sir Thurstan De Holland (1220–1275)
- Robert Holland, 1st Baron Holand (c. 1283–1328)
