= List of monastic houses in Greater Manchester =

Locations of monastic houses in Greater Manchester

The following is a list of the monastic houses in Greater Manchester, England.

Alien houses are included, as are smaller establishments such as cells and notable monastic granges (particularly those with resident monks), and also camerae of the military orders of monks (Knights Templar and Knights Hospitaller). Monastic hospitals are included where they had the status or function of an abbey, priory, or preceptor/commandery.

Abbreviations and key

Status of remains
Symbol	Status
None	Ruins
*	Current monastic function
^{+}	Current non-monastic ecclesiastic function (including remains incorporated into later structure)
^	Current non-ecclesiastic function (including remains incorporated into later structure) or redundant intact structure
^{$}	Remains limited to earthworks etc.
^{#}	No identifiable trace of the monastic foundation remains
^{~}	Exact site of monastic foundation unknown
^{≈}	Identification ambiguous or confused

Locations with names in italics indicate possible duplication (misidentification with another location) or non-existent foundations (either erroneous reference or proposed foundation never implemented) or ecclesiastical establishments with a monastic name but lacking actual monastic connection.

Trusteeship
EH	English Heritage
LT	Landmark Trust
NT	National Trust

Foundation	Image	Communities & provenance	Formal name or dedication & alternative names	References & location
Gorton Monastery ^		Franciscan Friars; extant	The Church and Friary of St Francis	53°28′06″N 2°11′15″W
Kersal Priory		hermitage Cluniac monks alien house: cell, dependent on Lenton, Nottinghamshire; founded 1145-53: granted after 1143 by Ranulph 'de Gernon', Earl of Chester; became denizen: independent from 1392; dissolved 1538	St Leonard ____________________; Kershall Priory	53°30′36″N 2°17′19″W
Marland Grange ^{~}		Cistercian monks grange of Stanlow, Cheshire, then of Whalley; founded before 1212		53°35′43″N 2°11′52″W (approx: location unknown)
Warburton Priory ^{#}		Premonstratensian Canons cell, daughter house of Cockersand, Lancashire; founded c.1200 church of St Mary and St Werburgh granted to Cockersand by Adam of Dutton; abandoned before 1271	Warburton Cell	53°24′08″N 2°27′26″W

== See also ==
- List of monastic houses in England
