= Dalby Preceptory =

Monastery of the Knights Hospitaller in England

- Location within Leicestershire
- Interactive map of Dalby Preceptory

Monastery information
- Full name: From the mid 14th-century: Dalby and Heather Preceptory
- Order: Knights Hospitaller
- Established: before 1206
- Disestablished: 1540
- Controlled churches: Cameras: Heather Preceptory; Rothley Preceptory; Swinford Preceptory; Controlled Churches: Ashby Parva; Buckminster; Old Dalby; Swinford

Site
- Location: Dalby on the Wolds, Leicestershire, England
- Coordinates: 52.803327°N 0.99910°W
- Visible remains: Earthworks

Dalby Preceptory, also known as Dalby and Heather Preceptory, was a preceptory of the Knights Hospitaller, in the village of Old Dalby, Leicestershire, England.

== History ==
Land at Dalby was given to the Knights Hospitaller by Robert de Beaumont, 2nd Earl of Leicester (1104 – 5 April 1168) in return for other land. The Hospitallers are thought to have founded their preceptory on that land during the reign of King Henry II (reign 1154-1189); and it was definitely established before 1206.

Before 1199 the Hospitallers had gained lands at Isley Walton, Heather, Ravenstone and Swinford, as well as gaining the advowsons of the churches of Ashby Parva, Buckminster, Old Dalby and Swinford, before 1220.

Around 1338, Heather Preceptory came under the control of Dalby as a "camera", a lesser establishment dependent upon another. Heather preceptory was integrated with Dalby, the two then being referred to as the "Dalby and Heather Preceptory". Dalby seems to have taken the leading role, as it was where the joint preceptory was administered from and where the Preceptor was based. Rothley Preceptory was similarly merged with Dalby before 1371.

=== Preceptors of Dalby ===
- Robert of Sutton, occurs under Henry III or Edward I.
- Robert Cort, occurs 1326.
- John Larcher, occurs 1338.
- John Dingley, occurs 1363 and 1371.
- John Langstrothyr, occurs 1448.
- Thomas Newport, occurs 1503, died 1522.
- Henry Babbington, occurs 1525.
- John Babbington, died 1534.
- Henry Poole, 1535/6 - 1540.
