= List of monastic houses in Rutland =

Locations of monastic houses in Rutland

The following is a list of the monastic houses in Rutland, England.

Alien houses are included, as are smaller establishments such as cells and notable monastic granges (particularly those with resident monks), and also camerae of the military orders of monks (Knights Templar and Knights Hospitaller). Monastic hospitals are included where they had the status or function of an abbey, priory, or preceptor/commandery.

Abbreviations and key

Status of remains
Symbol	Status
None	Ruins
*	Current monastic function
^{+}	Current non-monastic ecclesiastic function (including remains incorporated into later structure)
^	Current non-ecclesiastic function (including remains incorporated into later structure) or redundant intact structure
^{$}	Remains limited to earthworks etc.
^{#}	No identifiable trace of the monastic foundation remains
^{~}	Exact site of monastic foundation unknown
^{≈}	Identification ambiguous or confused

Locations with names in italics indicate possible duplication (misidentification with another location) or non-existent foundations (either erroneous reference or proposed foundation never implemented) or ecclesiastical establishments with a monastic name but lacking actual monastic connection.

Trusteeship
EH	English Heritage
LT	Landmark Trust
NT	National Trust

== Listing ==
Foundation	Image	Communities and provenance	Formal name or dedication and alternative names	References & location
Brooke Priory ^{#}		Augustinian Canons Regular priory cell dependent on St Mary's Abbey, Kenilworth, Warwickshire founded before c.1153 by Hugh de Ferrero; dissolved 1535–6; granted to Antony Coope 1536/7	St Mary	52°38′48″N 0°45′04″W
Edith Weston Priory ^{~}		Benedictine monks alien house: cell, dependent on St-Georges, Bocherville founded c.1114 by William de Tancarville, sold to the Carthusians at Coventry 1394; granted to William, Marquis of Northampton 1550/1		52°38′26″N 0°38′05″W (probable)

== See also ==
- List of monastic houses in England
