= Standon Priory =

Monastery in Hertfordshire, England

Coordinates: 51.880647°N 0.011013°W

Standon Priory was a priory in Hertfordshire, England.
