= List of monastic houses in County Durham =

Locations of monastic houses in County Durham

The following is a list of the monastic houses in County Durham, England.

Alien houses are included, as are smaller establishments such as cells and notable monastic granges (particularly those with resident monks), and also camerae of the military orders of monks (Knights Templar and Knights Hospitaller). Monastic hospitals are included where they had the status or function of an abbey, priory, or preceptor/commandery.

Abbreviations and key

Status of remains
Symbol	Status
None	Ruins
*	Current monastic function
^{+}	Current non-monastic ecclesiastic function (including remains incorporated into later structure)
^	Current non-ecclesiastic function (including remains incorporated into later structure) or redundant intact structure
^{$}	Remains limited to earthworks etc.
^{#}	No identifiable trace of the monastic foundation remains
^{~}	Exact site of monastic foundation unknown
^{≈}	Identification ambiguous or confused

Locations with names in italics indicate possible duplication (misidentification with another location) or non-existent foundations (either erroneous reference or proposed foundation never implemented) or ecclesiastical establishments with a monastic name but lacking actual monastic connection.

Trusteeship
EH	English Heritage
LT	Landmark Trust
NT	National Trust

== Alphabetical listing ==
Foundation	Image	Communities & provenance	Formal name or dedication & alternative names	References & location
Barnard Castle Friary (?)		Augustinian Friars (under the Limit of York) founded 1381: licensed by Neville, Archbishop of York, land granted by Thomas Beauchamp, Earl of Warwick; possibly not established, but if so failed before 1387?		54°32′25″N 1°55′28″W (possible)
Baxterwood Priory		Augustinian Canons Regular — possibly from Gisborough, Yorkshire via Haswell founded 1180; transferred from Haswell after 1180 (possibly before Haswell was built); dissolved 1196; lands appropriated by Finchale Priory	Priory Church of the Blessed Virgin Mary, Baxterwood ____________________; Bactanesford Priory	54°46′35″N 1°36′15″W
Bradbury Cell		Benedictine monks chapel and cell dependent on Nun Monkton, Yorkshire founded 12th century		54°39′19″N 1°31′16″W
Clare Abbey, Darlington		Franciscan nuns — from Scorton Hall founded 1857, property granted by Sir Caranby Haggerston; transferred to Herefordshire, amalgamating with the house at Much Birch; Hospitaller Order of Saint John of God	The Abbey Church of Saint Clare, Darlington	
Durham Cathedral Priory ^{+}		secular canons episcopal diocesan cathedral founded 997 (995); extant; founded 995 (997), built by Bishop Aldhun; Benedictine monks founded 1093 (or 1083) by Bishop William of St Carileph, who expelled the seculars; dissolved 1539	The Abbey Church of Saint Mary and Saint Cuthbert at Durham The Cathedral Church of Christ and Blessed Mary the Virgin, Durham	54°46′24″N 1°34′33″W
Durham Greyfriars		Franciscan Friars Minor, Conventual (under the Custody of Newcastle) founded before 1239; dissolved before 1240(?), friars apparently settled at the chapel of St Mary, but on meeting with opposition transferred to Hartlepool	Hartlepool Friary	
Durham — St Anthony's Priory *		Minoresses founded at the former vicarage of St Nicholas Parish Church; Society of the Sacred Mission; extant	St Antony's Priory, Durham	54°46′42″N 1°34′19″W
Ebchester Nunnery		nuns founded before 660 by St Ebba (purportedly daughter of King Ethelfrid); destroyed in raids by the Danes c.875; reference to hermitage or chapel mid-12th century and 1241 (Chapel of St Mary, Yareshale (Yareshaugh)) possibly on site, private chapel of Bishops of Durham before mid-15th century	St Ebbas Nunnery	54°53′23″N 1°50′45″W (possible)
Egglestone Abbey		Premonstratensian Canons — from Easby, Yorkshire daughter house of Easby; founded between c.1190 and c.1195, probably by Ralph Moulton: land granted by Ralph de Moulton, sub-tenant of Ralph de Lenham, who ratified the grant 1198; refounded 1537; dissolved 5 January 1540; granted to Robert Shelley 1548/9; converted into a house 1548, then labourers cottages; (EH)	The Blessed Virgin Mary and St John the Baptist ____________________; Egleston Abbey	54°31′53″N 1°54′19″W
Finchale Priory		Benedictine monks cell dependent on Durham; 1115 (or 1128) by Ranulf, Bishop of Durham who permitted St Godrick to establish his hermitage before 1170; becoming priory dependent on Durham 1196; confirmed to Durham by Hugh Pudsey, Bishop of Durham; dissolved 1538; granted to the Dean and Chapter of Durham 1534/5; (EH)	The Blessed Virgin Mary and St John the Baptist St John the Baptist and St Godric	54°49′05″N 1°32′25″W
Gateshead House		monks founded before 653; apparently abandoned when monks left for Ireland		
Hartlepool — St Hilda's Monastery		probably monks and nuns founded c.640 by Hieu, an Irishwoman (possibly St Bega) placed in charge by St Aidan destroyed 800?	St Hilda's Monastery	54°41′44″N 1°10′51″W
Hartlepool Greyfriars		Franciscan Friars Minor, Conventual (under the Custody of Newcastle) transferred from Durham, before 1240; dissolved 1538		54°41′48″N 1°10′47″W
Hartlepool Friary?		Dominican Friars probably copyist's error ref. to Franciscan Friary (see immediately above)		
Haswell Grange		Benedictine monks endowment — possibly from Gisborough, Yorkshire; transferred to Baxterwood after 1180, probably prior to any buildings being erected; becoming a grange under Finchale		54°47′16″N 1°27′20″W
Jarrow Priory	Historical county location. See entry under List of monastic houses in Tyne and Wear			
Jarrow Friar?	Historical county location. See entry under List of monastic houses in Tyne and Wear			
Neasham Priory		Benedictine nuns founded before 1156 (before 1163) purportedly by Lord Dacres; dissolved 1539–40; granted to James Lawson 1540/1; house named 'Neasham Abbey' built near site 19th century	St Mary ____________________; Nesham Priory; Nesseham Priory	54°29′06″N 1°30′13″W
Norton Monastery?		St Mary's Church incorporates remnants of a church built c.1000 — no reference of pre-Conquest community, but size suggests more than a parochial church; granted to St Cuthbert's, then to Chester-le-Street Cathedral		
Owton Priory		Gilbertine Canons charter confirming founded 1204 by Alan de Wilton, probably never established (though possibly a grange at Owton Grange nr Brierton)	St Mary ____________________; Oveton in Hartness Priory;Owton in Harness Priory	
Samford Priory?		Benedictine monks probably confused for Stamford Priory, Lincolnshire (Note: 'Samford Priory' - given by Cardinal F. A. Gasquet, English Monastic Life, (1924 ed), pp.272 & 302: 'List of English Religious Houses' (possibly from MacKenzie E. C. Walcott, Church Work and Life in English Minsters (1879), Vol 2: 'English Student's Monasticon', p. 198))		
South Shields Monastery		Saxon monks and nuns founded 648 by St Aidan for St Hilda; Benedictine? nuns refounded? c.686; destroyed ? 865–75	Wherhale Monastery?; Wyrale Monastery	
Wearmouth Abbey	Historical county location until Tyne and Wear created in 1974. See List of monastic houses in Tyne and Wear			

== See also ==
- List of monastic houses in England
