= Rothley Temple =

Preceptory in Leicestershire, England

Rothley Preceptory
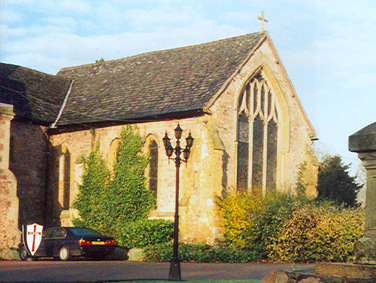
- The Templar Chapel built c.1240; incorporated into a later building

- Location within Leicestershire
- Interactive map of Rothley Preceptory

Monastery information
- Other name: Rothley Temple
- Order: Knights Templar; From 1313: Knights Hospitaller
- Established: c.1231
- Disestablished: 1540
- Mother house: from c.1371: Dalby Preceptory

Site
- Location: Rothley, Leicestershire
- Coordinates: 52.7056°N 1.1478°W
- Visible remains: The Preceptory's chapel and part of the domestic buildings still remain as part of the Rothley Court Hotel.

Rothley Temple, or more correctly Rothley Preceptory, (pronounced /ˈroʊθli/ Rowth-Ley) was a preceptory (a religious establishment operated by certain orders of monastic knights) in the village of Rothley, Leicestershire, England, associated with both the Knights Templar and the Knights Hospitaller.

The preceptory's chapel, constructed by the Knights Templar, is currently part of the Rothley Court Hotel.

== History ==
=== Foundation ===
Rothley Preceptory was established around the year 1231; however, records show "The Poor Fellow-Soldiers of Christ and of the Temple of Solomon" (more commonly known as the Knights Templar) owned land at Rothley as early as the reign of King John (1199–1216). On the establishment of the preceptory King Henry III granted the Knights Templar the manor and church at Rothley. The preceptory would come to own land in 13 neighbouring villages, including granges used for farming at Baggrave (near Hungarton) and Gaddesby. The knights of the preceptory also owned the Manor at Gaddesby.

Around 1250, the preceptory was recorded as having a yearly revenue of £62. 10s. 5d., which was used to help fellow Knights Templar in Acre, in modern-day Israel.

In 1284, King Edward I granted the preceptory's knights a charter, permitting them to hold a weekly market, on a Monday, at Rothley, and an annual fair in honour of Saint Barnabas each June. This lasted until 1306, when King Edward issued the knights with another charter permitting them to hold a market and festival at their manor at Gaddesby, instead of at Rothley. This charter afforded a weekly market on a Wednesday and an annual festival in July in honour of Mary Magdalen.

=== End of the Knights Templar ===
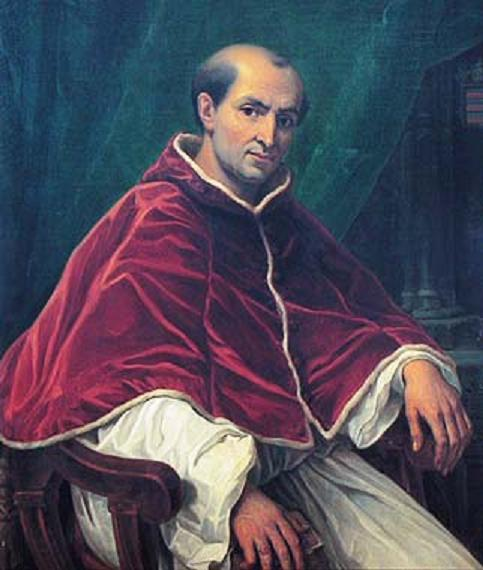
Pope Clement V who, under the instructions of King Philip IV of France, issued the Pastoralis Praeeminentiae suppressing the Knights Templar

After losing the Holy Land in 1291, the Knights Templar lost purpose, power and influence, and were forced to move their headquarters to France. Shortly after, King Philip IV of France, heavily indebted to the order, started a campaign against the Knights Templar, using his puppet Pope Clement V. King Philip had Pope Clement arrest the Templars for various offences, including: apostasy, idolatry, heresy, obscene rituals, homosexuality, financial corruption, fraud, and secrecy. Under torture, many confessed.

With these confessions, and after more bullying from the French King, on 22 November 1307 Pope Clement issued a Papal bull, known as the Pastoralis Praeeminentiae, which instructed the monarchs of Europe to arrest all of the Knights Templar, and to seize their properties on behalf of the church. King Philip had thereby freed himself of his debts.

Initially, King Edward II of England refused to believe the allegations against the Templars. However, in 1308, Rothley Preceptory, together with the Templars' other possessions in England, were seized by the Crown.

An inventory of the dissolved preceptory from 1309 reveals that the preceptory consisted of both a hall and a chapel (thought to have been built around 1240), and had over 350 sheep.

=== Knights Hospitaller ===
In 1313 the preceptory and its lands were transferred to the Military Hospitaller Order of St John of Jerusalem, more commonly known as the Knights Hospitaller.

Rothley does not appear to have been administered by the Knights Hospitallers as an independent preceptory, and was merged with the joint Dalby and Heather Preceptory by 1371, another Hospitaller establishment within Leicestershire. One Preceptor then controlled all three of these preceptories from Dalby.

From around 1500 the land at all three preceptories – Dalby, Heather and Rothley – appears to have been rented out. In 1535, the three combined preceptories are recorded as providing the order with a sizable annual income of £231. 7s. 10d.

In the 15th century the Hospitallers made alterations to the chapel at the preceptory.

=== Dissolution ===
The preceptory was suppressed and dissolved in 1540. The Lordship of the Manor of Rothley, previously held by the preceptory, was from 1565 until 1845 in the hands of the Babington family. The Babingtons chose not to demolish the preceptory's chapel, and it was incorporated, along with some fragments of the preceptory's domestic buildings, into the house they built on the site.

== Later history ==
=== Abolition of the slave trade ===
Rothley Temple eventually passed to Thomas Babington (1758–1837) who was a prominent figure in the Clapham Sect and the fight to abolish the slave trade. A close friend of William Wilberforce, Babington and Wilberforce met frequently at Rothley Temple whilst drafting their anti-slavery bill. Babington later served as MP for Leicester and High Sheriff of Leicestershire and was buried in the chapel at Rothley Temple.

A large stone monument and plaque stand outside the building today, commemorating the building's, and Babington's, part in the abolition of slavery. In 1800, Rothley Temple was the birthplace of the historian Thomas Babington Macaulay (1800–1859, later Lord Macaulay) named after his uncle.

=== Rothley Court ===
The preceptory's chapel and part of the domestic buildings still exist, and are now part of the Rothley Court Hotel. Rothley Court, originally a stately home, incorporates part of the preceptory that was converted for residential use in the 16th century. Much of what can be seen today is from substantial renovation and extension works conducted by John Ely of Manchester, between 1894 and 1895.

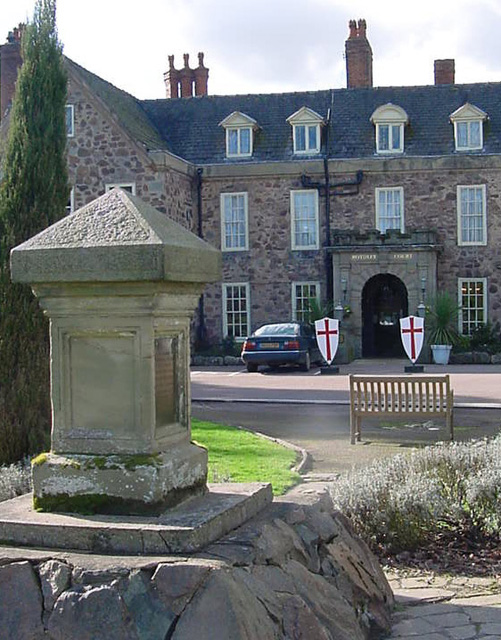
Rothley Court Hotel, which incorporates part of the former preceptory. In the foreground stands the monument recognising Rothley Temple's role in the Abolition of the Slave Trade

The chapel was heavily restored in 1896. In 1951, Rothley Court and the chapel were protected as Grade I Listed Buildings.

A number of stone artefacts and partial grave slabs have been discovered over the years around the chapel, where they can be seen. This includes a recently restored effigy of a Templar knight, originally discovered in Rothley Churchyard in 1790; following a £2,000 restoration completed in 2011, the effigy has been placed within the chapel at Rothley Temple.

Rothley Temple is also the name of a lodge of the Freemasons. The lodge, founded in 1961/62, took its name from the preceptory because of its association with the Knights Templar.

== Preceptors ==
The Preceptor was head of the preceptory. Similar to an Abbot with an Abbey and a Prior with a Priory, the Preceptor was in charge of the preceptory's church and land, and managed the brethren of the order who lived at the preceptory. The Preceptor was answerable to the Grand Master of his order.

Preceptors under the Knights Templar:

- Stephen of Todmershe.
- John Feversham.
- Walter of Ewenightewith.
- William of Wald.
- Alexander Blundus.
- William of Colewell, occurs 1271.

The Preceptors under the Knights Hospitallers: From around 1371, Rothley was controlled by the preceptor of Dalby Preceptory

- John Dingley, c.1371.
- John Langstrothyr, c.1448.
- Thomas Newport, died 1522.
- Henry Babbington, c.1525.
- John Babbington, died 1534.
- Sir Henry Poole, 1535/6 – 1540.

== See also ==
- Dalby Preceptory
- Heather Preceptory
