= List of monastic houses in Hertfordshire =

Locations of monastic houses in Hertfordshire

The following is a list of the monastic houses in Hertfordshire, England.

Alien houses are included, as are smaller establishments such as cells and notable monastic granges (particularly those with resident monks), and also camerae of the military orders of monks (Knights Templar and Knights Hospitaller). Monastic hospitals are included where they had the status or function of an abbey, priory, or preceptor/commandery.

Abbreviations and key

Status of remains
Symbol	Status
None	Ruins
*	Current monastic function
^{+}	Current non-monastic ecclesiastic function (including remains incorporated into later structure)
^	Current non-ecclesiastic function (including remains incorporated into later structure) or redundant intact structure
^{$}	Remains limited to earthworks etc.
^{#}	No identifiable trace of the monastic foundation remains
^{~}	Exact site of monastic foundation unknown
^{≈}	Identification ambiguous or confused

Locations with names in italics indicate possible duplication (misidentification with another location) or non-existent foundations (either erroneous reference or proposed foundation never implemented) or ecclesiastical establishments with a monastic name but lacking actual monastic connection.

Trusteeship
EH	English Heritage
LT	Landmark Trust
NT	National Trust

Foundation	Image	Communities & provenance	Formal name or dedication & alternative names	References & location
Ashridge Priory		monastery or college of the Precious Blood; Bonshommes monks founded 1283 by Edmund, Earl of Cornwall; dissolved 16 November 1539	the Precious Blood	51°47′58″N 0°33′34″W
Barden Priory?		Augustinian Canons Regular possibly Berden, Essex or the hospital at Bigging (Berdene in Anstey)	St Mary	
Cathale Priory		Benedictine nuns founded before 1189(?) (c.1200) probably by William de Mandeville; dissolved before 1240; granted to the nuns of Cheshunt by Henry de Bohun; canons removed; chapel survived to 1613 when land acquired by James I; chapel remains extant 1830s		51°41′37″N 0°07′29″W
Cheshunt Priory		Benedictine nuns founded before 1183; dissolved 1536; granted to Sir Anthony Deny 1536/7	Cestrehunt Priory; Chesthunt Priory	51°43′03″N 0°01′08″W
Flamstead Priory		Benedictine nuns founded c.1150 (during the reign of Stephen) by Roger de Toney; dissolved 1537; granted to Sir Richard Page 1539/40; site now occupied by Beechwood Park School	Flamsted Priory	51°49′09″N 0°29′05″W (possible)
Hertford Priory ^{#}		Benedictine monks founded before 1093 (during the incumbency of Abbot Paul and during the reign of William the Conqueror (Note: Hertford Priory: Cobbett)) by Ralph de Limesy and granted to St Albans, Hertfordshire after 1077; dissolved 1538; granted to Sir Antony Denny and his wife 1537/8; conventual church demolished after 1540; passed to Sir Thomas Wiley who built the private chapel of St John, demolished 1680 on the orders of the Bishop of Lincoln; site now occupied by parish church	St Mary	51°47′59″N 0°04′31″W
Hertford Trinitarian Priory		lepers' hospital of St Mary Magdelene (founded before 1199) taken over by Trinitarians; Trinitarian monks founded c.1261; apparently under Easton, Wiltshire until 1448 as a hospital; later under Moatenden; apparently abandoned before 1535(?)	St Mary Magdalene (before 1199) Holy Trinity and St Thomas Martyr c.1261	51°47′59″N 0°04′21″W
Hitchin Whitefriars		Carmelite Friars founded c.1317; dissolved 17 October 1538; granted to Edward Watson and H. Henderson 1546/7; site now occupied by Hitchin Priory Hotel, part of cloister arches still visible; 17th/18th century country house built on site	St Mary ____________________; Hitchin 'Priory'	51°56′42″N 0°16′44″W
Hitchin Priory		Gilbertine Canons (Note: Hitchin Priory: mistakenly recorded as a nunnery by T. Tanner, Notitia Monastica) founded 1361-2 by Edward de Kendale; dissolved 1538	St Saviour	
Hitchin Minster		Saxon minster founded before 11th century (references 10th & 11th century); parochial church before 1086		
Muresley Priory, nr Ivinghoe		Benedictine nuns founded between 1107 and 1129, reputedly by Walter Giffard, bishop of Winchester (who died 1129), (or c.1160 or 1133); community evicted; granted to Sir John Dance c.1537	St Margaret ____________________; Meursley Priory; Mursley Nunnery; St Margaret's Priory; St Margaret's in the Wood, Meuresley; St Margaret's de Bosco; Ivinghoe Nunnery; Ivinghoe Priory; Ivanhoe Monastery	51°47′30″N 0°31′10″W
Kings Langley Priory		Dominican Friars (under the Visitation of Cambridge) founded before 1308; dissolved 1538; Dominican nuns — from Dartford refounded 1557; dissolved 1558: nuns transferred to Dartford	Kings Langley Blackfriars	51°42′46″N 0°27′37″W
Lannock		Knights Templar founded before 1148 (manor granted to Templars but no preceptory founded); Knights Hospitaller let privately 1338		
Markyate Priory ^{#}		hermitage before 1145; Benedictine nuns founded 1145 by Ralph de Langford, Dean and Chapter of St Paul's, through the influence of Geoffrey, Abbot of St Albans; apparently soon destroyed by fire; dissolved 1537; granted to George Ferrers; site now occupied by a manor house named 'Markyate Cell' built on priory remains; parochial church of St John the Baptist built at the south corner of the site	Holy Trinity ____________________; Mergate Priory; Market-Street Priory	51°50′38″N 0°27′52″W
Mirdial Priory?		purported Augustinian Canons Regular (evidence lacking)	St Mary	
New Biggin Priory ^{#}		Gilbertine Priory priory cell founded 1361-2 by Sir Edward de Kendale; dissolved 1538; granted to John Cokke 1544/5; residence built on site 1585; converted to almshouses c.1812	St Saviour ____________________; Hitchin Nunnery	51°56′54″N 0°16′31″W
Redbourn Priory		Benedictine monks cell dependent on St Albans; founded 1178 by Abbot Simon or Abbot Warin built by John, Bishop of Ardfert; plundered by the French 1217; apparently abandoned before 1535; granted to John Cock 1539/40	St Amphibalus ____________________; St Amphibalus Priory; Redburn Priory	51°47′52″N 0°23′42″W
Rowney Priory ^(?)		Benedictine nuns founded c.1164 by Conan, Duke of Brittany and Earl of Richmond; plundered early 15th century; dissolved 11 September 1457; granted to the patron, John Fray, chief baron of the Exchequer, who established a chantry; confiscated by the Crown 1548; 19th century house built on site, said to incorporate fabric from the priory	St John the Baptist ____________________; Rowheing Priory; Rownay Priory	51°51′52″N 0°02′39″W
Royston Priory		Augustinian Canons Regular founded 1173-9 by Ralph de Rochester (on the site of a chapel built by his uncle Eustace de Merk) built in the time of Walter Walensis, Abbot of Colchester; dissolved 9 April 1537; granted to Robert Slete, Esq. 1540/1 priory church converted for parochial use as the Parish Church of St John the Baptist; a Georgian House also built on the site	The Priory Church of St John the Baptist and St Thomas the Martyr	52°02′52″N 0°01′18″W
St Albans Abbey ^{+}		Benedictine? monks founded c.793; lax? c.820; secular collegiate and nuns from before 940; Benedictine monks and nuns c.970 (976) to 1140; Benedictine monks from 1140; dissolved 5 December 1539; parochial thereafter; episcopal diocesan cathedral founded 1877; extant	The Cathedral and Abbey Church of Saint Alban, St Albans	51°45′02″N 0°20′34″W
St Albans Nunnery		Benedictine nuns — with regular priests or brethren; attached to the abbey, living near the almonry; founded before 940; transferred to Sopwell 1140		
St Mary de Pre Priory		leper hospital founded 1194 by Warin (Garinus), Abbot of St Albans; Benedictine nuns with regular priests or brethren c.1328; Benedictine nuns founded after 1352; abandoned 1528; annexed to St Albans; granted to Ralph Rawlet, Esq. 1540/1	St Mary de Pré Priory; St Mary de Pre Nunnery; De La Praye Nunnery	51°45′40″N 0°22′05″W (possible)
St Margaret's Priory		Benedictine nuns founded before 1129, possibly by William Giffard, Bishop of Winchester, grants confirmed after his death 1129; dissolved 1536	Ivinghoe Priory	
Sawbridgeworth Priory		Benedictine monks probable cell dependent on Westminster Abbey founded c.1135 (late in the reign of Henry I or during that of Stephen); conventual church now in parochial use as the Parish Church of St Mary the Great		51°48′44″N 0°09′10″E
Sopwell Priory		purportedly a hermitage prior to Benedictine foundation; Benedictine nuns founded 1140 by Geoffrey, Abbott of St Albans; subject to the abbess of St Albans c.1330; dissolved 1537	St Mary ____________________; Sopewell Priory	51°44′39″N 0°20′05″W
Standon Cell		Sisters of the Order of St John of Jerusalem dissolved c.1180: transferred to Sisters of St John Priory, Buckland, Somerset		
Standon Preceptory		Knights Hospitaller founded 1147 (before 1154) (during the reign of Stephen) by Gilbert de Clare, Earl of Hereford; dissolved before 1443–4; leased out 1330; revived; under a preceptor 1360; leased out before 1443–4		
Standon Priory		hermitage built by William the Anchorite; Benedictine monks alien house: cell dependent on Stoke by Clare, Suffolk founded 1173 and 1178 when Richard de Clare Earl of Hertford granted to his monks of Stoke the hermitage; dissolved c.1306; apparently reverted to a hermitage or chapel 1306; granted to Stoke College 1415	The Priory Church of St Michael of Salburn in Standon ____________________; Salburn Priory in Standon; Salburn Priory	51°52′50″N 0°00′39″W
Temple Dinsley Preceptory ^{#}		Knights Templar founded 1147 (during the reign of Stephen): granted by Bernard de Balliol, preceptory established later; dissolved 1308–12; Knights Hospitaller refounded 1324; let privately 1338; preceptory founded after 1338; leased to the preceptor of Ribstone and Mount St John 1498; let out privately 1507; granted by Henry VIII to Sir Ralph Sadler demolished 1712; site now occupied by The Princess Helena College built 1714	Temple Dynnesley Preceptory	51°54′33″N 0°16′59″W
Ware Priory ^{#+}		Benedictine monks alien house: dependent on St-Evroul; founded before 1081, with endowment by Hugo de Grentemaisnil; dissolved 1414; granted to the Carthusians at Sheen, Surrey (Greater London); granted by Henry VIII; The old rectory or manor house built on the site early-17th century, altered 18th and 19th century; conventual church much altered, now in parochial use as parish church of St Mary the Virgin;— little, if any, remaining monastic fabric		51°48′43″N 0°02′00″W
Ware Greyfriars		Franciscan Friars Minor (under the Custody of Cambridge) founded 1338 by Thomas second Lord Wake of Liddell, who received the king's permission in February 1338 to give to the Friars Minors property and land; dissolved 1538;; private residence 1544; incorporated into a house named 'The Priory'		51°48′40″N 0°02′06″W
Wormley Priory ^{+}		Augustinian Canons Regular cell, dependent on Waltham, Essex; founded after 1177 (when church and manor granted to Waltham) and before c.1260; dissolved c.1510(?): alienated from Waltham; church restored 19th century; now in use of parish church of St Laurence	St Lawrence ____________________; Prior Sancti Laurentii de Worem	51°44′06″N 0°02′20″W
Wymondley Priory, Little Wymondley		hospital founded before 1218 by Richard [de] Argentein; Augustinian Canons Regular founded soon after; hospital continued until 1290; dissolved 6 April 1537; granted to James Nedeham, surveyor of the king's works, 1541/2; site now occupied by a Tudor Tithe barn	St Mary ____________________; Little Wymondley Priory; Wymondesley Parva Priory	51°56′16″N 0°13′42″W

== See also ==
- List of monastic houses in England
