= List of monastic houses in Merseyside =

Locations of monastic houses in Merseyside

The following is a list of the monastic houses in Merseyside, England.

Alien houses are included, as are smaller establishments such as cells and notable monastic granges (particularly those with resident monks), and also camerae of the military orders of monks (Knights Templar and Knights Hospitaller). Monastic hospitals are included where they had the status or function of an abbey, priory, or preceptor/commandery.

Abbreviations and key

Status of remains
| Symbol | Status |
|---|---|
| None | Ruins |
| * | Current monastic function |
| ^{+} | Current non-monastic ecclesiastic function (including remains incorporated into later structure) |
| ^ | Current non-ecclesiastic function (including remains incorporated into later structure) or redundant intact structure |
| ^{$} | Remains limited to earthworks etc. |
| ^{#} | No identifiable trace of the monastic foundation remains |
| ^{~} | Exact site of monastic foundation unknown |
| ^{≈} | Identification ambiguous or confused |

Locations with names in italics indicate possible duplication (misidentification with another location) or non-existent foundations (either erroneous reference or proposed foundation never implemented) or ecclesiastical establishments with a monastic name but lacking actual monastic connection.

Trusteeship
| EH | English Heritage |
| LT | Landmark Trust |
| NT | National Trust |

| Foundation | Image | Communities & provenance | Formal name or dedication & alternative names | References & location |
|---|---|---|---|---|
| Birkenhead Priory | | Benedictine monks founded c.1150 by Hamon de Masci, Baron of Dunham Massey; dissolved 1536; granted to Ralph Worseley 1544/5 | St James the Great ____________________; Birkenhedde Priory; Bircheved Priory; Byrkett Priory; Birket-wood Priory | 53°23′22″N 3°0′41″W |
| Bromborough Monastery ^{+} | | built by Aethelflaed, apparently incorporating an earlier foundation; (also given as located in Devon (Note: Bromborough Monastery - Devon location given by J. Leland, Collectanea; W. M. Gallichan, Cheshire (1905), p.81 identifies location as Bromborough, Cheshire)) granted to the Abbey of St Werburgh 1152; irrevocably dilapidated before 1827; demolished 1827; successor church built on site from monastic material; demolished 1863–4; new church built just to the south of the site | | 53°19′59″N 2°58′44″W |
| Hilbre Island Monastery | | Benedictine monks founded after 1093; cell of Our Lady of monks, Chester; chapel (built before 1081) granted to Chester; apparently merely a hermitage, although a prior is attributed dissolved 1539 | St Mary ____________________; Ilbre Monastery; Hilbury Monastery; Holburgh Monastery | 53°22′52″N 3°13′23″W |

== See also ==
- List of monastic houses in England
