= List of monastic houses in North Yorkshire =

Locations of monastic houses in North Yorkshire
Locations of monastic houses in York
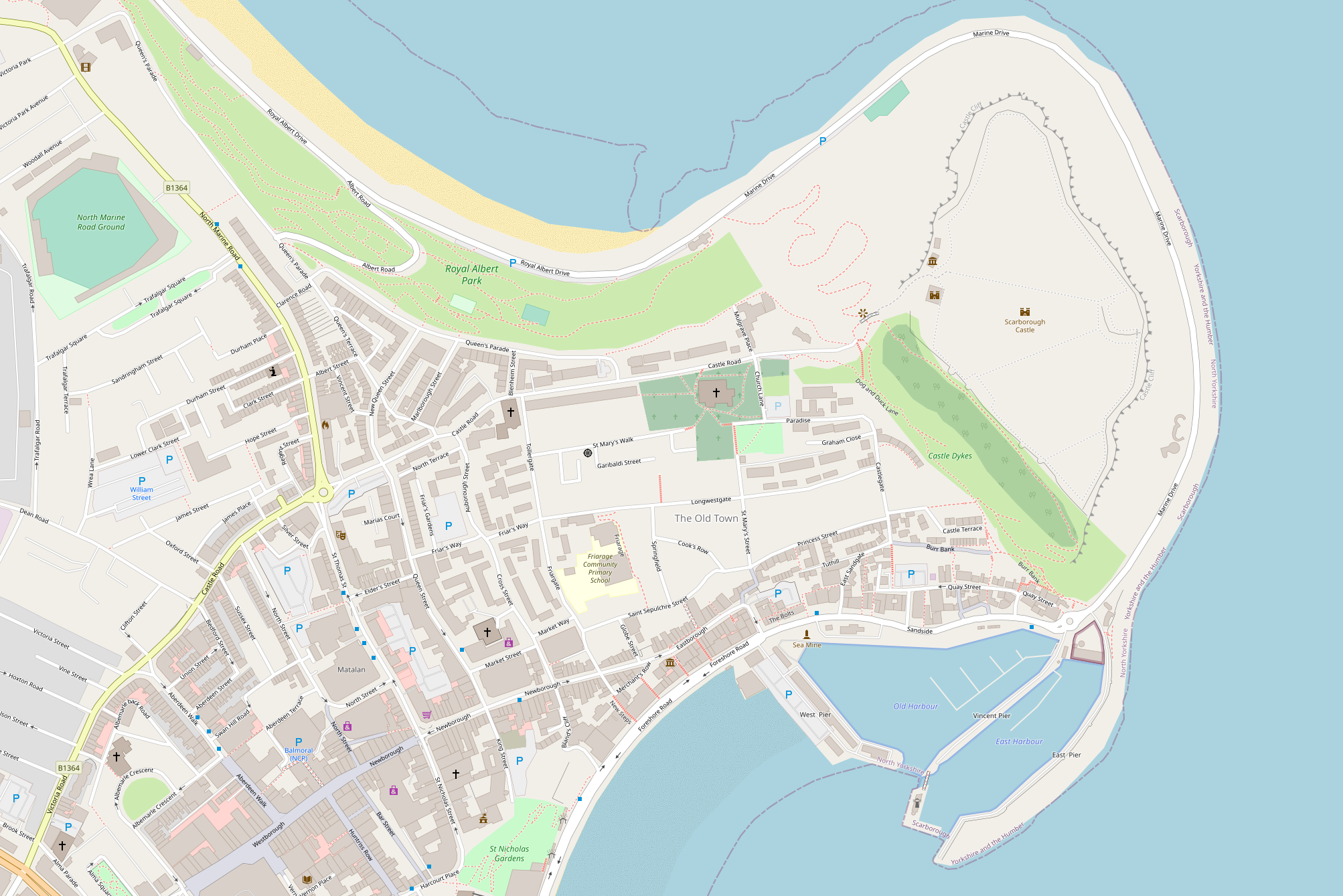
Locations of monastic houses in Scarborough

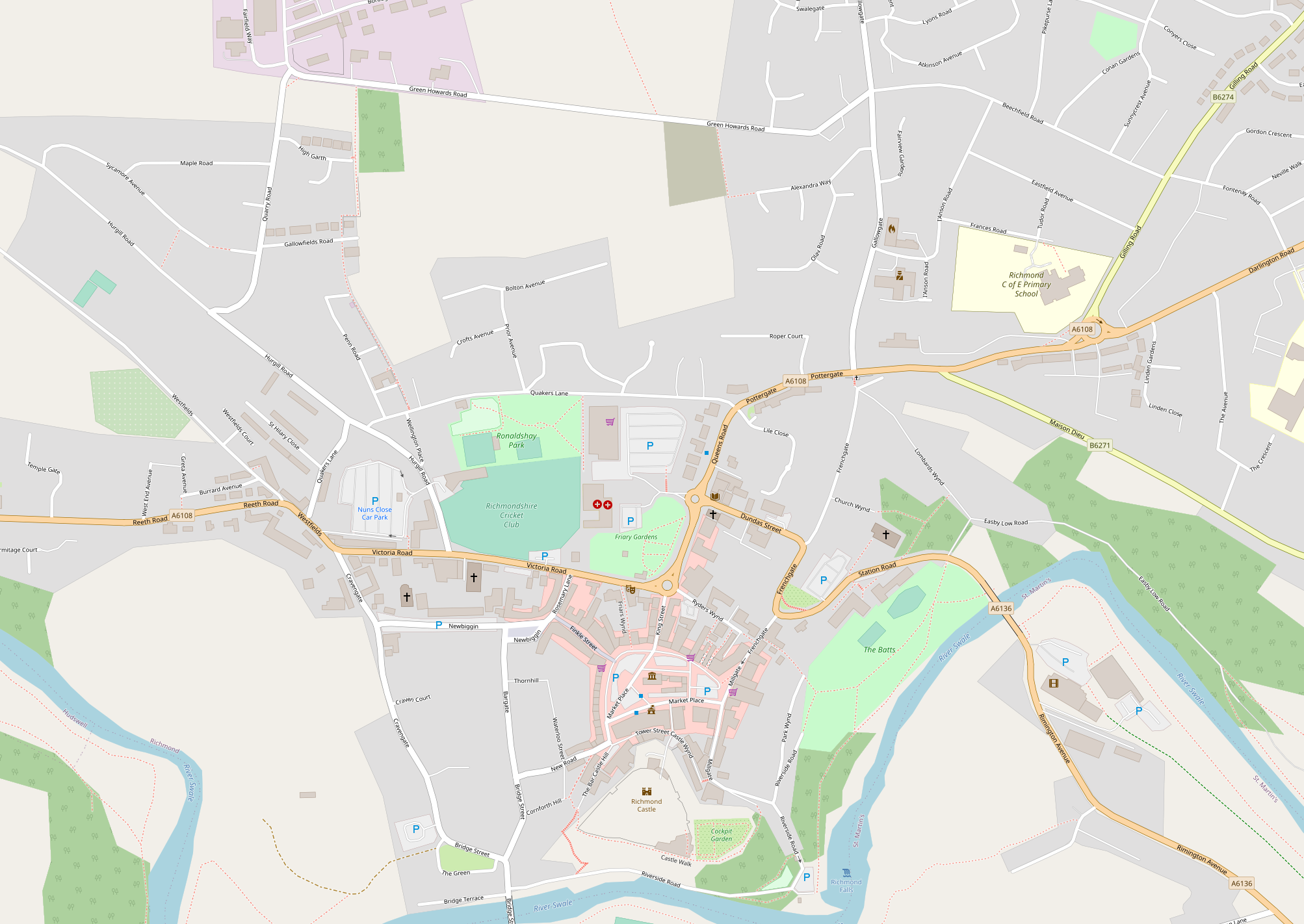
Locations of monastic houses in Richmond

The following is a list of monastic houses in North Yorkshire, England.

Alien houses are included, as are smaller establishments such as cells and notable monastic granges (particularly those with resident monks), and also camerae of the military orders of monks (Knights Templar and Knights Hospitaller). Monastic hospitals are included where they had the status or function of an abbey, priory, or preceptor/commandery.

Abbreviations and key

Status of remains
Symbol	Status
None	Ruins
*	Current monastic function
^{+}	Current non-monastic ecclesiastic function (including remains incorporated into later structure)
^	Current non-ecclesiastic function (including remains incorporated into later structure) or redundant intact structure
^{$}	Remains limited to earthworks etc.
^{#}	No identifiable trace of the monastic foundation remains
^{~}	Exact site of monastic foundation unknown
^{≈}	Identification ambiguous or confused

Locations with names in italics indicate possible duplication (misidentification with another location) or non-existent foundations (either erroneous reference or proposed foundation never implemented) or ecclesiastical establishments with a monastic name but lacking actual monastic connection.

Trusteeship
EH	English Heritage
LT	Landmark Trust
NT	National Trust

Foundation	Image	Communities and provenance	Formal name or dedication and alternative names	References and location
Allerton Mauleverer Priory		Benedictine monks cell dependent on York Benedictine Priory; founded after 1100 by Richard Malleverer; alien house: dependent on Marmoutier c.1110; dissolved c.1414; granted to King's College, Cambridge; foundation possibly associated with the 12th century rebuilding of St Martin's parish church	St Martin	54°00′27″N 1°22′33″W
Ampleforth Abbey *		Benedictine monks founded 1608; extant	The Abbey Church of Saint Lawrence the Martyr, Ampleforth	54°12′07″N 1°05′08″W
Arden Priory ^		Benedictine nuns probably founded before 1147 by Peter de Hoton (Hutton), confirmed by his lord, Roger de Mowbray; with regular priests or brethren from unknown date to after 1306; dissolved August 1536; granted to Thomas Culpeper 1540/1; house named 'Arden Hall' built on site, incorporates monastic remains (a chimney)	St Andrew	54°18′37″N 1°12′11″W
Basedale Priory		Cistercian nuns (community founded at Hutton c.1162); transferred from Nunthorpe c.1189: granted land here by Guy de Bovincourt; with regular priests or brethren from before 1197 to after 1239; dissolved 1539; granted to Ralph Bulmer and John Thynde 1544/5	St Mary ____________________; Baysdale Priory; Base Dale Hoton Priory	54°27′07″N 1°02′40″W
Begar Priory, near Richmond		Cistercian monks alien house: cell or grange(?) dependent on Bégard; founded between 1216 and 1272 (during the reign of Henry III); dissolved c.1414; granted to Eton College	The Blessed Virgin Mary ____________________; Begare Priory	
Bolton Priory ^{+}		Augustinian Canons Regular dependent on Huntingdon (Cambridgeshire); (community founded at Embsay 1120); transferred from Embsay 1154-5 (1151, or 1150-9) with the consent of Alice de Rumilly, patroness; founded 1154; independent from 1194/5; dissolved 29 January 1540; granted to Henry, Earl of Cumberland 1541/2; part of church now in parochial use as the Parish Church of St Mary	The Priory Church of the Blessed Virgin Mary and Saint Cuthbert, Bolton ____________________; Bolton Abbey	53°59′02″N 1°53′18″W
Byland Abbey		Cistercian monks (community founded at Hood 1138); transferred from Stocking 30 October 1177; dissolved 1539; granted to William Pykering 1540/1; (EH)	The Abbey Church of Saint Mary, Byland	54°12′12″N 1°09′31″W
Copmanthorpe Preceptory ^{$}		Knights Templar founded 1258, manor granted by William Malbys sometime before 1258; dissolved after 1292; amalgamated with Ribstone	The Preceptory of Copmanthorpe with the Castle Mills, York	53°54′33″N 1°07′16″W
Coverham Abbey ^		Premonstratensian Canons daughter house of Durford(?), Sussex; (community founded at Swainby before 1188 (c.1187)); transferred from Swainby 1197-1202, built by Ralph Fitz Robert, Lord of Middleham; dissolved 1536; part of abbey guest-house incorporated into a house	The Abbey Church of Saint Mary of Charity, Coverham ____________________; Corham Abbey	54°16′20″N 1°50′19″W
Cowton Grange		Cistercian monks grange dependent on Fountains; founded before 1145		
Crayke Monastery		site granted to St Cuthbert by King Egfrith 685; became a monastery no later reference		
Drax Priory ^{$}		Augustinian Canons Regular founded 1130-9 by William Paynel; dissolved 24 August 1535; granted to Sir Marmaduke Constable 1538/9	St Nicholas	53°44′52″N 0°59′24″W
Easby Abbey		Premonstratensian Canons — from Newhouse, Lincolnshire founded 1152 (1151) by Roald, Constable of Richmond Castle; dissolved 1536/7; (NT)	The Abbey Church of Saint Agatha, Easby	54°23′53″N 1°43′00″W
East Cowton Preceptory		Knights Templar founded c.1142, benefactor Roger Mowbray; dissolved 1308-12; Knights Hospitaller maintained a chaplain here, with no preceptory c.1338	Temple Cowton Preceptory	54°25′17″N 1°31′25″W
Egglestone Abbey	Historical county location. See entry under List of monastic houses in County Durham			
Ellerton Priory		Cistercian nuns founded 1170 (during the reign of Henry II), built by Warnerus Dapifer, Earl of Richmond; dissolved 1538-9 (1537); granted to John Aske 1541/2; became part of the manor of Ellerton; now in private ownership without public access	St Mary ____________________; Priory of Ellerton in Swaledale; Elreton Priory	54°22′19″N 1°52′45″W
Embsay Priory		Augustinian Canons Regular dependent on Huntingdon (Cambridgeshire); founded late-1120/early-1121, site and church of the Holy Trinity, Skipton granted to Reginald, prior, by William Meschin and his wife Cecilia de Rumilly; transferred to Bolton 1154-5 (1151, or 1150-9); quarried for use in Embsay Kirk, built c.1780, and a number of outhouses	The Blessed Virgin Mary St Cuthbert St Mary and St Cuthbert	53°59′07″N 1°59′06″W
Fors Abbey		Savignac monks daughter house of Byland; founded 1145, land granted by Acharius Fitz Bardolph (Akarius fitz Bardolf); Cistercian monks orders merged 17 September 1147; joined by monks from Stocking 10 March 1150; later boarded at Stocking; transferred to Jervaulx 1156 by Conan, Duc de Bretagne, Earl of Richmond; became an estate of Jervaulx, known as 'Dale Grange'; 13th century window incorporated into outbuilding of Chantry Farm	The Blessed Virgin Mary ____________________ de Caritate	54°18′46″N 2°06′05″W
Foukeholme Priory ^{#}		Benedictine nuns founded c.1200(?) (during or before the reign of John) probably by a member of the de Colville family; dissolved after 1349, possibly died out during the Black Death	St Stephen	54°20′23″N 1°18′56″W
Foulbridge Preceptory		Knights Templar founded before 1226; dissolved 1308-12; Knights Hospitaller apparently intended to maintain preceptory here; secular bailiff 1338		54°12′12″N 0°36′01″W
Fountains Abbey		Cistercian monks founded 27 December 1132; mentored from Clairvaux; dissolved 26 November 1539; granted to Sir Richard Gresham 1540/1; (NT)	The Blessed Virgin Mary	54°06′36″N 1°34′52″W
Gilling Monastery		prior to 1873 considered the site of Ingetlingum monastery, now identified as Collingham: see entry under List of monastic houses in West Yorkshire		54°26′24″N 1°43′26″W (discounted)
Gisborough Priory		Augustinian Canons Regular founded 1119 by Robert de Brus; dissolved 1540; granted to Sir Robert Chaloner 1561/2; (EH)	St Mary ____________________; Guisborough Priory; Giseburne Priory	54°32′11″N 1°02′53″W
Goathland Cell (?)		hermitage for priests and brothers founded 1109-14; Benedictine monks cell ('quasi-cell') dependent on Whitby; after a few years the brothers were received as monks when they transferred to Whitby; described as a farm called 'Abbot House'		54°23′39″N 0°42′22″W (supposed)
Grosmont Priory ^{#}		Grandmontine monks alien house: dependent on Grandmont; founded c.1204, site granted by Johanna, daughter of William Fossard; became denizen: independent from c.1394-5; dissolved 1536; granted to Edward Wright 1543/4	St Mary	54°26′26″N 0°43′28″W
Hackness Priory ^{+}		Saxon Benedictine? monks and nuns founded before 680 by St Hilda; destroyed in raids by the Danes c.870 Benedictine monks — from Whitby cell founded c.1095 St Peter's church granted to Whitby by William de Percy; community located here briefly in 11th century because of coastal pirate raids; retained as a cell; dissolved 1539; Parish Church of St Peter incorporates Saxon features	St Peter	54°17′48″N 0°31′35″W; 54°18′05″N 0°30′44″W
Handale Priory ^{$}		possibly initially Benedictine nuns (if so, no record of when order changed); Cistercian nuns founded 1133 (1139) by William fitz Richard de Percy of Dunsley; dissolved 1539; granted to Ambrose Beckwith 1543/4	St Mary ____________________; Grendale Priory	54°31′52″N 0°52′51″W
Healaugh Park Priory ^		hermitage founded between 1160 and 1184, land granted to Gilbert, monk of Marmoutier by Bertram Haget, confirmed by his son Geoffrey, witnessed by Clement, Abbot of York; Augustinian Canons Regular founded 1218 by Alice, granddaughter of Bertram Haget and wife of Jordan de S Maria; dissolved 1535; granted to James Gage 1539/40; remains incorporated into buildings of Manor House Farm	St John the Evangelist ____________________; Healaugh Priory; Helagh Park Priory	53°54′40″N 1°15′45″W
Hood Abbey		hermitage before 1138; Savignac monks — from Furness, Lancashire (Cumbria) via Calder daughter house of Furness; founded 1138, land granted by Roger de Mowbray; transferred to [Old] Byland 1143; Augustinian Canons Regular — from Bridlington, (Yorkshire) temporary establishment whilst new abbey at Newburgh was under construction, 1143-45; became grange of Newburgh; dissolved 1539; farmhouse built on site	The Blessed Virgin Mary	54°14′03″N 1°13′39″W
Hutton Priory ^^{(?)}		Cistercian nuns possible priory founded c.1162 by Ralph de Nevill transferred to Nunthorpe c.1167; apparently medieval, possibly monastic remains incorporated into house called 'Home Farmhouse'	The Blessed Virgin Mary	54°30′32″N 1°05′25″W
Jervaulx Abbey		Cistercian monks from Fors daughter house of Byland; (community founded as Savignac at Fors 1145); founded here 1156 by Conan, Duc de Bretagne, Duke of Richmond; dissolved 1537; granted to Matthew, Earl of Lenox 1544/5; now in private ownership with public access	The Blessed Virgin Mary ____________________; Joreval Abbey	54°16′01″N 1°44′15″W
Keldholme Priory		Cistercian nuns founded before 1135 (during the reign of Henry I (Note: Keldholme Priory — foundation: W. Dugdale, (ed. by J. Caley &c) Monasticon Anglicanum, (1468); A History of the County of Yorkshire Victoria County History)) by Robert de Stuteville; convent established by 1142-3; priory founded 1154-66 (Note: Keldholme Priory — foundation: Early Yorkshire Charters, note x, p.93-4 (Christopher N. L. Brooke)); dissolved August 1535; granted to Ralph, Earl of Westmoreland 1538/9; house built on site before 1695; modern house now on site	St Mary ____________________; Duna Priory; Keldon Priory	54°16′00″N 0°54′56″W
Kildale Crutched Friars		Crutched Friars founded before 1310, granted land and chapel; dissolved before 1315: William Greenfield, Archbishop of York, prohibited completion of buildings 1312 and use of chapel 1314-5		
Kirkby Malham Cell ^{+?}		Premonstratensian Canons cell of West Dereham, Norfolk; founded before 1189: church of St James granted to Dereham by Adam fitz Adæ; dissolved 1539; current church of St Michael the Archangel possibly the conventual church	St James	53°51′48″N 1°19′57″W
Kirkdale Monastery ^{$(?)}		Saxon monastery traditionally founded before 664 by St Cedd; (previously considered to have been the monastery of Laestingaeu, which is now identified as Lastingham); ruined 'minster' bought by Orm, son of Gamel who rebuilt it between 1055 and 1065 (during the reign of Edward the Confessor and Earl Tosti)	St Gregory	54°15′47″N 0°57′45″W
Kirkham Priory		Augustinian Canons Regular founded c.1122 by Walter Espec, Lord of Helmsley; planned after 1154 to convert to Cistercian as a daughter of Rievaulx with remaining Augustinians established in a new house in Linton, never transpired; dissolved 8 December 1539; granted to Henry Knyvet 1540/1; (EH)	Holy Trinity	54°04′59″N 0°52′37″W
Knaresborough Priory		Trinitarians founded c.1252: patronised by Richard, King of the Romans; destroyed by the Scots 1318; dissolved 30 December 1538; granted to Francis of Shrewsbury 1553; building called 'The Priory' built on early monastic foundations; remains in the garden of Abbey House	The Holy Trinity and St Robert ____________________; Knaresburgh Priory	53°59′45″N 1°27′26″W
Lastingham Abbey ^{+}		monks — from Tilbury, Essex founded after 654 by St Cedd; destroyed in raids by the Danes c.870?; Benedictine monks founded 1078, old monastery granted to Whitby by the King; transferred to St Olave's, York before 1086; conventual church in parochial use from 1228, possibly incorporating remains of Saxon monastic church	St Mary ____________________; Laestingaeu Monastery	54°18′16″N 0°52′57″W
Lazenby Grange		secular college or collegiate chapel, (also referred to as a hospital) founded 1290 possibly in the chapel of St John the Baptist; granted as a chantry chapel to Jervaulx 1443 or 1444; rebuilt and used as a grange; dissolved 1537/44: monks expelled: granted to Matthew, Earl of Lennox; subsequently passed through several ownerships until 1646	the Blessed Virgin Mary	54°23′10″N 1°27′49″W
Malton Priory ^{+}		Gilbertine Canons founded (c.)1150 (1147-54) by Eustace Fitz-John; dissolved December 1539; granted to Robert Holgate, Bishop of Llandaff 1540/1; part of church now in parochial use as the Parish Church of St Mary; claustral remains incorporated into house named 'Abbey House', built late-17th century	The Priory Church of Saint Mary, Old Malton; Old Malton Priory	54°08′33″N 0°46′44″W
Marrick Priory ^		Benedictine nuns founded 1154-8 by Roger de Aske (de Asac), confirmed by Conan, Duc de Bretagne, Earl of Richmond; suggested as being Cistercian at some point; with regular priests or brethren from 12th century to 1252; nave used as conventual church, choir as parochial church; dissolved 17 November 40; granted to John Uvedale 1545/6; conventual remains incorporated into Marrick Priory farmhouse; currently in use as an outdoor education and residential centre	St Mary ____________________; Maryke Priory	54°22′32″N 1°53′54″W
Marton Priory ^{$}		Augustinian Canons Regular and Canonesses/Benedictine(?) nuns double house founded between 1141 and 1154 (during the reign of Stephen, or during the reign of Henry II) by Bertram de Bulmer; nuns transferred to Moxby before 1167; Augustinian Canons Regular from 1167; dissolved 1536; granted to the Archbishop of York 1542/3	St Mary Virgin	54°07′04″N 1°06′30″W
Middlesbrough Priory		Benedictine monks priory cell dependent on Whitby; founded c.1120-30, church of St Hilda granted to Whitby by Robert de Brus; dissolved before 1537; granted to Thomas Reve 1563/4; parish church of St Hilda built on or near site of the claustral church 1838-40 (fell into disrepair and demolished 1970s)	Middlesburgh Priory	54°34′59″N 1°14′02″W
Mount Grace Priory		Carthusian monks founded 1398 by Thomas de Holland, Earl of Kent and Duke of Surrey, licence granted by the King; dissolved 1537; granted to Robert Strangeways 1540/1; (NT)	The Priory Church of the Assumption of the Blessed Virgin Mary and Saint Nicholas of Mount Grace in Ingleby ____________________; Mount Grace Charterhouse	54°22′48″N 1°18′36″W
Mount St John Preceptory		Knights Hospitaller founded c.1148, by (?)William Percy II; dissolved 1540; granted to the Archbishop of York 1542/3; current building of Mount St John built on site 1720		54°15′26″N 1°16′30″W
Moxby Priory ^{$}		Benedictine nuns — from Marton founded before 1167 (1158?), land granted by Henry II; Augustinian Canonesses refounded? before 1322; dissolved 1536	St John the Evangelist ____________________; Moxby in Marton Priory	54°05′42″N 1°05′20″W
Newburgh Priory		Augustinian Canons Regular — from Bridlington (East Yorkshire) via Hood founded 1142-3 (1150) by Roger de Mowbray, granted the church to canons from Bridlington temporarily established at Hood 1145; dissolved 1538; granted to Margaret Simpson and her son Anthony Bellasis; mansion named 'Newburgh Priory' built on site, open to the public	St Mary	54°10′53″N 1°10′13″W
Northallerton Whitefriars		Carmelite Friars founded 1356-7, land granted by Edward III and Thomas Hatfield, Bishop of Durham November 1356, royal licence granted 7 February 1354/5; dissolved 10 December 1538; workhouse built 1857; passed to John Dixon 1858, and subsequently passed to William Thrush Jefferson and Cuthbert Wilson and part worked as a gravel pit mid- to late-19th century; in used as a landing strip 1912-1914; workhouse passed to James O'Malley 1939 and converted to an Emergency Medical Hospital, becoming an RAF Hospital 1945 and a civilian hospital (Friarage Hospital) from 1947		54°20′35″N 1°25′49″W
Nun Appleton Priory ^{#}		Cistercian nuns founded c.1150 by Eustace de Merch and his wife Alice de St Quintin: lands granted to the prior and nuns; with regular priests or brethren to 14th century; dissolved 1539; granted to Robert Darknall 1541/2	St Mary and St John the Evangelist	53°51′08″N 1°09′21″W
Nun Monkton Priory ^^{+}		Benedictine nuns founded c.1145 (c.1147, before 1147-53) by William de Arches and his wife Ivetta, confirmed by Henry Murdac, Archbishop of York; dissolved 1536; granted to John, Lord Latimer 1537/8; part of conventual church now in parochial use; site occupied by house built c.1660 for George Payler	The Priory Church of Saint Mary, Nun Monkton	54°00′53″N 1°13′15″W
Nunthorpe Priory		Cistercian nuns (community founded at Hutton c.1162); transferred here c.1167; transferred to Basedale c.1189		54°30′33″N 1°09′51″W
Old Byland Abbey		Savignac monks (community founded at Hood 1138); transferred from Hood 1143; transferred to Stocking 1147		
Penhill Preceptory		Knights Templar founded c.1155 (c.1142) by Roger Mowbray; dissolved 1308-12; and passed to the Knights Hospitallers in a ruinous state 1328; site now within Temple Farm	The Chapel of Our Lady and St Catherine ____________________; Temple Dowskar; Temple Dove Skar	54°17′40″N 1°56′48″W
Ribston Preceptory ^		Knights Templar founded c.1217 by Robert, Lord Ross; dissolved 1308-12; granted to Knights Hospitallers; Knights Hospitaller dissolved 1529; granted to Charles, Duke of Suffolk 1541/2; country house named 'Ribston Hall' built on site 1674, incorporating monastic chapel, in private ownership; partly demolished c.1980	Ribstone Preceptory; Ribstane Preceptory	53°58′43″N 1°24′15″W
Richmond Greyfriars		Franciscan Friars Minor, Conventual (under the Custody of Newcastle) founded 1257-8, attributed to Ralph fitz Randal, Lord of Middleham; dissolved 19 January 1539; granted to John Banaster and William Metcalf; remains now within a public park		54°24′16″N 1°44′17″W
Richmond Priory		purported Benedictine nuns (Note: Richmond — Benedictine nuns: T. Tanner, Notitia Monastica, p. 672, citing Pipe Roll 18 Henry II and R. Gale, Appendix to Reg. Honoris de Richmond, p. 252) founded (during the reign of Henry II(?)); dissolution unknown		
Richmond — St Martin's Priory		Benedictine monks cell dependent on St Mary's York; founded 1100-37, granted to St Mary's by Wymar, dapifer to the Earl of Richmond, confirmed by Stephen, Earl of Brittany (Richmond); dissolved 1539; granted to Edward, Lord Clinton 1550/1; now in private ownership	The Priory Church of Saint Martin, Richmond	54°24′07″N 1°43′43″W
Rievaulx Abbey		Cistercian monks daughter house of Clairvaux; founded 5 March 1132, site granted by Walter Espec, Lord of Helmsley 1131; dissolved 3 December 1538; granted to Thomas, Earl of Rutland 1538/9; (EH)	River Abbey	54°15′27″N 1°07′00″W
Ripon Cathedral Priory ^{+}		monks founded c.654-660 (before 660) by Alchfrid, King of Northumbria; Benedictine? monks c.661; destroyed by fire c.875; refounded; secular canons 10th century? destroyed c.948; secular collegiate refounded before 972; dissolved 1547; refounded as a Royal Free Chapel; episcopal diocesan cathedral founded 1876; extant	The Priory Church of Saint Peter and Saint Wilfrid, Ripon ____________________; Ripon Minster; Rippon Priory	54°08′06″N 1°31′13″W
Rosedale Priory ^		Cistercian nuns founded before 1158 (during the reign of Henry I) by Robert de Pillarton; also given as Benedictine nuns with regular priests or brethren until after 1326; dissolved 1535; remains incorporated into houses	St Mary and St Laurence	54°21′13″N 0°53′16″W
Scalby Greyfriars ^{~}		Franciscan Friars Minor, Conventual (under the Custody of York) (community founded at Scarborough 1239); transferred here 1245; transferred to Scarborough 1267-72;	Hatterboard Greyfriars; Haterberg Greyfriars	54°17′02″N 0°26′22″W (approx)
Scarborough Priory		Cistercian monks alien house: cell dependent on Cîteau; founded before 1189: church granted to Cîteau by Richard I; monks arrived by 1203; dissolved c.1407: church and manor granted to Bridlington (East Yorkshire)	St Mary	54°17′11″N 0°23′37″W
Scarborough Blackfriars		Dominican Friars (under the Visitation of York) founded c.1252: benefactor Isabel de Beaumont; dissolved 1539: surrendered to Richard Ingworth, Bishop of Dover		54°17′05″N 0°23′56″W
Scarborough Greyfriars		Franciscan Friars (under the Custody of York) founded 1239 community and buildings transferred to new site at Hatterboard (Scalby) 1245; transferred from Scalby 1272; dissolved 1539		54°17′06″N 0°23′42″W
Scarborough Whitefriars		Carmelite Friars founded 1319: two houses granted by Edward II for an oratory and residence; dissolved 1539: surrendered to Richard Ingworth, Bishop of Dover		54°17′00″N 0°23′52″W
Scarth Cell (?)		charter by Stephen de Maynell, during the reign of Henry I, for cell dependent on Gisborough; grant apparently never put into effect		
Selby Abbey ^{+}		hermitage of Benedict, monk of Auxerre 1069, purportedly arrived in England intending to found an abbey; Benedictine monks founded c.1069-70, confirmed 1070; dissolved 6 December 1539; granted to Sir Ralph Sadler 1540/1; in parochial use 1618-present	The Abbey Church of Saint Mary and Saint Germain, Selby Our Lord Jesus Christ, St Mary and St German	53°47′03″N 1°04′02″W
Skewkirk Priory		Augustinian Canons Regular cell dependent on Nostell; founded between 1100 and 1135 (before 1144 (Note: Skewkirk Priory — foundation: W. Dugdale, Monasticon Anglicanum, (1468), (ed. by J. Caley &c))) (during the reign of Henry I), chapel of All Saints granted to Nostell by Geoffrey fitz Pain; dissolved 1539	Skokirk Priory; Tockwith Priory	53°58′52″N 1°16′54″W
Snainton Preceptory		Knights Templar		
Staintondale Camera		Knights Hospitaller manor of Stainton Hospital; seized in error as Templar property c.1308; restored to Hospitallers		
Stocking Abbey		Cistercian monks (community founded at Hood 1138); transferred from [Old] Byland 1147: land granted by Roger de Mowbray; transferred to Byland 1177; site possibly located at Oldstead Hall		54°12′57″N 1°11′08″W (possible)
Stonegrave Minster		Saxon monastic site, founded by 757		
Swainby Abbey		Premonstratensian Canons — from Newhouse, Lincolnshire founded before c.1187 by Helewisia, daughter of Ranulph de Glanville, Justiciar of England; transferred to Coverham between 1196 (1197) and 1202 (1212-14); possibly retained as a grange thereafter	The Abbey Church of Saint Mary of Charity, Swainby	54°15′51″N 1°29′14″W
Tadcaster Monastery		Saxon monastery founded 649 by Hieu; apparently monks and nuns c.655	Calcaria Monastery; Kaelcacaestir Monastery; possibly Healaugh (Heiu-laeg)	
Temple Hirst Preceptory		Knights Templar founded 1152 by Ralph Hastings; dissolved 1308-12; granted to Lord Darcy; now incorporated into the buildings of Temple Farm and public house built on site	Temple Hurste	53°42′57″N 1°05′00″W
Thicket Priory		Benedictine nuns founded before 1180 (during the reign of Richard I) by Roger fitz Roger; with regular priests and brethren until after c.1308; dissolved 1539; granted to John Aske 1541/2; demolished 1850	St Mary ____________________; Thicked Priory; Thickett Priory	53°52′58″N 0°56′21″W
Wass, Stanbrook Abbey^{+}		Benedictine nuns founded in Cambrai, Flanders, in 1625 for expatriate English Catholics. Fled to England after French Revolution, 1795. Sojourned in Liverpool, then Warwickshire. Settled in Stanbrook Hall, Callow End, Worcestershire, 1838. Relocated to N. Yorks. 2007	Convent of Our Lady of Consolation; Stanbrook Abbey; Wass	54°12′26″N 1°09′02″W
Wath Priory ^{+}		Benedictine monks alien house: cell dependent on Mont-St-Michel founded before 1156; church of St Mary and manor granted, confirmed by Conan, Duc de Bretagne, Earl of Richmond; abbot's rights disputed, lost trial by combat, renounced claim 1239; church restored 1873, in parochial use as the Parish Church of St Mary		54°11′21″N 1°30′12″W
Westerdale Preceptory		Knights Templar founded before 1203, manor granted by Guy de Bovincounrt with the consent of Hugh de Balliol, confirmed by the King; dissolved 1308-12; Knights Hospitaller camera; later under Beverley		54°26′10″N 0°59′02″W
Whitby Abbey		monks and nuns abbey? granted to St Hilda by King Oswald c.657; Benedictine? nuns refounded? after 664; destroyed in raids by the Danes c.867; Benedictine monks priory founded 1078 (before 1077); built on the site of St Hilda's monastery; abbey before 1109; granted to John, Earl of Warwick 1550/1; (EH)	St Peter St Peter and St Hilda; Streoneschalh	54°29′18″N 0°36′27″W
Whitley Preceptory		Knights Templar founded before 1248; dissolved 1308-12;		53°40′57″N 1°10′08″W (possible)
Wykeham Priory		Cistercian nuns founded c.1153 by Pain fitz Osbert de Wykham; also given as Gilbertine with regular priests or brethren until 14th century destroyed by fire between 1312 and 1377 (during the reign of Edward III); dissolved 1539; granted to Francis Poole 1544; Wykeham Abbey war hospital built on site	St Mary St Mary and St Michael ____________________; Wykham Priory	54°13′26″N 0°31′30″W
Yarm Blackfriars ^^{?}		Dominican Friars (under the Visitation of York) founded before 1266 by Peter de Brus, endowed by Henry III; dissolved 21 December 1538; granted to Miles Wilcock, prior, friars and novices 1539; remains possibly incorporated into house named 'The Friarage' built on site c.1770	The Annunciation (apparently) ____________________; Yarum Blackfriars	54°30′23″N 1°21′08″W
Yedingham Priory		Benedictine nuns founded before 1163 by Helewise de Clere (or by Roger de Clere); with regular priests or brethren until after 1314; dissolved 1539; granted to Robert Holgate, Bishop of Llandaff; thereafter granted to the Archbishop of York	St Mary ____________________; Little Mareis; Little Marcis	54°12′21″N 0°37′41″W
York Austin Friars		Augustinian Canons Regular (under the Limit of York) founded July 1272, Austins in York granted protection by Henry III, property granted by Lord Scrope of Upsall; dissolved 1538; granted to Thomas Rawson		53°57′37″N 1°05′08″W
York Blackfriars, possible earlier site		Dominican Friars (under the Visitation of York) possibly initially housed at Goodramgate after arrival in the city transferred to new site (see immediately below)		53°57′46″N 1°04′44″W (approx)
York Blackfriars		Dominican Friars (under the Visitation of York) possibly transferred from Goodramgate (see immediately above) founded 10 April 1227, chapel of St Mary Magdalene and land granted at the instance of the King; dissolved 1538	St Mary Magdalene	53°57′29″N 1°05′24″W
York — Clementhorpe Priory ^{#}		Benedictine nuns founded c.1130 (1125-33) by Thurstan, Archbishop of York; dissolved 1536; granted to Edward Shipwith 1541-2; remains existing 19th century no longer extant	St Clement's Priory	53°57′08″N 1°04′57″W
York Crutched Friars		Crutched Friars settled in York c.1307 (early in the reign of Edward II), but when the Archbishop of York disallowed their settling in the city they moved on c.1310		53°57′06″N 1°05′14″W
York — Fishergate Priory ^{~}		Benedictine monks priory cell dependent on Whitby; founded after 1087, granted to Whitby by William Rufus; apparently abandoned before 1536(?) and completely demolished	All Saints	53°57′05″N 1°04′36″W (approx)
York Friars of the Sack		Friars of the Sack probably founded c.1260 dissolved before 1312, on the death of the remaining friars; house and site disposed of 1312		53°57′38″N 1°05′13″W
York Greyfriars, earlier site		Franciscan Friars Minor, Conventual (under the Custody of York) probably founded c.1230, endowments provided by Henry III January 1236 and 1237 for building transferred to new site (see immediately below) c.1243		
York Greyfriars		Franciscan Friars Minor, Conventual (under the Custody of York) (community founded at earlier site (see immediately above) c.1230) transferred here c.1243; dissolved 27 November 1538; granted to Leonard Beckwith 1542/3		53°57′19″N 1°04′52″W
York — Holy Trinity Priory		secular canons founded before 1069 (before 1066); partly destroyed and abandoned in siege of York by the Danes 1069; Benedictine monks alien house: dependent on Marmoutier; founded 1089 by Ralph Paynell, who restored the church; became denizen: independent 1426; dissolved 11 December 1538; granted to Leonard Beckwith 1542/3; remains incorporated into present parish church	The Priory Church of The Holy Trinity, Micklegate, York ____________________; Christ Church	53°57′22″N 1°05′19″W
York — St Andrew's Priory		Gilbertine Canons founded c.1200 by Hugh Murdac, Archdeacon of Cleveland; dissolved 1538; granted to John Bellow and John Broxholm 1545/6	St Andrew	53°57′09″N 1°04′39″W
York Whitefriars, Bootham		Carmelite Friars founded 1253; transferred to new site at the Stonebow (see immediately below) 1295		53°57′58″N 1°05′00″W
York Whitefriars, the Stonebow		Carmelite Friars (community founded at Bootham (see immediately above) 1253); transferred here 1295; dissolved 1538; granted to Ambrose Becwith 1543/4		53°57′31″N 1°04′35″W
York — St Anne's Monastic House *		Celtic Orthodox church; founded March 1995; extant	Mother of Mary, the Mother of God	53°58′04″N 1°04′37″W
York — St Mary's Abbey		Benedictine monks (community founded at St Olave's before 1086); transferred here 1088-9; dissolved 26 November 1539	The Abbey Church of Saint Mary, York	53°57′43″N 1°05′18″W
York — St Olave's Abbey		Secular minster — from Lastingham founded before 1055, built by Earl Siward; Benedictine monks refounded before 1086; transferred to new site 1088-9, becoming St Mary's Abbey	St Olave's Minster at Galmanho	53°57′44″N 1°05′21″W
York Monastery, earlier site		Culdees? founded c.937? transferred to new site (see immediately below) after 1086	St Peter	
York Monastery		Culdees? (community founded at earlier site (see immediately above) c.937?); transferred here after 1086; rebuilt by William Rufus; became St Leonard's Hospital founded before 1135, under Augustinian rule; dissolved 1540; granted to Robert, Lord Dudley; later called 'the Mint Yard' 1563-4	St Peter ____________________; St Peter's Hospital; St Leoonard's Hospital	53°57′40″N 1°05′10″W
York Cathedral ^{+}		Secular (collegiate) founded 625; episcopal diocesan cathedral founded 627; extant destroyed 633; Culdees? 664; Benedictine? monks founded c.972; Secular (collegiate) refounded after 992;	The Cathedral and Metropolitical Church of Saint Peter in York ____________________; York Minster	53°57′44″N 1°04′56″W

== See also ==
- List of monastic houses in England
