= Westerdale Preceptory =

Priory in Westerdale, North Yorkshire, England

Coordinates: 54.4440°N 0.9798°W

Westerdale Preceptory was a priory in Westerdale, North Yorkshire, England. The land was donated to the Knights Templar by Guido de Bovingcourt in 1203, and was one of ten preceptories owned by the Knights Templar in Yorkshire (the others being Copmanthorpe, Cowton, Faxfleet, Foulbridge, Hirst, Newsam, Penhill, Ribston and Wetherby). The Templars worked the land and farmed at Westerdale until their suppression for heresy (among other things) in 1307–1308.

Between 1312 and 1538, the preceptory was worked by the Knights Hospitaller under the command of the preceptory at Beverley. In 1538, the preceptory was dissolved and there are no extant remains of the site.
