= List of monastic houses in the East Riding of Yorkshire =

Locations of monastic houses in the East Riding of Yorkshire
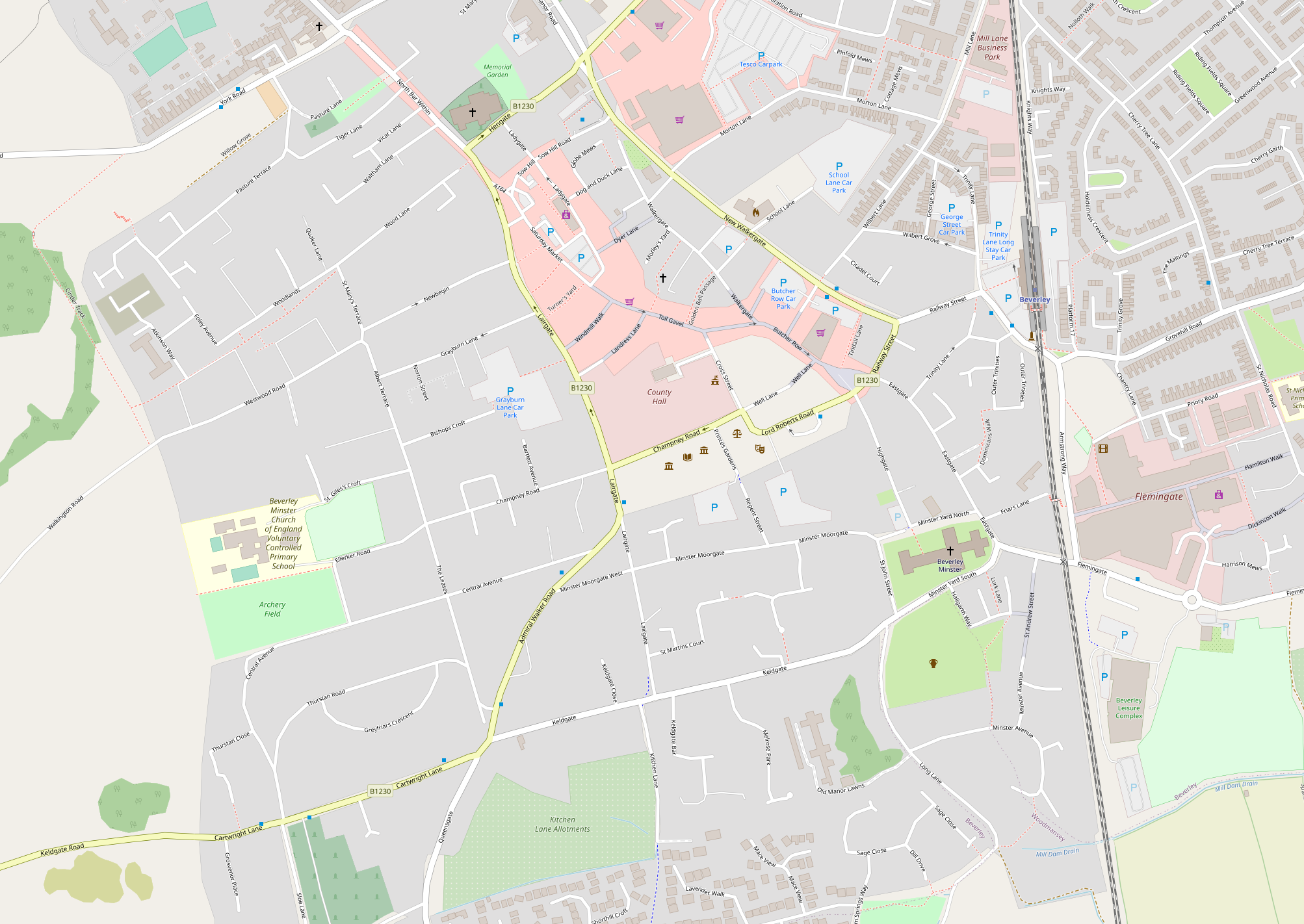
Locations of monastic houses in Beverley
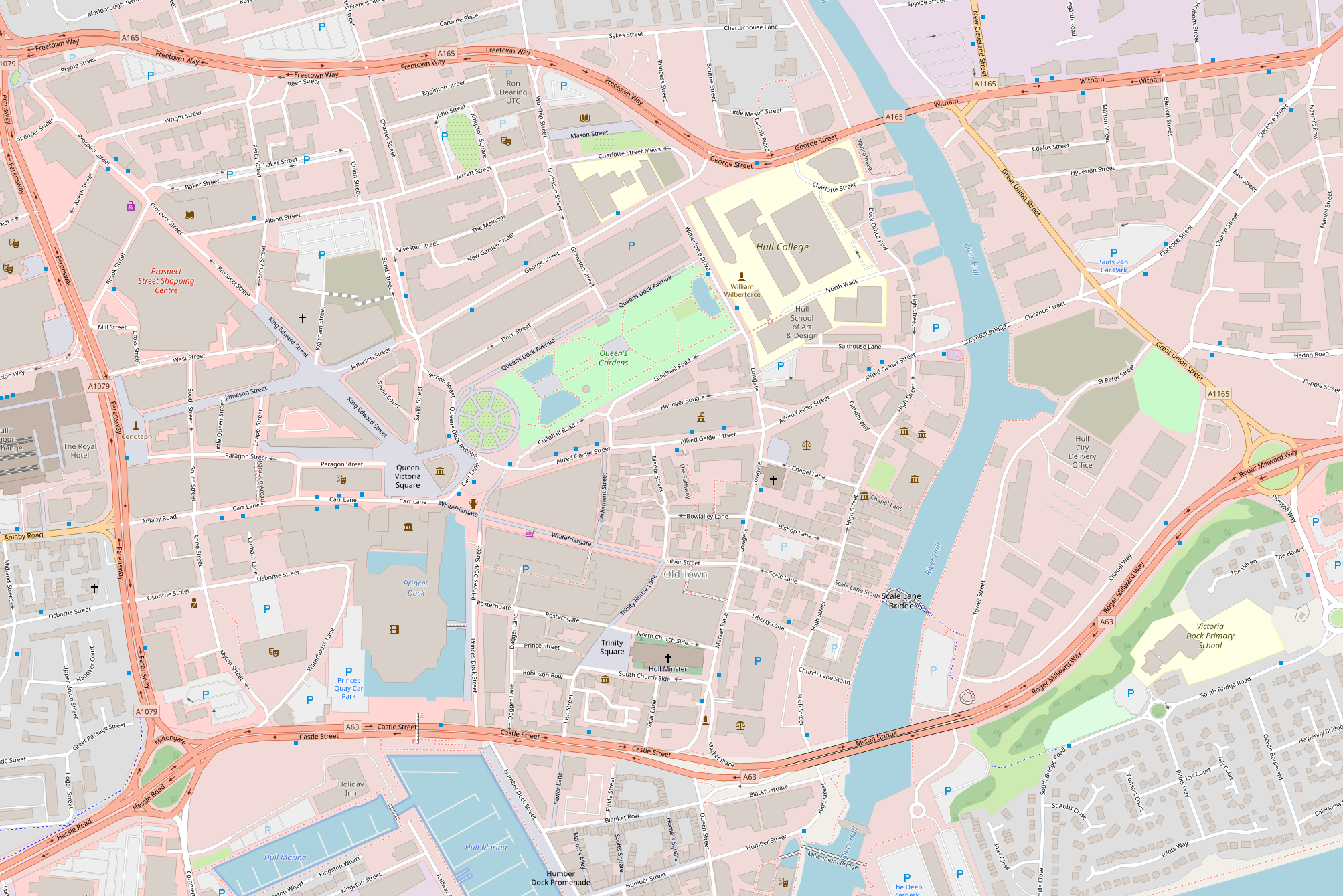
Locations of monastic houses in Kingston upon Hull

The following is a list of the monastic houses in the East Riding of Yorkshire, England.

Alien houses are included, as are smaller establishments such as cells and notable monastic granges (particularly those with resident monks), and also camerae of the military orders of monks (Knights Templar and Knights Hospitaller). Monastic hospitals are included where they had the status or function of an abbey, priory, or preceptor/commandery.

Abbreviations and key

Status of remains
Symbol	Status
None	Ruins
*	Current monastic function
^{+}	Current non-monastic ecclesiastic function (including remains incorporated into later structure)
^	Current non-ecclesiastic function (including remains incorporated into later structure) or redundant intact structure
^{$}	Remains limited to earthworks etc.
^{#}	No identifiable trace of the monastic foundation remains
^{~}	Exact site of monastic foundation unknown
^{≈}	Identification ambiguous or confused

Locations with names in italics indicate possible duplication (misidentification with another location) or non-existent foundations (either erroneous reference or proposed foundation never implemented) or ecclesiastical establishments with a monastic name but lacking actual monastic connection.

Trusteeship
EH	English Heritage
LT	Landmark Trust
NT	National Trust

Foundation	Image	Communities and provenance	Formal name or dedication and alternative names	References and location
Beverley Minster ^{+}		Benedictine? monks and nuns, secular collegiate founded c.700 by John, Archbishop of York; destroyed in raids by the Danes c.867 secular (collegiate) refounded c.934; dissolved 1547; granted to Michael Stanhope and John Bellew 1548/9	The Parish Church of Saint John and Saint Martin, Beverley	53°50′21″N 0°25′29″W
Beverley Blackfriars		Dominican Friars (under the Visitation of York) founded 1267 (or before 1240), purportedly by Stephen Goldsmith, but claimed by the town and the Crown; dissolved 1539; granted to John Pope and Antony Foster 1544/5		53°50′24″N 0°25′23″W
Beverley Greyfriars, earlier site		Franciscan Friars Minor, Conventual (under the Custody of York) initially founded before 1267 possibly by John de Hightmede; transferred to new site (see immediately below) 1297		
Beverley Greyfriars		Franciscan Friars Minor, Conventual (under the Custody of York) (community founded at earlier site (see immediately above) before 1267); transferred here 1297 by William Liketon and Henry Weighton; dissolved 1539; granted to Thomas Culpeper 1541/2		53°50′26″N 0°26′11″W
Beverley Preceptory		Knights Hospitaller founded c.1201, manor of the Holy Trinity and other endowments granted by Sybilla de Valoniis; dissolved 1540; granted to William Berkeley 1544/5		53°50′33″N 0°25′22″W
Bridlington Priory ^{+}		Augustinian Canons Regular founded before 1113–4 by Walter de Gant; dissolved 1537; conventual church now in parochial use	The Priory Church of Saint Mary the Virgin, Bridlington ____________________; Burlington Priory	54°05′40″N 0°12′06″W
Birstall Priory		Benedictine monks alien house: dependent on Aumale founded after 1115, endowments granted by Stephen, Count of Albemarle; dissolved 1395, sold to Kirkstall; submerged under the Humber Estuary after 1540	Birstall Priory	53°38′28″N 0°02′28″E (approx)
Cottingham Priory		Augustinian Canons Regular — (?)Arroasian founded 1322 by Thomas Wake, Lord of Liddell, licensed 1320; transferred to Haltemprice 1325–6		53°47′04″N 0°24′29″W
Ellerton Priory (Spalding Moor) ^{$}		Gilbertine Canons priory and hospital founded before c.1209 (1212) by William Fitz Peter; dissolved 18 December 1538; granted to John Aske 1541/2	St Mary ____________________; Elreton on the Derwent Priory; Ellerton Priory	53°51′02″N 0°56′09″W
Faxfleet Preceptory		Knights Templar founded 1185 (before 1220(?)); dissolved 1308–12; site now occupied by a fortified manor house		53°42′43″N 0°41′53″W
Haltemprice Priory		Augustinian Canons Regular — (?)Arroasian (community founded at Cottingham 1322) transferred here 1325–6 (1327); church and buildings built and occupied by Arroasian canons from Bourne, Lincolnshire by January 1326; Augustinian Canons Regular independent from before 1355 transferred here 1327; dissolved 12 August 1536 (1536–7); granted to Thomas Culpeper 1540/1	St Mary and the Holy Cross	53°45′53″N 0°25′15″W
Hemingbrough Minster		church held by Benedictine monks of Durham Cathedral; licence obtained 1426 to found a secular college; dissolved 1547	St Mary ____________________; Hemingburgh Minster	
Howden Minster		secular canons founded 1267 by Robert, Bishop of Durham; dissolved 1550, collegiate	The Collegiate and Minster Church of Saint Peter and Saint Paul, Howden	53°44′43″N 0°52′02″W
Kingston upon Hull Austin Friars		Augustinian Friars (under the Limit of York) founded before 1303 (1304); dissolved 1539; extant remains demolished c.1796; remains incorporated into the Tiger Inn; some remains incorporated into Guildhall, demolished 1806		53°44′25″N 0°19′57″W
Kingston upon Hull Blackfriars(?)		Dominican Friars granted to John Broxholme 1544/5 possible error — confusion for Lincoln Blackfriars? (see entry under List of monastic houses in Lincolnshire)		
Kingston upon Hull Greyfriars		secular college founded by Edward I; Franciscan Friars Minor, Conventual (under the Custody of York(?)) founded after 1307(?); dissolved before 1365; friars removed to found a Franciscan nunnery, which never transpired; Carthusian Priory established 1377		53°44′55″N 0°20′02″W
Kingston upon Hull Whitefriars, earlier site		Carmelite Friars founded 1290–3 transferred to new site (see immediately below) 1307		
Kingston upon Hull Whitefriars		Carmelite Friars (community founded at earlier site (see immediately above) 1290–3); transferred here 1307 when the King granted a new site in exchange for the old; dissolved 1539; granted to John Henneage 1540/1	Kingston Whitefriars	53°44′34″N 0°20′11″W
Kingston upon Hull Priory		previously Fransciscan Friary licence granted to Sir William de la Pole to found a hospital, and later an abbey for Franciscan nuns — (never established); Carthusian monks founded 1377; dissolved 1539	St Mary Virgin, St Michael and All Angels, and St Thomas Martyr	53°44′55″N 0°20′02″W
Kirkham Priory	Historical county location. See entry under List of monastic houses in North Yorkshire			
Meaux Abbey		Cistercian monks daughter house of Fountains, Yorkshire; founded 1150 by William of Blois, 'le Gros', Count of Albemarle and Lord of Holderness, site chosen by Adam, monk of Fountains; community arrived 1 January 1151; dissolved 11 December 1539; granted to John, Earl of Warwick 1549/50; site now occupied by Crown Farm, in private ownership	Melsa Abbey	53°50′23″N 0°20′30″W
North Ferriby Priory ^{#}		purported Knights Templar preceptory appears not to have existed (Note: North Ferriby Knights Templar - Knowles & Hadcock (1971) Medieval Religious Houses: England and Wales p.197); Augustinian Canons Regular — Order of the Temple of St John of Jerusalem founded c.1140(?) by Eustace fitz John; dissolved 1536–7; granted to Thomas Culpeper c.1540	The Priory Church of St Marie, North Ferriby ____________________; North Ferriby Preceptory (dubious); North Ferry Priory	53°43′06″N 0°30′21″W
Nunburnholme Priory		Benedictine nuns founded possibly before 1170 or before 1188 (during the reign of Henry II) by the ancestors of Roger de Merlay, Lord of the Barony of Morpeth, probably William de Merlay or Roger I de Merlay; with regular priests or brethren 12th century until sometime after 1318; dissolved 1536; granted to Robert Tyrwhit	The Priory Church of Saint Mary, Nunburnholme ____________________; Brunnum Priory	53°55′29″N 0°42′14″W
Nunkeeling Priory		Benedictine nuns founded 1152 by Agnes de Arches (Agnes de Catfoss); with regular priests or brethren 12th century until sometime after 1318; sometimes given as Cistercian nuns dissolved 1539; granted to Richard Gresham 1540/1; remains incorporated into church of St Mary Magdalene and St Helena built 1810, now ruined	The Priory Church of Saint Mary Magdalene, Keeling ____________________; Nonnekelyng Priory; Nun Kelynge Priory	53°56′05″N 0°15′24″W
Ottringham Priory		Cistercian residential chantry dependent on Meaux Abbey; monks from Meaux resided at Ottringham church 1293 to 1323; possibly St Wilfrid's Church		53°42′03″N 0°04′52″W
Snaith Priory ^{+}		Benedictine monks founded after 1101; chapel of St Lawrence granted to Selby by Gerard, Archbishop of York; resident monks from 1310; dissolved 1539	St Lawrence	53°41′31″N 1°01′51″W
Swine Priory ^{+}		Cistercian nuns and Premonstratensian(?) canons double house founded before 1153 by Robert de Verli, built c.1180, confirmed by Hugh de Puiset (Pudsey); Premonstratensian(?) replaced by Trinitarian(?) between 1287 and 1290; Cistercian nuns became ordinary nunnery after 1335; dissolved 9 September 1539; granted to Sir Richard Gresham c.1540; conventual church now in parochial use	St Mary ____________________; Swinhey Priory	53°48′23″N 0°16′45″W
Thicket Priory	Historical county location. See entry under List of monastic houses in North Yorkshire			
Warter Priory		Augustinian Canons Regular — Arroasian alien house: daughter house of Arrouaise; abbey founded 1132 by Jeffery (Geoffrey) Fitz Pain Trusbut; became denizen: independent from 1162; priory before 1181–92 to dissolution; dissolved 1536; granted to Thomas, Earl of Rutland c.1540 conventual church remained in parochial use until demolished 1864; parochial church of St James built on site	St James	53°56′34″N 0°40′34″W
Watton Priory		Benedictine? nuns founded c.686; probably destroyed in raids by the Danes 9th century; Gilbertine Canons and nuns double monastery founded 1150; dissolved 1539; granted to John, Earl of Warwick; house named 'Watton Abbey' built on site, in private ownership	Walton Priory	53°56′05″N 0°26′34″W
Wilberfoss Priory		Benedictine nuns founded c.1154 (before 1153) by Alan de Cotton, who granted land and property, and Jordan fitz Gilbert, who granted church etc. (which was confirmed by Henry, Archbishop of York); dissolved 1539; granted to George Gale c.1543; current parish church possibly the nave of the conventual church	The Priory Church of the Blessed Virgin Mary, Wilberfoss ____________________; Wilburfosse Priory	53°57′00″N 0°53′06″W
Withernsea Priory		Benedictine monks alien house: cell dependent on Aumale; founded c.1115, church, etc. granted by Stephen, Count of Albemarle; destroyed by the sea		53°43′20″N 0°01′46″E
Yedingham Priory	Historical county location. See entry under List of monastic houses in North Yorkshire			

== See also ==
- List of monastic houses in England
