= List of monastic houses in West Yorkshire =

Locations of monastic houses in West Yorkshire

The following is a list of the monastic houses in West Yorkshire, England.

Alien houses are included, as are smaller establishments such as cells and notable monastic granges (particularly those with resident monks), and also camerae of the military orders of monks (Knights Templar and Knights Hospitaller). Monastic hospitals are included where they had the status or function of an abbey, priory, or preceptor/commandery.

Abbreviations and key

Status of remains
Symbol	Status
None	Ruins
*	Current monastic function
^{+}	Current non-monastic ecclesiastic function (including remains incorporated into later structure)
^	Current non-ecclesiastic function (including remains incorporated into later structure) or redundant intact structure
^{$}	Remains limited to earthworks etc.
^{#}	No identifiable trace of the monastic foundation remains
^{~}	Exact site of monastic foundation unknown
^{≈}	Identification ambiguous or confused

Locations with names in italics indicate possible duplication (misidentification with another location) or non-existent foundations (either erroneous reference or proposed foundation never implemented) or ecclesiastical establishments with a monastic name but lacking actual monastic connection.

Trusteeship
EH	English Heritage
LT	Landmark Trust
NT	National Trust

== Alphabetic listing ==
Foundation	Image	Communities and provenance	Formal name or dedication and alternative names	References & location
Arthington Priory		Cluniac nuns founded 1154-5 by Peter de Ardington; with regular priests or brethren 1155 to after 1318; dissolved 1539; granted to Thomas Cranmer, Archbishop of Canterbury 1542/3		53°54′06″N 1°33′43″W
Barwick-in-Elmete Monastery ^{$?}		Saxon monastery founded before c.730 by Abbot Thrydwulf(?) (before 636); ?destroyed 9th century; Saxon remains in church		53°50′38″N 1°23′29″W (traditional)
Collingham Monastery		Saxon monastery founded by Eanfled, daughter of King Edwin; destroyed c.875; identified with Ingetlingum (before 1873 considered to be Gilling)	Ingetlingum	53°54′31″N 1°24′28″W
Esholt Priory ^{#}		Cistercian nuns founded 12th century; with regular priests or brethren to after 1318; dissolved 1539; site now occupied by house named 'Esholt Hall'	Esseholt Priory	53°51′11″N 1°42′53″W
Headley Priory		Benedictine monks alien house: dependent on Marmoutier founded before 1125, benefacted by Ypolitus de Bram, his charter dated 1125; dissolved 1414; granted to Holy Trinity, York	St Mary	53°51′48″N 1°19′57″W
Kirklees Priory		Cistercian nuns founded before 1138(?), grant by Reyner (Reynerus) Flandrensis (Flandersis), confirmed by his lord William de Warenne; dissolved November 1539; granted to John Tasburgh and Nicholas Savill 1544/5	The Blessed Virgin Mary and St James ____________________; Kirkleghes Priory	53°41′42″N 1°44′12″W
Kirkstall Abbey		hermit community (community founded at Barnoldswick 19 May 1147); Cistercian monks — from Fountains (North Yorkshire) via Barnoldswick (Lancashire) founded 20 May 1152: land granted to community from Barnoldswick by William of Poictou, at the instance of their founder Henry de Lacy; some of the hermits joined the new foundation; dissolved 22 November 1540; now in ownership of Leeds Corporation, public access to church exterior and monastic buildings		53°49′15″N 1°36′23″W
Newland Preceptory		Knights Hospitaller founded after 1199, manor granted by John; chapel rebuilt 1519; dissolved 1540; granted to Francis Jobson and Andrew Dudley 1546/7; chapel demolished c.1860; possible remains of the preceptory chapel incorporated into 16th/17th century fabric in a barn		53°41′49″N 1°26′50″W
Nostell Priory, earlier site		Augustinian Canons Regular founded c.1114 by Robert de Lacy; transferred to new site (see immediately below) before 1120		
Nostell Priory ^{#}		Augustinian Canons Regular (community founded at earlier site (see immediately above) c.1114); transferred here before 1120 (possibly not occupied until 1122); dissolved 1539 (1540); granted to Thomas Leigh 1539/40; site now occupied by a mansion named 'Nostell Priory'	The Priory Church of Saint Oswald, Nostell	53°39′19″N 1°23′00″W
Pontefract Blackfriars ^{#}		Dominican Friars (under the Visitation of York) founded 1256 by Edmund de Lacy, Earl of Lincoln (built before 1266 by Simon Pyper); dissolved 26 November 1538; granted to William Clifford and Michael Wildbore 1544/5	St Richard	53°41′23″N 1°18′36″W
Pontefract Greyfriars (?)		alleged Franciscan Friars (Note: Pontefract Greyfriars Leland, Itinerary, iv, p.13); disputed (Note: Pontefract Greyfriars Tanner, Notitia Monastica, p.692); probably mistaken for Dominican Friars		
Pontefract Priory		Cluniac monks alien house: dependent on La Charité founded c.1090 by Robert de Lacy; became denizen: independent from 1393; dissolved 1539; granted to William, Lord Talbot 1553	The Priory Church of Saint John of Pontefract	53°41′52″N 1°18′02″W
Pontefract Whitefriars (?)		alleged college of Carmelite Friars (Note: Pontefract Whitefriars Leland, Itinerary, i, p.39 states Edmund Lacy built college) founded before 1257 (1258 (Note: Pontefract Whitefriars actual date of death of the Earl of Lincoln was 1258)) by Edmund Lacy (Earl of Lincoln?) (Note: Pontefract Whitefriars Tanner, Notitia Monastica, and Dugdale, Monasticon Anglicanum state Edmund Lacy was the Earl of Lincoln, who died 1257 (sic.)); disputed (Note: Pontefract Whitefriars T. M. Fallow rejected the alleged foundation)		
Syningthwaite Priory ^{$}		Cistercian nuns founded c.1160 by Bertram Haget; apparently with brethren from c.1169 (papal bull of Alexander III 1172), until 14th century(?); dissolved 3 August 1535; granted to John, Earl of Warwick 1550/1; remains incorporated into Priory Farmhouse, built on site	St Mary ____________________; Sinningthwaite Priory	53°55′56″N 1°17′55″W
Temple Newsam Preceptory ^{#}		Knights Templar founded before 1181 (possibly initially located at Newbond), granted by William de Villiers; dissolved 1308–12;		
Wetherby Preceptory		member of Ribstone; Knights Templar founded after 1240, apparently forming a single preceptory with Ribstone; dissolved 1308–12; Knights Hospitaller camera		53°55′36″N 1°23′32″W (traditional)
Woodkirk Priory		Augustinian Canons Regular cell, dependent on Nostell; founded 1138-47 (before 1135) by William de Warenne and others, who granted chapel of St Mary to Nostell; dissolved 1539 (1540); granted to George Talbot and Robert Savill	Widkirk Priory	53°43′17″N 1°35′22″W

== See also ==
- List of monastic houses in England
- List of monastic houses in Wales
- List of monastic houses in Scotland
- List of monastic houses in Ireland
