= Keldholme Priory election dispute =

14th-century monastic election

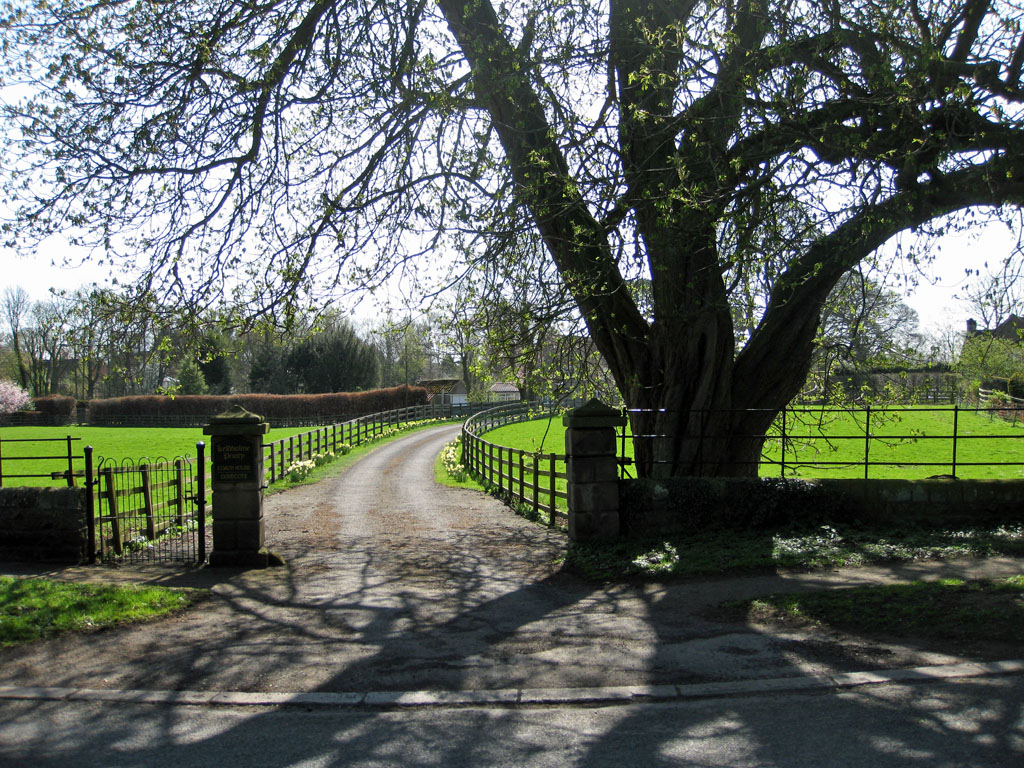
Site of Keldholme Priory in 2011

The Keldholme Priory election dispute occurred in Yorkshire, England, in 1308. After a series of resignations by its prioresses, the establishment was in a state of turmoil, and the Archbishop of York, William Greenfield, appointed one of the nuns to lead the house. His candidate, Emma de Ebor' (Emma of York), was deemed unacceptable by many nuns, who undermined her from the start to the extent that she resigned three months later. The archbishop, forced to find another candidate, claimed that he was unable to do so from within the priory and appointed Joan de Pykering from nearby Rosedale Priory. It is likely that Keldholme saw de Pykering as an intruder, and it seems to have reacted against her in much the same way as to her predecessor.

In response, the archbishop attempted to quash the nuns' rebelliousness. Individuals identified by him and his officials were exiled to surrounding priories, while at one point Keldholme itself was placed under interdict and the nuns threatened with excommunication. The convent was not deterred: the campaign against de Pykering continued until eventually Greenfield allowed the prioress to resign and the nuns to elect one of their number again. They re-elected Emma de Stapleton, who had previously resigned the position in 1301, but she also seems to have become unpopular with the nuns. Archbishop Greenfield died in 1315, and within two months, de Stapleton had also resigned, supposedly because of ill health and age. The nuns of Keldholme re-elected Emma de Ebor', the election dispute evaporated and little more was heard of the priory until its dissolution in 1536.

== Background ==
St Mary of Keldholme Priory, founded during the reign of King Henry I, was a small Cistercian nunnery situated a couple of miles east of Kirkbymoorside, Yorkshire. Few of the prioresses names have been recorded, and the Victoria County History (VCH) comments that "there is remarkably little known of the history of the house" until the 14th century, when a disputed election for a prioress led to some years of turmoil.

Religious houses in Yorkshire were prone to internal disorder in the early 14th century. (Note: Eileen Power has speculated that religious houses in the north of England generally were more prone to disorder on account of tending to be small, poor and close to the border with Scotland and the concomitant dangers associated with intermittent border warfare: "life was not easy for nuns who might at any moment have to flee before a raid and whose lands were constantly being ravaged; they grew more and more miserably poor and as usual poverty seemed to go hand in hand with laxity. Moreover the conditions of life set its stamp upon the character of the ladies".) This was the second disputed election for a Yorkshire prioress in 15 years; in 1290, John le Romeyn, Greenfield's predecessor, had appointed Josiana de Anlaby Prioress of Swine Priory and a similar crisis of leadership had occurred. Keldholme itself had suffered two recent resignations of its Prioresses in 1294 and 1301, by Beatrice of Grendale and Emma de Stapleton respectively. (Note: Valerie Spear has identified a general malaise in discipline across the Diocese of York between 1308 and 1325, which she links to not just ineffectual leadership from prioresses, but the perennial border conflict that took place in this period. Janet Burton similarly notes the high turnover of prioresses Keldholme had during much the same period: over approximately a 20-year period, the priory faced five elections, and, she says, "on each occasion the vacancy was caused by a resignation, voluntary or enforced".) The priory's reputation was further damaged by suspicions that the Sheriff of Cleveland, Geoffrey of Eston, was engaging in sexual activities with nuns in both Keldholme and Arden priories.

De Stapleton's 1301 resignation was probably directly related to Archbishop Melton's episcopal visitation of the same year, in the course of which he discovered malpractice. As a result, the priory was without a prioress for the following seven years. On 17 April 1308, the Archbishop of York, William Greenfield, issued an official inquiry regarding the current vacancy. (Note: It can be deduced that whoever the previous prioress had been, she must have died, rather than have resigned, as a previous prioress of Keldholme, Emma de Stapleton, had done in 1301. This is because a resignation would have already had to go through the archbishop and be accepted by him, whereas a prioress's death initiated local machinery only. Janet Burton has suggested that not only do "the York registers reveal that the late 13th and the early 14th centuries saw many disputed elections in Yorkshire nunneries, but also what appears to be an increased inclination on the part of the archbishops of York to intervene in nunnery affairs, intervention that was not always sought or welcomed".) This commission was required to establish three things: when the vacancy had begun, how long Keldholme had lacked the necessary leadership, and whether this had lasted more than six months. The final criterion was significant because a vacancy of over six months allowed the archbishop to bypass the nuns' right to appoint their own prioress, and install a candidate of his choosing. The commission was headed by two local rectors, who were instructed that, if it was discovered that the nuns' right to elect a prioress had not lapsed they were to do so within one month. The rectors' task did not take long, and although they were equivocal regarding the precise length of the vacancy, they reported that the appointment was now the archbishop's responsibility on account of the lapse of time. Three days later, the Archbishop—probably on the recommendation of his commission—appointed Emma de Ebor' (Note: Emma of York: Ebor' being a shortened version of Eboracum (York in Latin).) as prioress, believing her the best-qualified candidate from among the nuns.

== Disputed elections ==
=== Pykering appointed ===
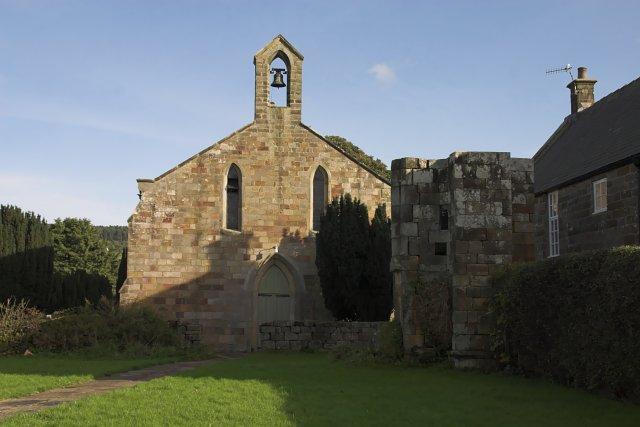
Remains of Joan de Pykering's Rosedale Priory in 2008, from where she came in 1308 and to where she returned in 1309

Much of what is known of subsequent events at Keldholme comes from a letter written by the Archbishop to the Archdeacon of Cleveland, now extant in the Archiepiscopal Registers. Emma de Ebor' seems to have been unpopular with the convent from the moment of her election, and the Archdeacon was instructed to investigate certain Keldholme nuns. These were Beatrix de Roston, Mary de Holm, Isabella de Langetoft, Anabilla de Lokton, Orphania de Nueton, and Joan de Roseles, who, among others—including lay people—refused obedience to Emma and were accused of undermining her. All were subsequently adjudged guilty of insubordination to their prioress. Because this represented at least half the convent, Emma de Ebor' resigned (Note: Possibly a much larger majority if, as Burton suggests, the priory contained only eight or nine nuns around this time.) on 30 July the same year. Greenfield was forced to accept her cession as prioress and on 5 August announced that, finding no suitable candidate from within Keldholme itself, he had chosen Joan de Pykering from the nearby (Note: Rosedale was only a little over seven miles from Keldholme, so Pykering was local to both.) Benedictine Rosedale Priory. She, says the VCH, "from the testimony of trustworthy persons, was deemed competent" and of "good reputation"; it is probable that she had indicated willingness to put Keldholme in order at Greenfield's command. Janet Burton emphasises that this was an appointment rather than an election, and notes that the imposition of an outsider meant that the Archbishop had revoked their privilege to elect their own head. The same nuns who had opposed de Stapleton's regime were "equally resistant" to that of Pykering's. It is likely, Burton suggests, that a lack of calibre among Keldholme's nuns accounted for the long interregnum between prioresses in 1308 and 1309.

The Archdeacon placed de Pykering in corporeal possession of the priory, and rebuked those nuns who had opposed her predecessor. (Note: Burton names these individuals as Joan de Stuteville, Hawise of Scarborough, Orphania de Neuton, Isabelle of Langtoft and Mary of Holme.) They were to accept the new prioress without question immediately, he said, as were "certain laymen who had prevented her from exercising her office". The latter numbered nine in all, five of whom were from Kirkbymoorside.

The Archdeacon's efforts to impose an episcopal peace came to nothing. In the words of the medievalist Eileen Power, "pandemonium reigned" at Keldholme, and the Archbishop was forced to visit officially. Writing to the Sheriff of Cleveland on 3 September, Greenfield wrote that Sisters de Holm, de Langetoft, de Lokton and de Roseles were irredeemable troublemakers and that they were to be separated and transferred to disparate abbeys for penance. (Note: This was a common method archbishops used to deal with recalcitrant nuns, although, notes Burton, the tactic was "sometimes resisted by the host nunnery". Within a few weeks the four were sent to Swine, Handale, Wallingwells and Nun Appleton Priories respectively, although there is some doubt as to whether de Holme ever left Keldholme. The precise nature of their penances remains unknown, but often seem to have required nuns "to be last in quire, cloister, refectory and dormitory". Infractions could also result in severe punishment. In 1287, Maud of Tiverton—also of Keldholme Priory—apostated, and among the penances meted out to her by Archbishop Melton were that she receive regular beatings from her prioress.) Three others—including the ex-prioress, Emma de Stapleton—appear to have also left Keldholme, but without permission; they were summoned before the Archbishop. (Note: Mary's accomplices on this occasion were Matila Bigod and Alice of Pickering.)

Relations between the priory and the Archbishop were by now, says the historian Martin Heale, "acrimonious", and the removal of individual nuns from the arena had done nothing to improve them. On February 1309, Greenfield wrote to Keldholme's sub-prioress and the convent. He insisted that they immediately write to Lady Joan Wake, Lady of Liddell,—the priory's patron—informing her that they willingly accepted de Pykering to head their house. They were also to emphasise their obedience and support for Joan, and request Wake to restore Pykering to possession of the temporalities of the priory as soon as possible. Seen by the nuns as an "imported ... interloper", Power described Joan at this time as, "a luckless exile in the tents of Kedar". (Note: The phrase is from Psalm 120:5, and was popularised in the Early Middle Ages by Bernard of Clairvaux.) Four days later the Archbishop instigated a commission to investigate the offences he had uncovered, and placed the priory under interdict until Pykering was accepted as prioress.

=== Resignations ===
The Archbishop's efforts came to nothing, says Burton, and Greenfield was forced to concede that Pykering was not the best choice for the priory. On the 14th, Greenfield instructed the commission to discuss de Pykering's future with her. They were to establish whether she wished to resign; if she did, the sub-prioress and convent were instructed to hold an election to choose a new superior. De Pykering resigned as prioress of Keldholme the same month and returned to Rosedale; (Note: Pykering later became Prioress of Rosedale, succeeding Mary de Ros in 1311.) her opponents in Keldholme, says Power, "were triumphant". On 7 March 1309 they elected one of their own, Emma de Stapleton, back into the position she had held eight years' previously; De Stapleton may have been an acceptable choice for Greenfield also, as he subsequently granted permission for her niece to board within the priory. Greenfield was able to get some revenge on those who had obstructed his plans. One of the laymen of the priory, one Nicholas de Rippinghall—one of those responsible for previously fomenting opposition to Emma de Ebor'—received a heavy penance from Greenfield. For the disruption he had caused at Keldholme, declared Greenfield—

On the second Sunday in Lent he was to go bareheaded to the cathedral church of York, clad in a tunic only, holding a taper of a pound weight and after the procession was to go before the high altar, and humbly offer the lighted taper and receive a discipline there from the archbishop's penitentiary. The following Sunday he was to do the same in Kirkby Moorside Church and, after the Gospel, offer the taper and receive a discipline there from the vicar or parish clerk, and on the next two Sundays he was to do much the same in the conventual church of Keldholme.

— The Victoria County History

Other nuns were removed by Greenfield to Esholt and Nunkeeling priories at around the time of de Stapleton's election, but this was probably for reasons of immorality rather than any connection to the political dispute.

=== Acrimony in the convent ===
The election of de Stapleton did not bring the affair to a close. She was continually insulted and disobeyed, particularly by Emma de Ebor' and Mary de Holme. The former, says Power, "could not forget that she had once been prioress" at Keldholme, and the latter (Note: Whom Power describes flatly as a "thoroughly bad character", and who, Power notes, was still getting into trouble after Greenfield's death: his successor disciplined her for wantoness with a chaplain: she was sentenced to do penance "for the vice of incontinence committed by her with Sir William Lyly, chaplain".)—who had either returned from Swine or, perhaps, had disobeyed the Archbishop and never left Keldholme—forced Greenfield to take further action. He instructed the priory's custos, Richard del Clay, vicar of Lastingham, to make his way to Keldholme and there summon both de Holme and de Ebor' on the charge of being—in the Archbishop's words—"daughters of perdition". Del Clay was to denounce the two nuns—"in the mother tongue"—for their disobedience before the collected convent. Further, instructed Greenfield, "they were not to meddle with any internal or external business of the house in any way, or to go outside of the enclosure of the monastery, or to say anything against the prioress, on pain of expulsion and of the greater excommunication".

Archbishop Greenfield died in December 1315. This presented the discontented nuns with an opportunity to change prioresses again. Accordingly, Emma de Stapleton resigned in February the next year—in her words, "oppressed by age" and sickness—and Emma de Ebor' was re-elected in her place. For the second time in Keldhome's recent history de Ebor' succeeded de Stapleton as prioress, in what amounted, says Burton, to a posthumous victory over Greenfield. Power has speculated that de Stapleton's reason for resigning was not so much her age as the fact that she was intimidated into doing so: age may well have been "something of a euphemism; her reason doubtless took a concrete and menacing shape and wore a veil upon its undiminished head". (Note: The exact chronology of prioresses at Keldholme, as far as is known, is thus: Beatrice of Grendale, who had resigned by 29 January 1294; Emma of Stapleton from 1294 to 1301; then a likely vacancy to 1308; Emma de Ebor' was then appointed sometime around 20 April 1308 but had resigned by 30 July; Joan de Pykering, from Rosedale, was appointed on 30 July but had also resigned, on 17 February 1309; Emma of Stapleton, again, was confirmed on 7 March 1309, resigned—supposedly due to old age and sickness—on 13 February 1316; and then Emma de Ebor', again, who was confirmed on 17 March 1316.)

== Aftermath ==
The Registers and Episcopal records make little mention of Keldholme Priory after the election dispute until the house was closed in 1536 by the dissolution of the monasteries.

=== Assessment ===
For a period of nearly twenty years we see resistance on the part of the nuns to male authority. We see acts of resistance to attempts on the part of the Archbishop to impose a corporate identity on the community through acceptance of his nominee as prioress ... we see also the expression of individual wills and a sense on the part of the nuns of a local identity, one which they shared with the local community.

— Janet Burton

The historian Martin Heale has described the situation at Keldholme between 1308 and 1309 as an example of the "considerable friction" the imposition of a perceived outsider could cause within an enclosed community. Power has suggested that it illustrates the dangers of internal strife spreading beyond the priory's walls and impacting on neighbouring society. Janet Burton concurs, noting that it demonstrates that both the person of the prioress and her election were clearly of great interest to the wider community as well as the priory, between whom there was clearly a "close interaction". Valerie Spear suggests this is most likely because the position of prioress was a coveted one for local women. Also influential, says Spear, was that, as small priories were generally extremely poor, they often had to rely on charitable donations from the community to clothe and feed the nuns; this in turn doubtlessly "emboldened" locals to interest themselves in the nuns' business "to the point of downright interference".

Burton has called it "one of the most spectacular" disputes to affect early medieval religious houses. She also questions Archbishop Greenfield's supposition that there was no nun at Keldholme willing or able to be prioress; perhaps, she suggests, there were too many candidates, and the election dispute was a power struggle between them. It also suggests, she wrote, that female resistance to male authority was not as unknown as might have been presumed: "the Archbishop had stated that there were no nuns at Keldholme capable of holding office. The nuns clearly disagreed".
