= St Mary's Church, Marton in the Forest =

Church in North Yorkshire, England

Coordinates: 54°06′24″N 1°04′50″W

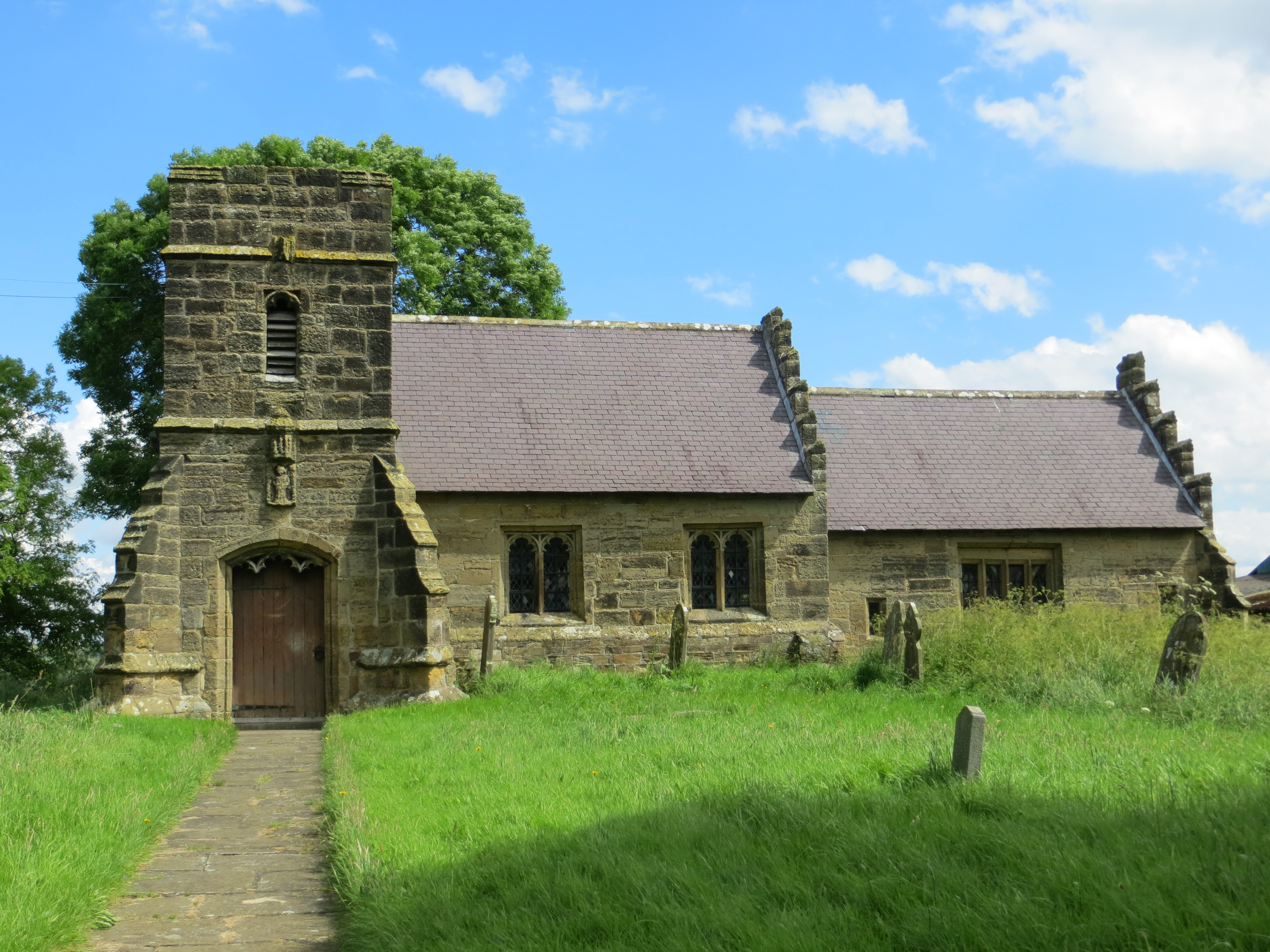
The church, in 2014

St Mary's Church is the parish church of Marton in the Forest, a village in North Yorkshire, in England.

The church was built early in the 12th century, from which period the north wall of the nave and chancel survive, along with the chancel arch and the lower parts of some other walls. It was largely rebuilt in about 1540, probably incorporating some stonework from Marton Priory, and adding a tower. In 1886, the church was restored by Ewan Christian. It was grade II* listed in 1960.

The church is built in stone and cobblestone on a chamfered plinth, and it has a Welsh slate roof with crow-stepped gables. It consists of a nave, a lower chancel and a south tower porch. The tower has two stages, angle buttresses, moulded string courses, single-light bell openings with cusped heads, and a plain parapet with moulded coping. The south door has a segmental head, and above it is a statue. Inside, there is a 13th-century font, a wooden altar rail dating from about 1700, and some 17th-century pew ends.

== See also ==
- Grade II* listed churches in North Yorkshire (district)
- Listed buildings in Marton-cum-Moxby
