= Whitley, North Yorkshire =

Village in North Yorkshire, England

Coordinates: 53.68429°N 1.15163°W

Whitley
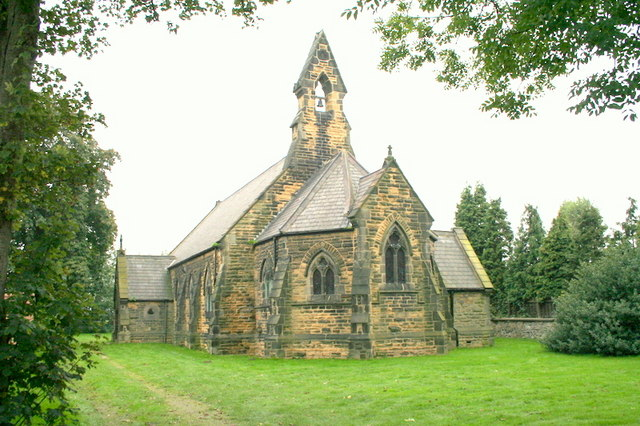
- All Saints Whitley

- Location within North Yorkshire
- Population: 1,021 (2011 census)
- OS grid reference: SE561212
- Unitary authority: North Yorkshire
- Ceremonial county: North Yorkshire
- Region: Yorkshire and the Humber
- Country: England
- Sovereign state: United Kingdom
- Post town: GOOLE
- Postcode district: DN14
- Dialling code: 01977
- Police: North Yorkshire
- Fire: North Yorkshire
- Ambulance: Yorkshire

Whitley is a village in North Yorkshire, England, close to the Aire and Calder Navigation and the M62 motorway. The population of the village at the 2001 census was recorded as being 574, which had risen to 1,021 by the time of the 2011 census. In 2015, North Yorkshire County Council estimated the population to have risen again to 1,110. It was historically part of the West Riding of Yorkshire until 1974. From 1974 to 2023 it was part of the Selby District, it is now administered by the unitary North Yorkshire Council.

== History ==
The village is recorded in the Domesday Book as Witelai, with the name deriving from the Old English words of hwīt and lēah, meaning White wood clearing. The village is located on the A19 road, south of its intersection with the M62 Motorway at Junction 34, 6 miles (9.7 km) west of Snaith and 7 miles (11 km) north east of Pontefract. The village is served by Whitley Bridge railway station to the north, but only has one train a day eastwards and only two westwards.

The village has a primary school and a church, the Chapel of All Saints, which was built between 1858 and 1861. A Knights Templar manor is believed to have existed south west of the village between 1248 and 1312. Unlike other Templar possessions which were taken over, when the order was dissolved, Whitley Preceptory was left to ruin.

== Governance ==
An electoral ward in the same name exists. This ward stretches south west to Kirk Smeaton with a total population taken at the 2011 census of 4,391.
