= Listed buildings in Marton-cum-Moxby =

Marton-cum-Moxby is a civil parish in the county of North Yorkshire, England. It contains five listed buildings that are recorded in the National Heritage List for England. Of these, one is listed at Grade II*, the middle of the three grades, and the others are at Grade II, the lowest grade. The parish contains the hamlets of Marton-in-the-Forest and Moxby and the surrounding countryside. The listed buildings consist of a church, a tomb in the churchyard, a farmhouse, a converted farm building, and a milepost.

== Key ==
Grade	Criteria
II*	Particularly important buildings of more than special interest
II	Buildings of national importance and special interest

== Buildings ==
Name and location	Photograph	Date	Notes	Grade
St Mary's Church; 54.10665°N 1.08065°W		12th century	The church has been altered and extended through the centuries, particularly in about 1540, and it was restored in 1886 by Ewan Christian. The church is built in stone and cobblestone on a chamfered plinth, and it has a Welsh slate roof with crow-stepped gables. It consists of a nave, a lower chancel and a south tower porch. The tower has two stages, angle buttresses, moulded string courses, single-light bell openings with cusped heads, and a plain parapet with moulded coping. The south door has a segmental head, and above it is a statue.	II*
Hill table tomb 54.10660°N 1.08069°W	—	c. 1783	The table tomb is in the churchyard of St Mary's Church, to the southeast of the tower, and is to the memory of members of the Hill family. It is in stone, and has a rectangular slab with a moulded edge and an inscription. This stands on six short hollow-moulded columns with moulded tops.	II
Spella Farmhouse; 54.12236°N 1.08919°W	—	c. 1800	The farmhouse is in stone, with quoins, an eaves band, and a pantile roof with raised verges, moulded kneelers and stone coping. There are two storeys and an attic, and two bays. Steps lead up to a central doorway with a fanlight, over which is a carved medieval stone. The windows are casements.	II
Cartshed and granary oppsite Church Farm; 54.10603°N 1.08054°W		Early 19th century (probable)	The farm building, later converted for residential use, is in red brick with stepped dentilled eaves, and a pantile roof with raised verges, moulded kneelers and stone coping. There are two storeys and five bays. It contains various openings, and on the gable end is a stairway leading to an upper door.	II
Milepost; 54.10660°N 1.10934°W	—	Late 19th century	The milepost is on the southwest side of the B1363 road. It is in cast iron, with a hollow back, a triangular plan, and a sloping top plate. On the top is inscribed "BULMER/WEST/H.D." and on the sides are pointing hands, the left side with the distance to Helmsley and the right side to York.	II
