= Foulbridge =

Site of a manor in North Yorkshire, England

Coordinates: 54.203°N 0.599°W

Foulbridge (Fuchebruge, 12th century; Fulkebridge, 12th, 16th century; Feukebrigg, 13th-14th centuries; Foukebrigg, 14th century; Fowbridge, 14th-16th centuries) is the site of a manor about 2 miles south of the village of Snainton in North Yorkshire, England. The River Derwent flows nearby. Land in the area formerly belonged to Rievaulx Abbey and Foulbridge Preceptory was located here. In medieval times the manor belonged to the Templars, before John de Dalton took over ownership in 1308.

== History ==
In 1177–81 and 1189–90, Foulbridge along with Settrington, were declared forefeit to the crown as it was disputed who should inherit the lands. Afterwards, Foulbridge passed into the overlordship of the Percys, Earls of Northumberland, and of the Mowbrays. John, Lord Mowbray died seised of the moiety of the manor, which must have escheated to him, in 1322, and in 1327 the demesne lands were said to have lain fallow since the Conquest.

Foulbridge was probably the "manor of Snainton" about which Ingram de Boynton and the Knights of the Temple made an agreement before 1226. John de Knapton also granted to that order rent and services in Snainton in the spring of 1240–1. In 1273 the knights held the manor and the "empty windmill" of Foulbridge, and in 1307 the manor, windmill and 260 acres in "waynage". The Templars remained in power at Foulbridge until John de Dalton took over ownership in 1308. A claim was made by the Earl of Lancaster in 1334 that on the suppression of this order the manor had escheated to him, the liberties of the Templars having become extinguished. Judgement, however, was given for the Hospitallers, to whom Edward II had confirmed the Templars' lands in 1324. On the ground that he was diverting its revenues from the hospital, the custody of the manor was ordered to be taken from Thomas Salkeld in 1359 and given to English members of the order.

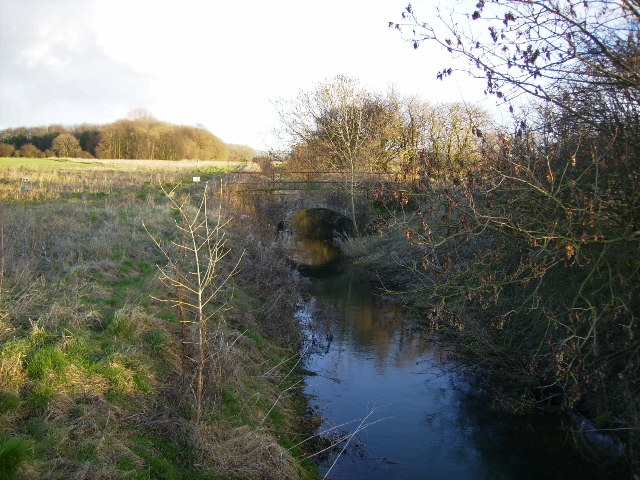
Bridge over the River Derwent at Foulbridge

Sir Ralph Eure's 'place' here is mentioned in 1537, and the manor, late the possession of the Hospitallers and in the tenure of Sir Ralph Eure, was in 1555–6 granted to the Archbishop of York, but no later mention of it has been found. The Templars were said in 1273 and 1307 to give alms to every pauper who came, for three days weekly, whether by right or charity the jurors did not know.

In 1334 the bridge and road of Pul within the forest, which were highways for "carriages, carts, drifts and packsaddles", were in decay and broken. It was proved that the repair of the bridge with the road to the east was incumbent on the Hospitallers by reason of their tenements at Foulbridge; the road to the west was reparable by the nuns of Yedingham.
