= Marton-cum-Moxby =

Civil parish in North Yorkshire, England

Coordinates: 54.104°N 1.077°W

- Civil parish
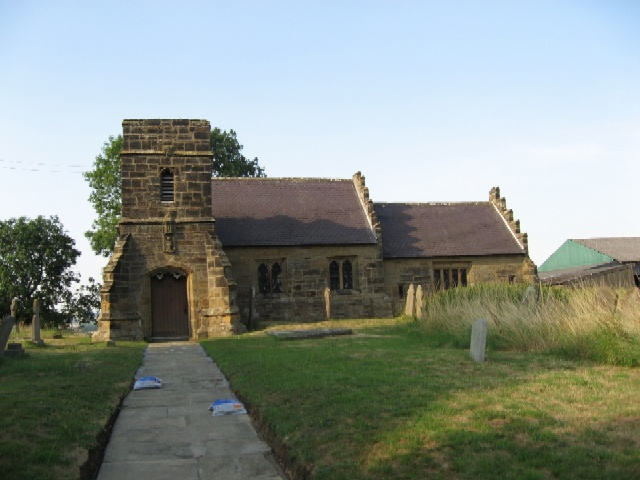
- The Parish Church of Marton-in-the-Forest

- Location within North Yorkshire
- OS grid reference: SE604680
- Civil parish: Marton-cum-Moxby
- Unitary authority: North Yorkshire
- Ceremonial county: North Yorkshire
- Region: Yorkshire and the Humber
- Country: England
- Sovereign state: United Kingdom
- Post town: YORK
- Postcode district: YO61
- Police: North Yorkshire
- Fire: North Yorkshire
- Ambulance: Yorkshire
- UK Parliament: Thirsk and Malton

Marton-cum-Moxby is a civil parish in North Yorkshire, England. The population of the parish was less than 100 at the time of the 2011 Census, therefore its details were included with Farlington. It lies to the east of the villages of Stillington and Farlington, near Easingwold. The settlements are the hamlets of Marton-in-the-Forest and Moxby, both agricultural in character.

== History ==
Both Marton-in-the-Forest and Moxby Hall are mentioned in the Domesday Book as Martun and Molesbi respectively. Both were part of the Bulford hundred.

The etymology of Marton comes from Old English of mere and tun meaning settlement in the marsh.

The civil parish was formed from the ancient Marton-cum-Moxby parish that arose from the Augustinian priories of Marton (monks) and Moxby (nuns). Boundary changes transferred land to Sutton-on-the-Forest in 1882 and Farlington in 1887.

== Governance ==
The parish is within the Thirsk and Malton UK Parliament constituency. From 1974 to 2023 it was part of the Hambleton District, it is now administered by the unitary North Yorkshire Council.

== Geography ==
The parish is bounded on the east by the River Foss and on the west by Farlington Beck. Much of the parish used to be a marsh prior to being drained by the nearby monasteries.

== Religion ==
St Mary's Church, Marton in the Forest is a Grade II* listed building built around 1540, though some parts indicate an older building.

== Notable buildings ==
The Priory of St Mary was founded by Bertram de Bulmer in 1158 as a joint house of monks and nuns at Marton, although by 1167 the nuns had moved to Moxby. Bulmer endowed the priory with lands at Burnsall and Thorpe. Henry II granted Moxby land in Huby, and the churches of Whenby and Thormanby. Both priories were suppressed by Henry VIII in 1536 during the Dissolution of the Monasteries. The remains of both priories are now scheduled monuments.

== See also ==
- Listed buildings in Marton-cum-Moxby
