= Allerton Mauleverer Priory =

Monastery in North Yorkshire, England

Coordinates: 54°01′20.4″N 1°21′33.9″W

Allerton Mauleverer Priory was a medieval monastic house in North Yorkshire, England. The site is in Allerton Mauleverer with Hopperton Parish in the former Harrogate District of North Yorkshire.

Richard Mauleverer founded the priory c. 1100 in the Benedictine order and granted them tithes and lands. The site was granted to the Abbey of Marmoutier in Normandy in 1110 which made it an alien priory.
