= Begar Priory =

Alien priory near Richmond, believed to be in Moulton, North Yorkshire, England

Coordinates: 54.4295°N 1.6371°W

Begar Priory was an alien priory near Richmond, believed to be in Moulton, North Yorkshire, England where old buildings known as "the Cell" (a common name for a Carthusian monastery) were located. The Carthusian monks who lived at Begar in the time of Henry III of England belonged to the Priory of Begare in Brittany. After suppression the house was granted variously by different kings to first the chantry of St. Ann at Thirsk, then to Eton College, then to Mount Grace Priory, and then back to Eton College again.
