= North Ferriby Priory =

Priory in the East Riding of Yorkshire, England

Coordinates: 53.718336°N 0.50587°W

North Ferriby Priory was a priory in the East Riding of Yorkshire, England, founded about 1160 by William de Vescy as a preceptory for the Knights Templar, after whose suppression it became a priory of the Austin canons. According to others, it was founded about 1200 by Lord Eustace Broomfleet de Vesci. One of the canons was usually appointed vicar of the church in North Ferriby. The priory was suppressed on 13 August 1536. The buildings have been demolished since. The priory is still remembered in the street name "Priory Avenue" and in the "Priory Rooms" of the 20th-century village hall.

== Burials ==
- Gerard de Furnival
- Gerard Usflete
- Sir Gerard de Usflete (died 1350)
