= Pontefract Friary =

Monastery in West Yorkshire, England

Coordinates: 53.689°N 1.311°W

St Richard's Friary, also known as Pontefract Friary, was a Dominican friary in Pontefract, West Yorkshire, England. It was located near today's Pontefract General Infirmary, on the eastern edge of Friarwood Valley Gardens.

== History ==
It was founded in 1256 on six acres of land donated by Edmund de Lacy in honour of Richard de Wych, Bishop of Chichester at the edge of the town. The town centre was by then already too densely built to offer a large enough building site. The Dominicans, also known as Black Friars, were a mendicant order without property; so land, building materials, food, and clothing were given to them as an act of charity. The friars of Pontefract were allowed to preach and beg in a territory encompassed by Pontefract, Rotherham and Wakefield, and Pope John XXII awarded them in 1330 the right to preach, hear confessions, and conduct funerals. The heart of Edmund de Lacy was buried in the Dominican church. In 1269 the friary was the place of arbitrations of disputes between the Cluniac monks of Pontefract and Monk Bretton. Multiple bequests were made for the benefit of the friary, and a number of notable persons were buried there. The friary also served as overflow accommodation on the occasion of royal visits to Pontefract Castle.

King Henry VIII ordered the friary to be dissolved in 1538. The buildings were stripped and demolished, valuables were sold, and the land reverted to agricultural use, in particular the cultivation of liquorice, until the spread of Pontefract hospital across the site in the late 1890s. Remains of the buildings lie today under the site of the demolished former hospital.

== Architecture ==
The friary church had a long nave with a narrow chancel. South of it lay all the other friary buildings, including the cloister, around which ranged dormitory, chapter house, refectory, kitchens, lavatories and guest accommodations. Window tracery remains found during excavations have been dated to 1360 to 1380, tallying with reports of the first church being in ruins by the 1370s and having been rebuilt at that time.

== Archaeology ==
There were archaeological excavations in 1963 (on the occasion of the proposed expansion of Pontefract General Infirmary), in 2011 and in 2012. They served to locate the remains of several buildings of the friary and of a number of burials, as well as to illuminate the post-dissolution history of the site.
