= Marton Priory =

Former priory in North Yorkshire, England

Coordinates: 54°07′04.6″N 1°06′27.7″W

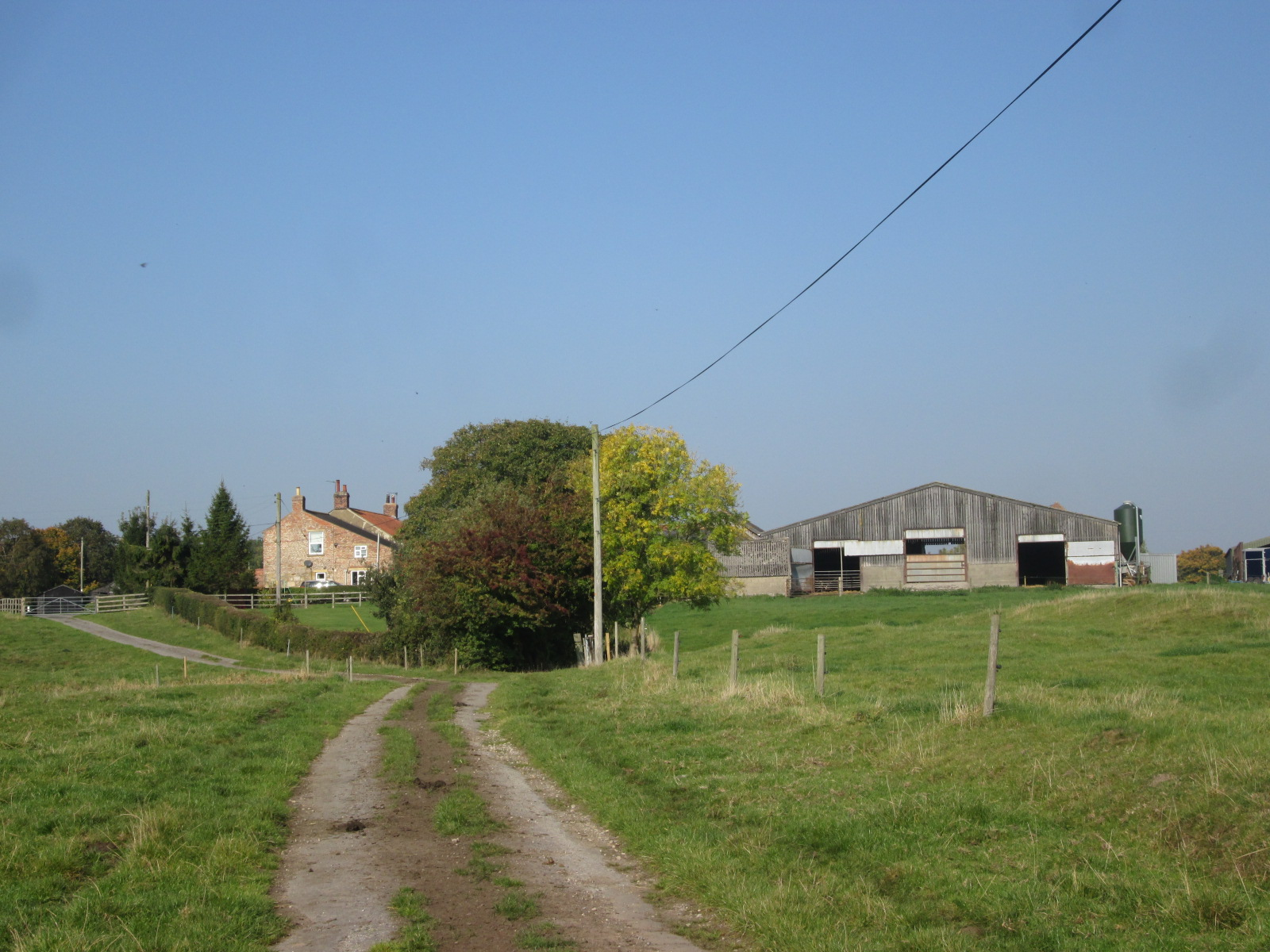
Marton Abbey Farm on the site of the former priory

Marton Priory was a priory in North Yorkshire, England. It was founded in 1154 and was occupied by both Augustinian canons and canonesses, although this double house was short-lived, the canonesses moving to Moxby Priory in 1167. The priory had a water mill on the River Foss, the earthworks to this can still be seen today in the fields of the farmhouse that occupy the site. The farmhouse also has evidence in its walls of having the original stones from the priory used in its construction.

It surrendered to King Henry VIII's agents during the Dissolution of the Lesser Monasteries on 9 February 1536.

The land around Marton Abbey Farm is owned by the Church Commissioners.
