= Birstall Priory =

Former religious house in Yorkshire, England

Coordinates: 53°38′38.2″N 0°03′20.9″E

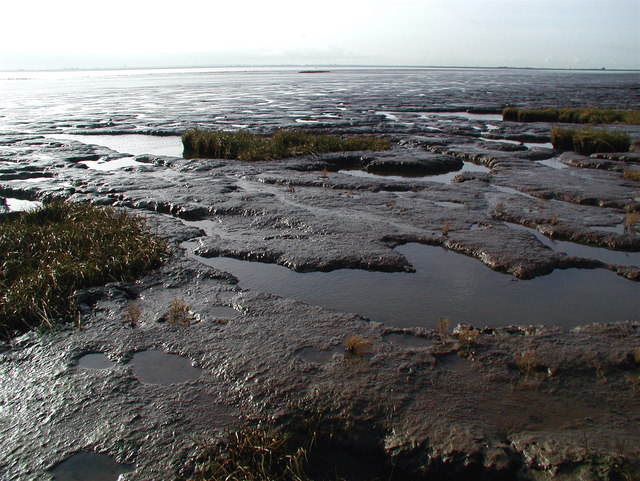
Approximate site of the former priory

Birstall Priory or Burstall Priory was a priory in the East Riding of Yorkshire, England. The priory was built around 1219 and continuing as an inhabited religious house until the Dissolution of the Monasteries between 1536 and 1541. Burstall Bank and Burstall Lane are still in existence near the north bank of the Humber Estuary, south of Skeffling, but Birstall Priory itself has long since been given up to the sea.
