= Keldholme Priory =

Cistercian nunnery in North Yorkshire, England

Coordinates: 54°15′58.9″N 0°54′53.0″W

Keldholme Priory was a Cistercian nunnery in Kirkbymoorside, North Yorkshire, England. It was established by one of the Robert de Stutvilles in either the reign of Henry I or II. Two graves are visible, built into the wall of the modern Priory, a house built on the site of the nunnery. The Priory experienced great upheaval in the early 14th century during a disputed election as to who would be Prioress.
