= Fors Abbey =

Ruined abbey in North Yorkshire, England

Coordinates: 54°18′46.2″N 2°06′05.6″W

Fors Abbey was an abbey in Low Abbotside, Askrigg, North Yorkshire, England.

It was built in 1145 for the Savigniac order and converted to the Cistercian order in 1147. The land was granted to them in 1145 by Akarius Fitz Bardolf. The abbey was abandoned in 1156 when lands became available at Jervaulx further down the Ure valley.

When the North Eastern Railway built its line through Askrigg in the 1870s, skeletons were unearthed near to the site of Fors Abbey and it was speculated that these were former residents of the abbey.
