= St Annes Monastic House =

Monastery in North Yorkshire, England

Coordinates: 53°58′04″N 1°04′37″W

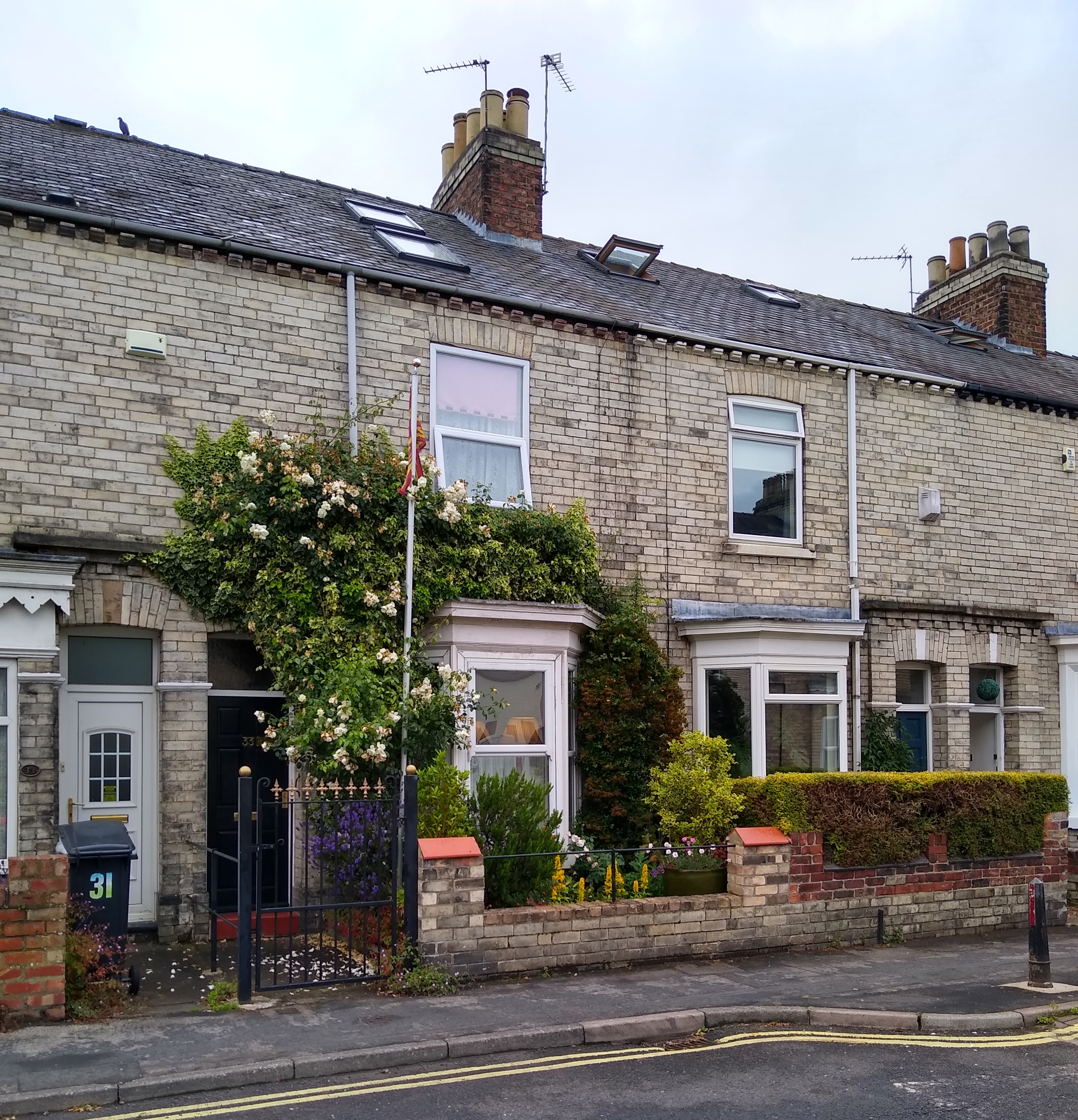
St Annes Monastic House

St Annes Monastic House is an Orthodox monastic house in North Yorkshire, England. The house is from modern times, being founded in 1995 and is located north east of York Minster.
