= Whitley Preceptory =

Priory

Coordinates: 53.6781°N 1.1608°W

Whitley Preceptory was a priory in North Yorkshire, England. The site of the priory is thought to have been located 0.62 miles (1 km) south west of the village of Whitley and was one of twelve run by the Knights Templar in Yorkshire alone. Whilst the exact location of the manor house is unknown, the presence of a moat at grid reference SE555205, is thought to indicate the possible location of the priory.

It is known to have been in the possession of the Templars by 1248, but was probably in use before that time. Sometime between 1308 and 1312, the preceptory was abandoned after the suppression of the Knights Templar.

As the site cannot be positively identified, some have suggested the manor was in Weedley, a deserted medieval village in the East Riding of Yorkshire.
