= Stocking Abbey =

Monastery in Oldstead, North Yorkshire, England

Coordinates: 54°12′50.7″N 1°11′15.3″W

Stocking Abbey was an abbey in the village of Oldstead, North Yorkshire, England.

The abbey at Stocking was built in 1147, originally for Savigniac monks, but soon became Cistercian. It was meant to be a temporary establishment as no suitable site for a permanent settlement had been found yet. The monks that worshipped at Stocking moved to Byland Abbey 30 years later in 1177.

Excavations and archaeological investigations have offered evidence that the cloister and small stone church may have existed on the site of Oldstead Hall, though the proof is not conclusive.
