= High Sheriff of Cleveland =

Ceremonial officer of Cleveland, England

The High Sheriff of Cleveland was a High Sheriff title which was in existence from 1974 until 1996, covering Cleveland, England.

The county of Cleveland was formed from parts of the North Riding of Yorkshire and County Durham in 1974 by the Local Government Act 1972 and was served by its own High Sheriff, replacing the High Sheriff of Yorkshire and High Sheriff of County Durham. The county was abolished in 1996 and since that time various parts have been merged into the High Sheriff of North Yorkshire and High Sheriff of County Durham titles.

Below is a list of the sheriffs.

== List of High Sheriffs ==
- 1974–1975 Dr Frank Ogle Graham, of 60 Meadowfield, Stokesley, Middlesbrough.
- 1975–1976 Major George Arthur Bulwer Jenyns, of The Timber House, Hutton Lowcross, Guisborough.
- 1976–1977 Colonel John Ashton Pounder, of "Larkhill", 10 Carisbrooke Road, West Park, Hartlepool.
- 1977–1978 Major David de Guise Walford, of Ouston Moor House, Stockton-on-Tees.
- 1978–1979 Richard Hoyle, of Fir Tree Farm, Hilton, Yarm-on-Tees.
- 1979–1980 Captain James Rae Southall, of Ayton Firs, Great Ayton, Middlesbrough.
- 1980–1981 Richard Thompson Pickersgill, of "Roxby", 24 Junction Road, Norton, Stockton-on-Tees.
- 1981–1982 John Hunter Peart, of Beechlands, Elwick Road, Hartlepool.
- 1982–1983 Charles Edward Shopland, of 97 Birchwood Road, Marton, Middlesbrough.
- 1983–1984 Richard Crosthwaite, of Langbaurgh Hall, Great Ayton, Middlesbrough.
- 1984–1985 Richard Neville Spark, of The Grange, 46 Hartburn Village, Stockton-on-Tees.
- 1985–1986 James Michael Wright, of Hallow Hill, Castle Eden, Hartlepool.
- 1986–1987 Philip Niman, of 11 Green Lane, Middlesbrough.
- 1987–1988 Major James Michael Catterall, of Waterside, Croft-on-Tees, Darlington, County Durham.
- 1988–1989 Hannah Bloom, of Hawthorn, Leven Road, Yarm.
- 1989–1990 David Hunter Peart, of Beechlands, Elwick Road, Hartlepool.
- 1990–1991 Robert Michael Stewart, of Hutton House, Guisborough.
- 1991–1992 Malcolm Tutin D'Arcy, of Chapel House, Crathorne, Yarm.
- 1992–1993 Graham Corlett Mitchell, of 37 The Green, Norton, Stockton-on-Tees
- 1993–1994 David Manners, of Tunstall Hall, Tunstall, Hartlepool.
- 1994–1995 George Derek Saul, of 6 Hawthorne Grove, Yarm.
- 1995–1996 David John Dugdale, of Park House, Crathorne, Yarm.
