= Swine Priory =

Coordinates: 53.806268°N 0.279070°W

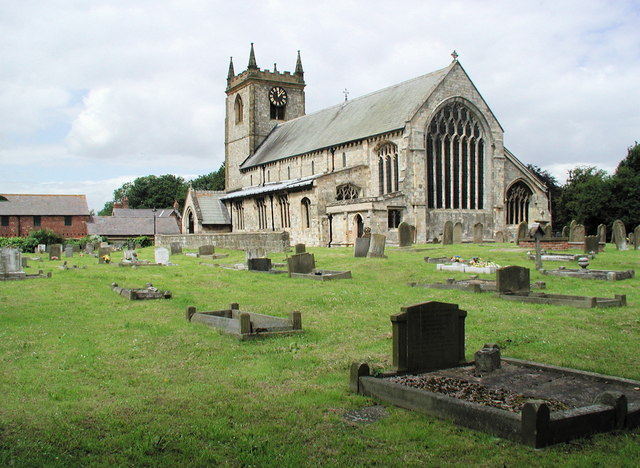
Swine parish church, formerly the conventual church of Swine Priory

Swine Priory was a priory in the village of Swine in the East Riding of Yorkshire, England. The site of the Cistercian nunnery is a Scheduled Monument.

The nunnery was in existence from the 12th century until 1539. Little remains of the buildings but extensive earthworks and the remains of fishponds, drains and a moat are still visible. Part of the nunnery church was incorporated into the existing Church of St Mary.

== History ==
The nunnery was founded in the 12th century by Robert de Verli, under Fountains Abbey, initially with 14 nuns and a prioress, and was dedicated to the Virgin Mary. In 1177 a papal bull from Pope Alexander III confirmed the Cistercian rights of the house. By 1181 when Henry II confirmed the house it included a master, canons, brothers and nuns. In subsequent years the separation of men and women within the institution was criticised as not being as good as it should be. In 1404 Walter Skirlaw, who was Bishop of Durham from 1388 to 1406, bequeathed £100 to the nuns of Swine. There were several disputes with the nearby Meaux Abbey. The nunnery was closed as part of the dissolution of the monasteries 1539. When the priory surrendered on 9 September 1539 there was a prioress and 19 nuns.

The Church of St Mary, which was built around 1180, was the conventual church of the Priory. The current building contains parts of the nunnery church which was 25 metres (82 ft) long.

The remains contain earthworks which show where the previous buildings used to be. These included a four-sided cloister surrounded by a moat which was up to 2 metres (6 ft 7 in) deep and 5 metres (16 ft) to 10 metres (33 ft) wide and a series of drains. There were also a series of fishponds and there is evidence of ridge and furrow.
