= Penhill Preceptory =

Priory in North Yorkshire, England

Coordinates: 54°17′40.0″N 1°56′40.7″W

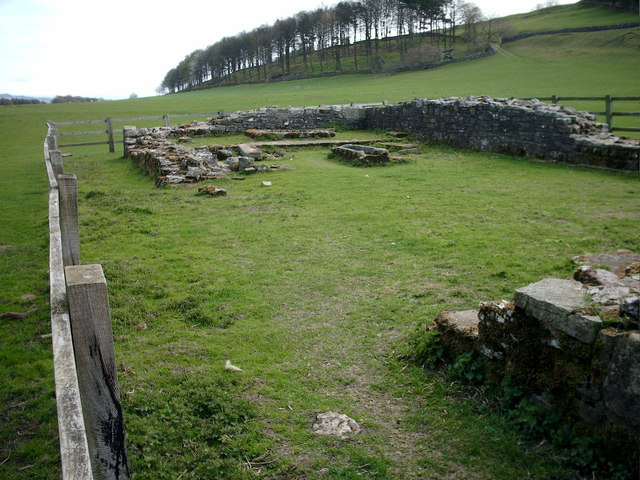
Remains of a chapel and of graves

Penhill Preceptory was a priory on the northern flanks of Penhill in Wensleydale, North Yorkshire, England, which functioned from about 1142 to 1308–12.

== See also ==
- Listed buildings in West Witton
