= Ribston Preceptory =

Priory in North Yorkshire, England

Coordinates: 53.97855°N 1.40402°W

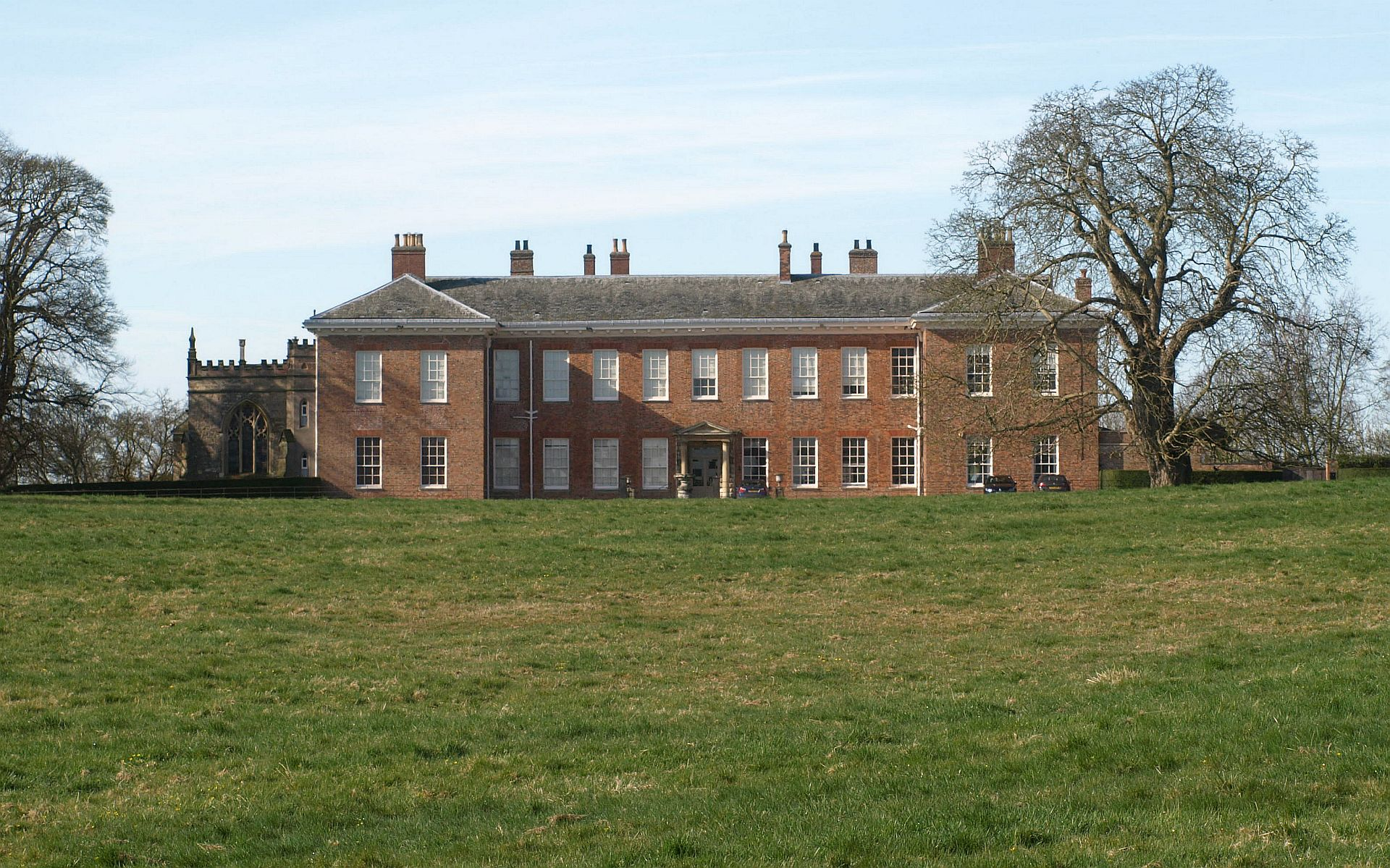
Ribston Hall with the 13th century chapel to the left

Ribston Preceptory was a priory just east of the village of Little Ribston, in North Yorkshire, England on the east bank of the River Nidd. The preceptory at Ribston was founded in 1217, when Robert de Ros donated the land and advowson of Ribston to the Knights Templar.

When the Knights Templar were suppressed between 1308 and 1312, the preceptory at Ribston was granted to the Knights Hospitaller. They held it until the Dissolution in 1540, but by this point they had mostly abandoned it and it was being worked by Lay farmers.

In 1674, the now grade II* listed Ribston Hall was erected on the site, however a 13th-century chapel which adjoins the hall survives.

== Burials in the chapel ==
- Sir John Goodricke, 1st Baronet
- Sir Henry Goodricke, 2nd Baronet
- Sir Henry Goodricke, 4th Baronet
