= Foulbridge Preceptory =

Preceptory in Snainton, England

Coordinates: 54°12′11.7″N 0°36′01.8″W

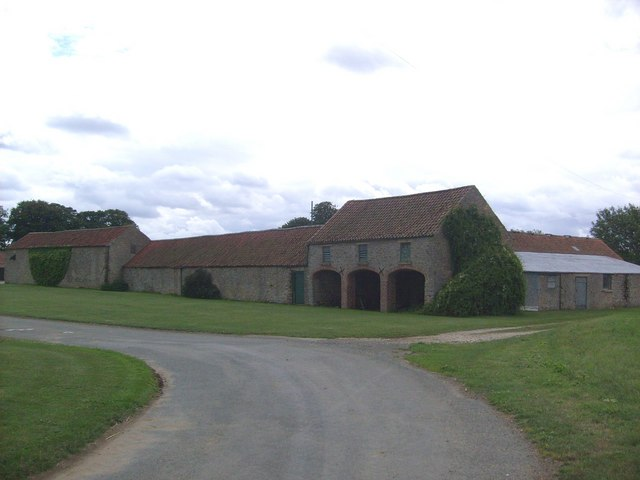
Foulbridge Farm on the grounds of the former preceptory

Foulbridge Preceptory was a preceptory of the Knights Templar at Foulbridge near Snainton in North Yorkshire, England of which there is little information. Upon the Dissolution of the Monasteries it possessed the estates of Foukebridge, Allerston, and Wydale. Richard de Hales is the only preceptor known by name due to his arrest in 1308. Foulbridge Farm now stands on the grounds of the former preceptory and has incorporated some remains of the latter.
