= Copmanthorpe Preceptory =

Medieval monastic house in North Yorkshire, England

Coordinates: 53°54′26.5″N 1°07′09.0″W

Copmanthorpe Preceptory was a medieval monastic house in North Yorkshire, England.

The manor of Copmanthorpe was given to the Knights Templar by William Malbys, with the earliest reference to the Templars’ ownership being from a confirmatory charter by William de Ros who died in 1258. In 1292 the preceptor of Copmanthorpe, who at this time was Robert de Reygate, is recorded as being the keeper of the mills beside York Castle.
