= Moxby Priory =

Monastery in North Yorkshire, England

Coordinates: 54°05′41.9″N 1°05′23.6″W

Moxby Priory is the commonly used name of the former Augustinian nunnery of S. John the Apostle in today's parish of Marton-cum-Moxby, North Yorkshire, England.

== Geography ==
The nunnery occupied grounds around Moxby Hall Farm on the western bank of a bend of the River Foss, about 1500 m ESE of Stillington.The site of the principal claustral buildings is now occupied by a farm, but earthworks of ancillary structures and of the medieval and later garden are still extant and form a historic monument. The site of a mill, once powered by the River Foss, is also preserved in the southwestern part of the monument. Other remains, possibly related to the religious site, were discovered in the 1950s to the west and southwest, but have been obscured by farming. The earthworks also show evidence of fishponds. Nearby to the West is a spring (St John's Well) which is a source of ferruginous (chalybeate; "ka'LIBATE") waters, long thought to have health-giving properties.

== Significance ==
Moxby is the only known example of a double monastery (also called double house) of the Augustinian order. While most double monasteries, of which less than 30 examples have been identified in England, combine the establishments of both the male and the female orders in a single place, Moxby is an even rarer case in that the two parts were housed at completely separate sites. The monks lived at Marton-in-the-Forest.

== History ==
A double monastery of Augustinian canons and nuns was founded by Bertram de Bulmer in 1158 as the Priory of St Mary at Marton. The nuns had moved to Moxby by 1167. While in 1310 the nuns of Moxby were recorded as Benedictines, by 1326 they were known as Augustinians. In 1322 the house was dispersed by Scottish raids, and some instances of apostasy were recorded in 1312 and 1321. The nunnery was small and never counted more than 10 nuns. The religious communities at Moxby as well as at Marton were suppressed in 1536. There is evidence that the site, in particular the mill and the garden, remained in use after the dissolution. The nunnery had been converted into a mansion which was pulled down in the 1850s. The existing farm covers the former conventual area. The mill was modified in the 18th century when the river was dammed, creating a mill pond which has fallen dry since. Only its northern bank survives.
