= Wetherby Preceptory =

Monastic house in West Yorkshire, England

Coordinates: 53.9322°N 1.3861°W

Wetherby Preceptory was a medieval monastic house in Wetherby, West Yorkshire, England. The estate at Wetherby was given to the Templars around 1240 and was held by them until they were suppressed in 1308. Thereafter it was held by the Knights Hospitaller until 1538.
