= List of monastic houses in Norfolk =

The following is a list of monastic houses in Norfolk, England.

Locations of monastic houses in Norfolk

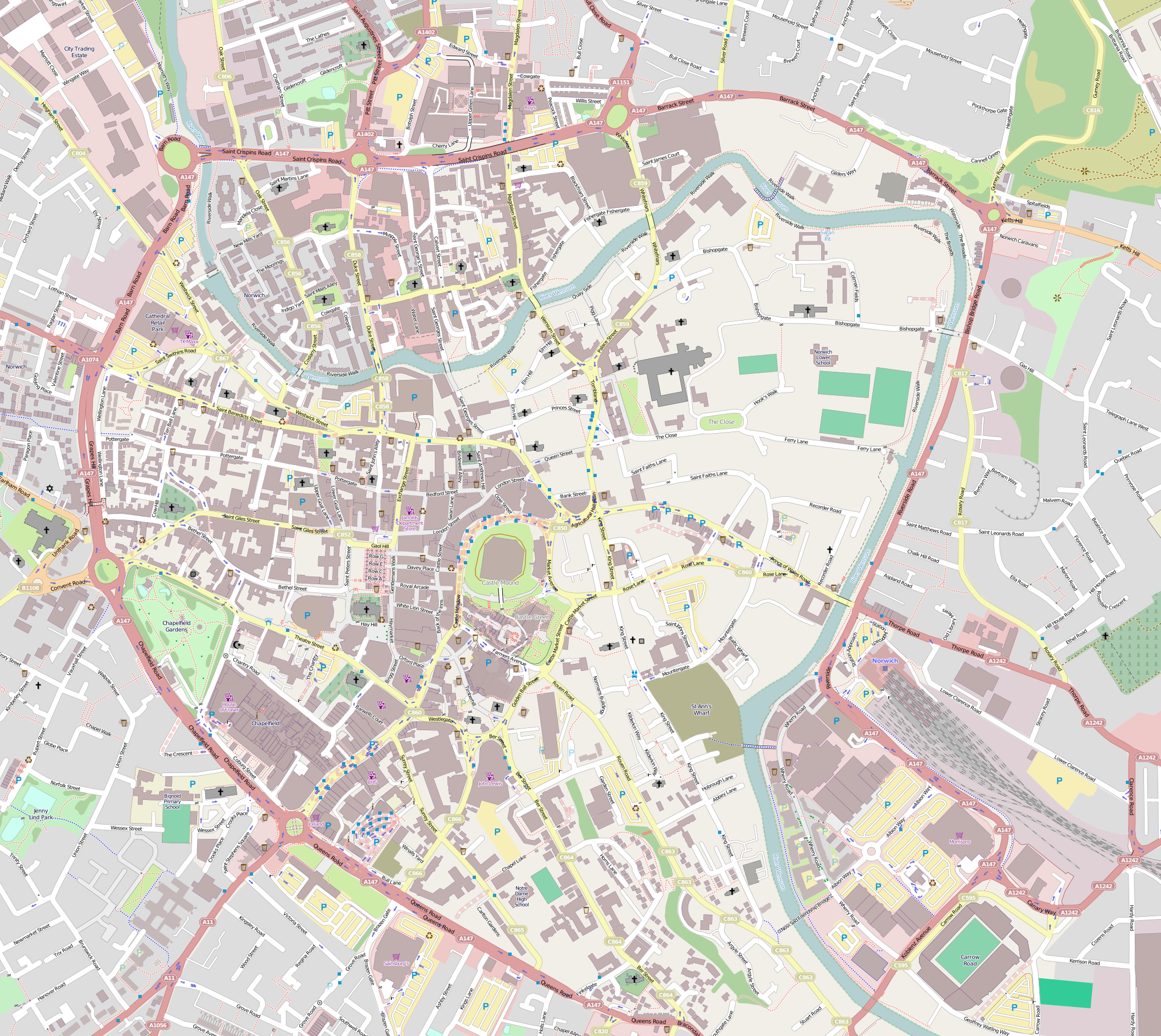
Locations of monastic houses in Norwich
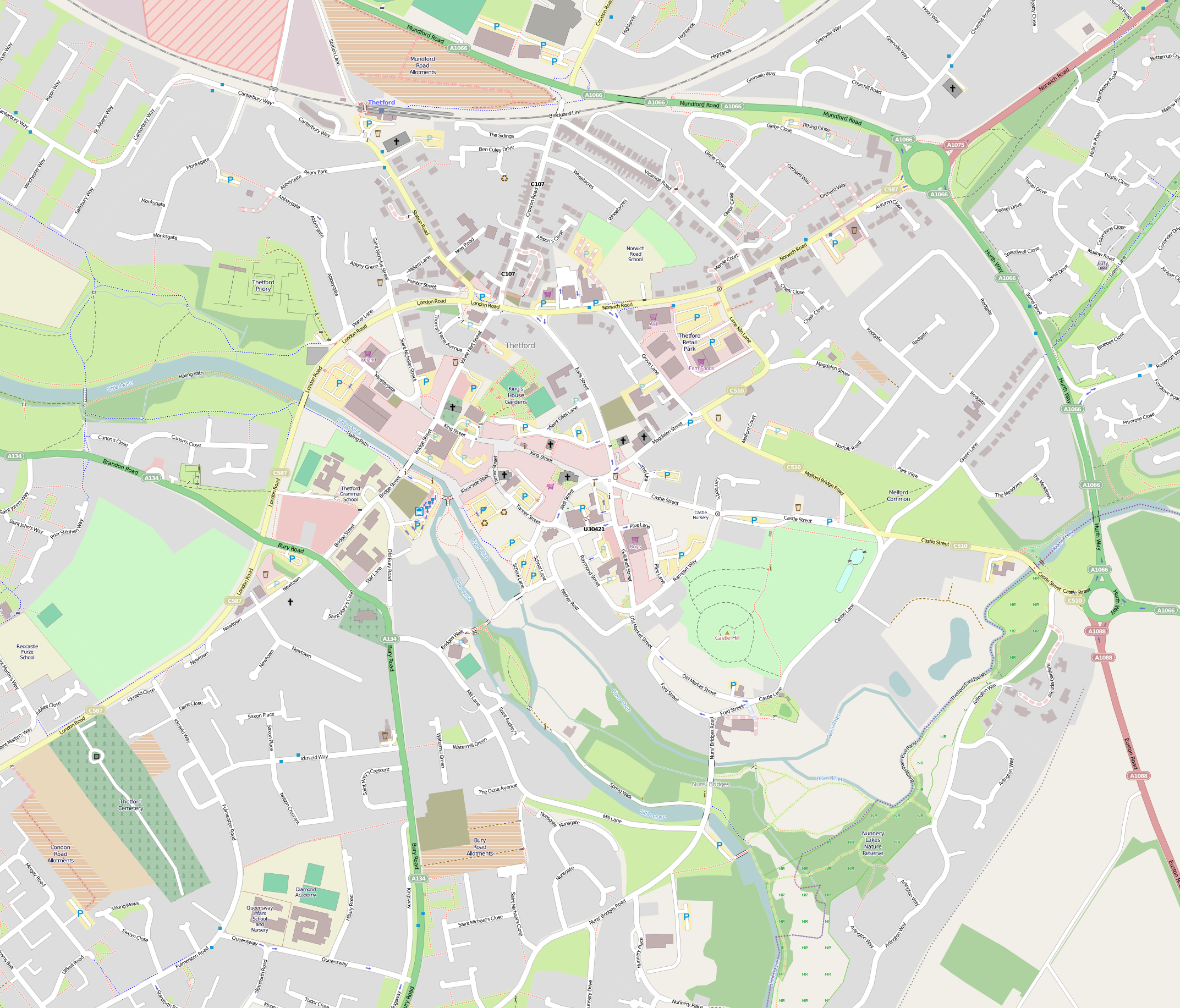
Locations of monastic houses in Thetford
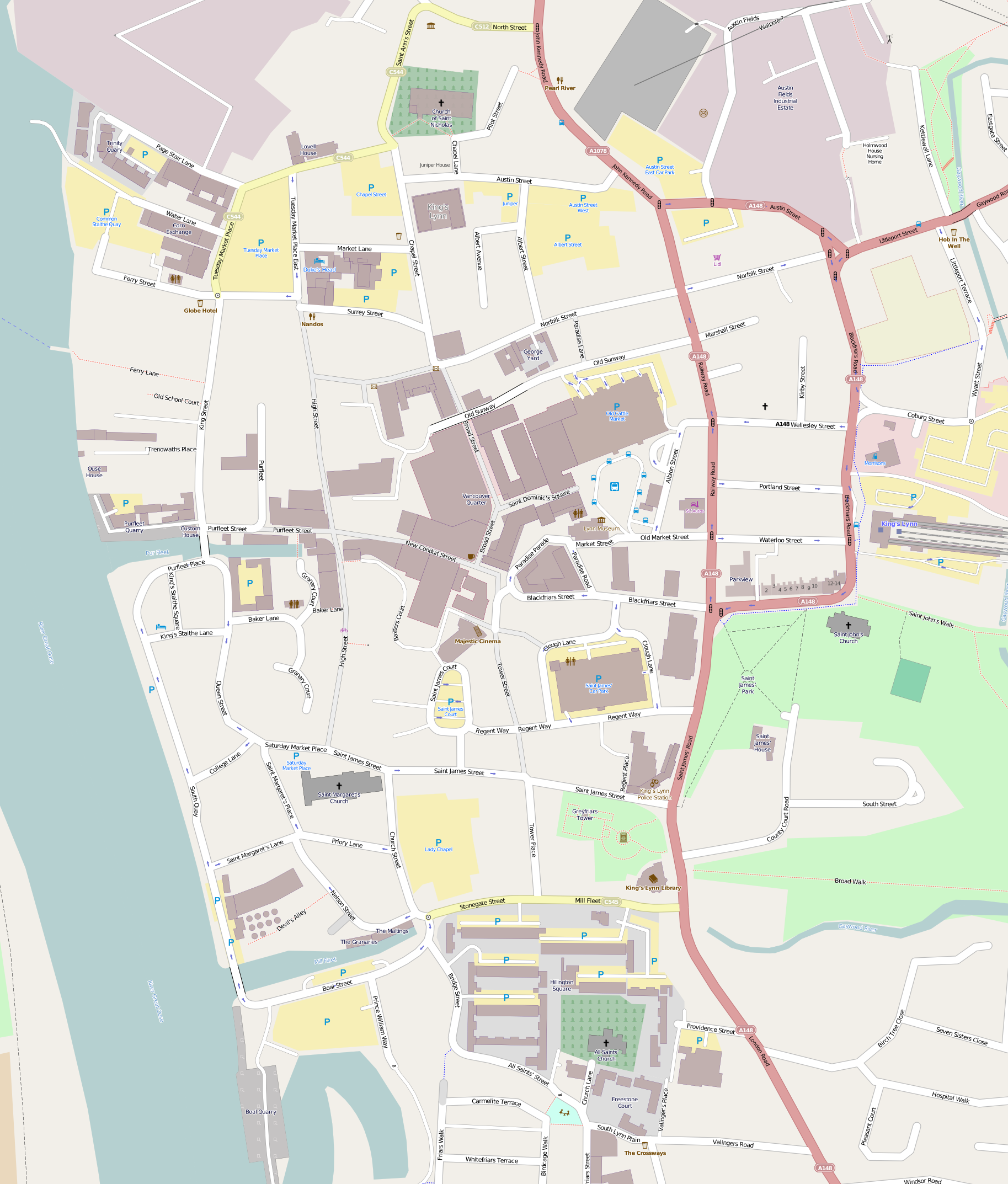
Locations of monastic houses in King's Lynn
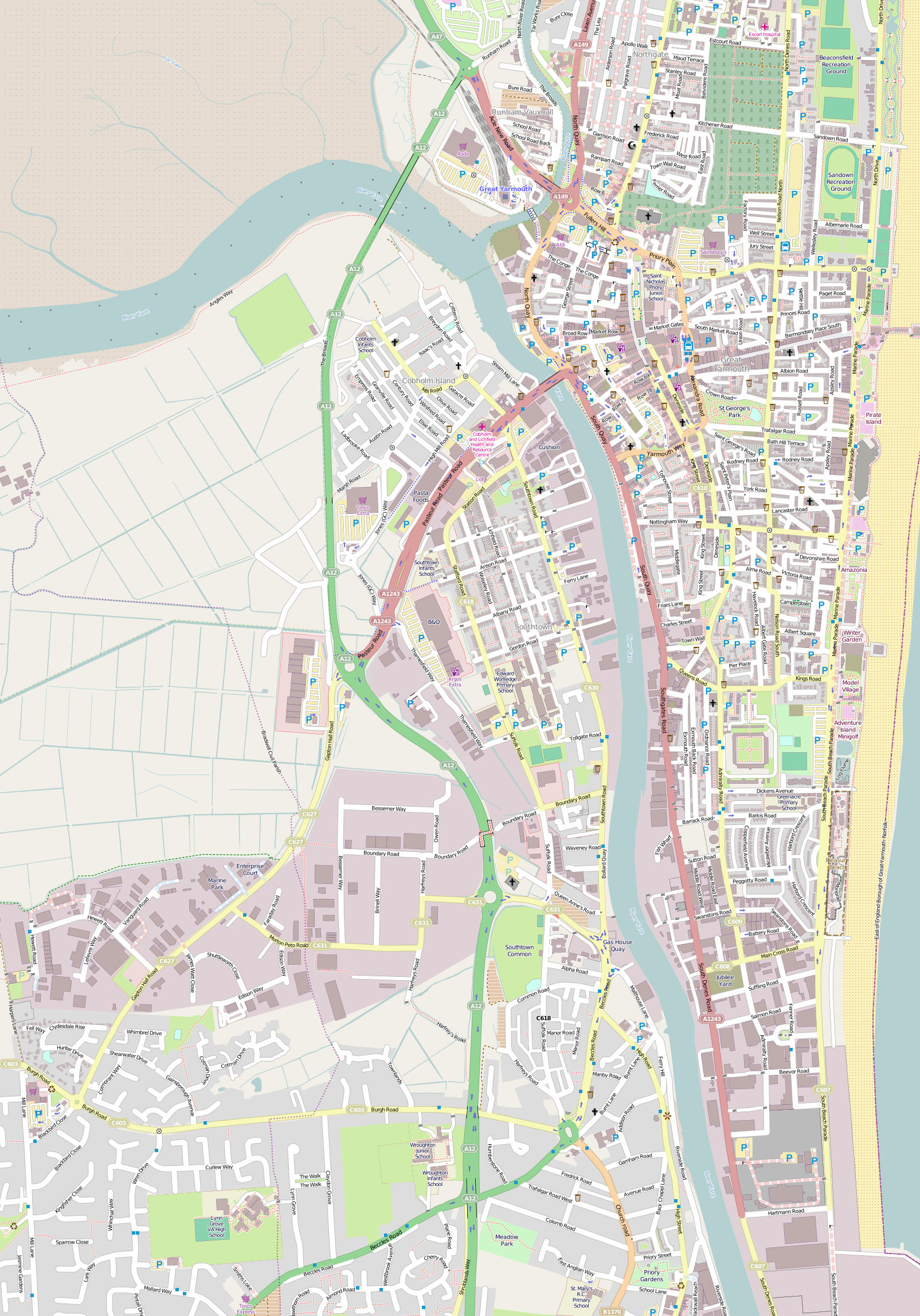
Locations of monastic houses in Great Yarmouth

Alien houses are included, as are smaller establishments such as cells and notable monastic granges (particularly those with resident monks), and also camerae of the military orders of monks (Knights Templar and Knights Hospitaller). Monastic hospitals are included where they had the status or function of an abbey, priory, or preceptor/commandery.

Abbreviations and key

Status of remains
Symbol	Status
None	Ruins
*	Current monastic function
^{+}	Current non-monastic ecclesiastic function (including remains incorporated into later structure)
^	Current non-ecclesiastic function (including remains incorporated into later structure) or redundant intact structure
^{$}	Remains limited to earthworks etc.
^{#}	No identifiable trace of the monastic foundation remains
^{~}	Exact site of monastic foundation unknown
^{≈}	Identification ambiguous or confused

Locations with names in italics indicate possible duplication (misidentification with another location) or non-existent foundations (either erroneous reference or proposed foundation never implemented) or ecclesiastical establishments with a monastic name but lacking actual monastic connection.

Trusteeship
EH	English Heritage
LT	Landmark Trust
NT	National Trust

== List ==
Foundation	Image	Communities and provenance	Formal name or dedication and alternative names	References and location
Aldeby Priory ^^{(+)}		Benedictine monks dependent on Norwich; founded c.1100-1119 (during the reign of Henry I) by Herbert de Losinga, Bishop of Norwich; lack of evidence for a conventual church infers that the monks officiated at the parochial church of St Mary which was granted to the priory; granted to the Dean and Prebendary of Norwich	The Priory Church of Saint Mary, Aldeby Priory	52°28′43″N 1°35′56″E
Beeston Regis Priory		Augustinian Canons Regular founded c.1216 (about the end of the reign of King John) by Lady Margery de Cressy; Carmelite Friars refounded 1400; dissolved 1539; granted to Sir Edmond Windham and Giles Seafoule 1545/6	The Priory Church of Saint Mary, Beeston Regis ____________________; Beeston Priory	52°56′19″N 1°13′27″E
Binham Priory ^{+}		Benedictine monks priory cell dependent on St Albans Abbey, Hertfordshire; founded c.1091 (before 1093) by Peter de Valoines, manor granted by William the Conqueror; dissolved 1539; granted to Sir Thomas Paston; demolition ensued but the plan to build a mansion was abandoned; nave of conventual church in parochial use as the Priory Church of St Mary and the Holy Cross. Owned by Norfolk Archaeological Trust and English Heritage	The Priory Church of Saint Mary the Virgin, Binham Priory The Priory Church of St Peter and St Paul, Binham?	52°55′12″N 0°56′48″E
Blackborough Priory ^		Benedictine monks founded c.1150 by Roger de Scales and his wife Muriel; Benedictine monks and nuns granted extended for use as a double house by Robert de Scales, son of the founders c.1170(?); Benedictine nuns alone 1200; dissolved 1537; granted to the Bishop of Norwich 1550/1; remains incorporated into a private house	The Priory Church of the Blessed Virgin Mary and Saint Catherine, Blackborough	52°41′54″N 0°28′30″E
Blakeney Friary		Carmelite Friars land granted 1295/6 by Richard Stomer and others with the consent of their lord Sir William Roos; founded 1304-16; buildings completed 1321; dissolved 1538; granted to William Rede 1541/2; granted to Lady Anne Calthorpe; passed to the local Pepys family; remains incorporated into Friarage Farmhouse	Snitterley Whitefriars; Sniterley Whitefriars	Blakeney52°57′19″N 1°01′24″E
Bradmer Friary		Carmelite Friars founded c.1241 (1242-7) by Ralph Hempnale (Hemenhale) and Sir William de Calthrop; transferred to new site at Burnham Norton c.1253		
Bromehill Priory		Augustinian Canons Regular founded before 1224 by Sir Hugh de Plaiz; dissolved 14 May 1528 for Cardinal Thomas Wolsey's college at Ipswich; priory demolished; granted to the Fellows of Christ's College, Cambridge by Edward VI	The Priory Church of the Blessed Virgin Mary and Saint Thomas the Martyr, Bromehill	52°27′26″N 0°37′59″E
Bromholm Priory		Cluniac monks alien house: dependent on Castle Acre Priory; founded 1113 by William de Glanville; direct Cluniac rule c.1195;became denizen: independent from 1390; dissolved 1536; granted to Thomas Woodhouse 1545/6	The Priory Church of St Andrew, Bromholm ____________________; Broomholm Priory	52°50′46″N 1°28′57″E
Burnham Norton Friary		Carmelite Friars (community founded at Bradmer c.1241 (1242-7)); transferred from Bradmer 1253 (1252); dissolved 1538; granted to William, Lord Cobham 1541/2		52°57′04″N 0°44′06″E
Carbrooke Preceptory		possibly Knights Templar possibly founded before 1173 by granted by the husband of Maud, Countess of Clare, with preceptory unfinished; Knights Hospitaller founded c.1182: Maud, Countess of Clare granted churches of St Peter, Great Carbrook and St John the Baptist, Little Carbrook and manor of Carbrook; dissolved 1540; granted to Sir Richard Gresham and Sir Richard Southwell 1543/4	Carbroke Preceptory 52°34′54″N 0°52′42″E	
Carbrook Cell		Sisters of the Order of St John of Jerusalem cell founded unknown, transferred to Buckland c.1180		
Carrow Priory		Benedictine nuns (community founded at Norwich between 1100 and 1135); transferred here 1146, founded by two sisters of the earlier site which was granted land by King Stephen; dissolved 1536; granted to Sir John Shelton 1538; prioress's house incorporated into later residence; remains situated within the grounds of Reckitt & Colman's works	The Priory Church of Saint Mary of Carhowe	52°37′06″N 1°18′41″E
Castle Acre Priory		Cluniac monks alien house: dependent on Lewes, Sussex; founded 1089 (or before 1085) by William de Warenne, 2nd Earl of Surrey;became denizen: independent from sometime between 1351 and 1374; dissolved 22 November 1537; granted to Thomas Howard, Duke of Norfolk 1537/8; priors lodgings retained as a residence; passed into ownership of Sir Edward Coke, and remains in that family; in guardianship of Ministry of Works 1929; (EH)	The Priory Church of Saint Mary, Castle Acre Priory Church of Saint Mary, Saint Peter and Saint Paul ____________________; Castleacre Priory	52°42′00″N 0°41′06″E
Choseley Monastery		Lazarites founded before 1273 (before the reign of Edward I) by the Earl of Gifford; dissolved 1544/5; granted Sir John Dudley, Viscount Lisle		
Coxford Priory		Augustinian Canons Regular (community founded at the church of St Mary, Rudham (East) c.1140); transferred to new site c.1216 (early in the reign of Henry III); dissolved 22 January 1536; granted to Thomas, Duke of Norfolk 1537	Cokesford Priory	52°49′37″N 0°44′30″E
Crabhouse Priory		Augustinian Canonesses founded c.1181 by Roger, prior, and canons of Ranham (Norman's Burrow) with the consent of their founder William de Lesewis (Leseurs) for the anchoress Lena; flooded and temporarily abandoned c.1200; church and many buildings partly rebuilt 1402-4; rebuilt 1420-4; dissolved 1536; granted to Sir John Gage; house named 'Crabb's Abbey' built on site	The Priory Church of the Blessed Virgin Mary and Saint John the Evangelist; St Mary, St John and St Thomas	52°38′40″N 0°21′55″E
Creake Abbey		chapel hospital founded before 1189 (during the reign of Henry II) by Lady Alice de Nerford and her husband Sir Robert who used the chapel to found a hospital; Augustinian Canons Regular founded 1206, the master becoming a canon, changing the hospital to a priory with the consent of the widowed Alice; hospital dedicated to St Bartholomew after(?)1217; raised to abbey status 1231 by Henry III; canons wiped out by plague 1506, abbot survived to 12 December 1506; passed to the Crown 1506; (EH)	The Priory Church of Saint Mary de Pratis ____________________; North Creake Abbey; Creek Abbey	52°55′14″N 0°45′34″E
Custhorpe Cell(?)		Augustinian Canons Regular cell(?) (Note: Custhorpe — given as a cell by F. A. Gasquet, English Monastic Life, (1924), p.313, possibly citing M. E. C. Walcott, English Minsters (1879), Volume 2, p.106) dependent on West Acre; possibly a chapel intermittently served by a canon		52°42′05″N 0°38′41″E
Docking Priory		Benedictine monks alien house: cell or grange dependent on Ivry-la-Bataille; founded 12th century; dissolved 1455; granted as a 'priory' to Eton College 1436? (Note: Docking — granted to Eton in 1436: Dugdale, (1486) Monasticon Anglicanum vi:)		52°53′34″N 0°36′53″E
East Dereham Monastery		Saxon nuns nunnery and probable minster founded before 743 by St Withburga; ?destroyed in raids by the Danes c.870; sole remains are a holy well, reputedly associated with the monastery		52°40′51″N 0°56′14″E
Field Dalling Grange		Savignac monks alien house founded 1138 by Maud de Harscolye: James de Sancto Hylario granted land to the abbey of the Holy Trinity, Savigny; Cistercian monks orders merged 17 September 1147; (referred to as a priory cell, but believed to be a grange); dissolved 1414; granted by the Crown to Epworth Priory; granted to the Spittle-on-the-Street, Lincolnshire; granted to the Carthusians of St. Anne's Priory, Coventry, Warwickshire (West Midlands); granted to the Carthusian priory of Mount Grace 1462; granted to Martyng Hastings and James Borne	Dallingfield Priory; Field-Dalling Priory; Fieldallyng Priory	52°54′17″N 0°59′09″E
Flitcham Priory		Augustinian Canons Regular founded c.1217 (early in the reign of Henry III) by Sir Robert Aguillon (granted to Dametta de Flitcham); in decay by 1528; dissolved 1538; granted to Edward Lord Clinton 1538/9; house built on site 16th century	St Mary ad Fontes	52°48′32″N 0°34′20″E
Gorleston Friary		Augustinian Friars (under the Limit of Cambridge) founded before 1267; William Woderove given as founder 14th century; dissolved 1538, surrendered to Richard Ingworth, Bishop of Dover		
Great Massingham Priory		Augustinian Canons Regular founded before/c.1260 probably by Nicholas le (/de) Syre (originally termed a hospital, with a prior as master); dilapidated 1475-6; refounded as a cell of West Acre; dissolved 1538; granted to Sir Thomas Gresham	St Mary and St Nicholas ____________________; Massingham Magna	52°46′30″N 0°39′43″E
Great Witchingham Grange		Cluniac monks alien house: dependent on Longueville; founded after 1093: manor and other endowments granted by Walter Giffard, 1st Earl of Buckingham; possibly directly supervised by monks from time-to-time dissolved after 1414		
Great Yarmouth — St Nicholas's Priory		Benedictine monks cell dependent on Norwich; founded 1101 by Herbert de Losinga, Bishop of Norwich; Church of St Nicholas was associated with the priory; dissolved 1539; granted to Norwich Cathedral; restored 1835; destroyed by bombing in World War II; restored, currently in parochial use as the Parish Church of St Nicholas; the conventual Great Hall currently in use as Priory School	The Priory Church of Saint Nicholas, Great Yarmouth;	52°36′39″N 1°43′38″E
Great Yarmouth Austin Friary		Augustinian Friars cell? under Gorleston founded 1339?: royal permission granted; existence purported by old tradition dissolution unknown (Note: Great Yarmouth — Messent, C.J.W., in Monastic Remains of Norfolk and Suffolk p.100, is dubious about the existence of such a cell)		52°35′11″N 1°43′29″E
Great Yarmouth Blackfriars		Dominican Friars (under the Visitation of Cambridge) founded before 1267 by Sir William Garbridge; inundated by the sea 1287, and sea wall constructed; church destroyed by fire 1525; dissolved 1538; granted to Richard Andrews and Sir Leonard Chamberlain.1542/3		52°36′01″N 1°43′43″E
Great Yarmouth Greyfriars		Franciscan Friars Minor, Conventual (under the Custody of Cambridge) founded after 1226(?)-1271 by Sir William Garbridge; dissolved 1538; granted to Sir Richard Williams, alias Cromwell 1541/2; leased 1582 as a lodging for important visitors, and part used by local civilian militia; site sold to John Woodroffe 1657; later divided and sold; monastic remains incorporated into 17th century and later buildings; remains of the cloister were opened up late 19th century, with other remains restored 1945 and thereafter		52°36′19″N 1°43′34″E
Great Yarmouth Whitefriars		Carmelite Friars founded before 1277 by Edward I; destroyed by fire 1 April 1509; dissolved 1538 by Richard Ingworth, Bishop of Dover; granted to Thomas Denton and Richard Nottingham 1544/5; house built on site 17th century	52°36′30″N 1°43′25″E	
Haddiscoe Preceptory		Knights Templar founded before 1218; dissolved 1308-12		52°30′58″N 1°35′41″E
Heacham Grange		Cluniac monks alien house: grange(?) dependent on Lewes, Sussex; founded before 1088: endowments including mansion and estates granted to Lewes by William de Warenne; cell purported to have existed (evidence disputed) — possibly directly supervised by monks from time-to-time; dissolution unknown		52°54′16″N 0°28′54″E
Hempton Priory		hospital founded before 1135 (during the reign of Henry I) by Roger de St Martin (St Martins), with Richard Ward (who became the first prior when the hospital became a priory); Augustinian Canons Regular founded before 1135; hospital continued to after 1200; dissolved 1536; granted to Sir William Fermer 1545/6	The Priory Church of Saint Stephen, Hempton ____________________; Fakenham Priory; Hampton Priory	52°49′25″N 0°50′34″E
Hickling Priory ^{#}		Augustinian Canons Regular founded 1185 by Theobald de Valentia, son of Robert de Valoines; dissolved 1536; granted to the Bishop of Norwich	The Priory Church of Saint Mary, Saint Augustine and All Saints, Hickling 1545/6	52°46′03″N 1°35′01″E
Hitcham Cell		Cluniac monks founded during the reign of William II by William Warren, Earl of Surrey; dissolved; granted to Thomas, Duke of Norfolk 1537/8		
Horsham St Faith Priory		Benedictine monks (community founded at Kirkscroft 1105); alien house: dependent on Conches; transferred here after 1105; became denizen: independent from 1390; dissolved 1536; granted to Sir Edward Elrington 1543/4	The Priory Church of Saint Faith, Horsham	52°41′17″N 1°16′39″E
Horstead Priory		Benedictine monks alien house: priory or grange? dependent on La Trinitè, Caen; founded c.1090 by William II to nunnery at Caen; nuns appear not to have resided here; probably run by a monk using the title 'prior' dissolved 1414; granted to King's College, Cambridge 1291	Horestead Grange; Horstead Priory	52°43′17″N 1°20′42″E
Ingham Priory^{+}		secular canons collegiate founded c.1355 by Sir Miles Stapleton who was granted licence to enlarge church 1355; Trinitarian Canons founded 1360 abandoned between 1534 and 1536; dissolved 1536; prospective purchaser falsely asserted the house to be of Crutched Friars; granted to the Bishop of Norwich 1544/5; The Swan Inn public house, adjacent to the church, also stands on the site of the priory	The Priory Church of the Holy Trinity and All Saints, Ingham	52°46′45″N 1°32′38″E
King's Lynn Benedictine Priory		Benedictine monks founded 1095; dissolved 1538; granted to the Dean and Chapter of Norwich; site of the prior's house consecrated and incorporated into St Margaret's churchyard early 17th century; demolished apart from small section incorporated into later building	The Priory & Parish Church of Saint Margaret with Saint Mary Magdalen and All the Virgin Saints, King's Lynn The Priory & Parish Church of Saint Margaret with St Nicholas, King's Lynn (from 1101)	52°45′05″N 0°23′43″E
King's Lynn Austin Friars		Augustinian Friars (under the Custody of Cambridge) founded before 1295; dissolved 30 September 1538; granted to John Eyer 1544/5		52°45′23″N 0°23′49″E
King's Lynn Blackfriars		Dominican Friars (under the Visitation of Cambridge) founded before 1256 by Thomas Gedney; dissolved 1539 (1538); granted to John Eyer 1544/5		52°45′13″N 0°23′59″E
King's Lynn Greyfriars		Franciscan Friars Minor, Conventual (under the Custody of Cambridge) founded c.1230, purportedly by Thomas Feltham; dissolved 1538		52°45′04″N 0°23′58″E
King's Lynn Sack Friary		Friars of the Sack founded before 1266; dissolved after 1307		52°44′59″N 0°23′50″E
King's Lynn Whitefriars		Carmelite Friars founded before c.1260, possibly by Lord Bardolph; dissolved 30 September 1538; granted to John Eyer	White Friars, King's Lynn	52°44′56″N 0°23′49″E
Kirkscroft Priory		Benedictine monks alien house: dependent on Conches; founded c.1105 by Robert FitzWalter and his wife Sybil; transferred to new site at Horsham St Faith shortly afterwards	The Blessed Virgin Mary	
Langley Abbey		Premonstratensian Canons daughter house of Alnwick, Northumberland; founded 1198 by Robert Fitz Roger; dissolved 1536; granted to John Berney 1546/7		52°34′20″N 1°29′08″E
Lessingham Priory		Benedictine monks alien house: cell or grange dependent on Bec-Hellouin founded c.1090; dissolved c.1414		52°48′04″N 1°32′49″E
Ling Priory		Benedictine nuns foundation unknown; dissolved c.1160		
Ludham, St Benet's Abbey		hermits founded c.800 by Saxon monks under Suneman (or Prince Horn); destroyed in raids by Danes 870 monks or secular canons collegiate rebuilt c.960 by Wulfric; Benedictine monks refounded by Cnut; never suppressed, granted to the Bishop of Norwich 1536; probably abandoned before 1539	St Benet of Holm Abbey; St Benet's of Hulme Abbey	52°41′09″N 1°31′30″E
Marham Abbey		Cistercian nuns founded 1249 (1251), endowed by the Countess of Arundel; dissolved 1536; granted to Sir Nicholas Hare and Robert Hare 1546/7	The Blessed Virgin Mary, St Barbara and St Edmund, Marham	52°39′33″N 0°31′22″E
Modeney Priory		Benedictine monks founded before 1291; dissolved c.1536; granted to Robert Hogan 1543/4	Modney Priory	52°32′24″N 0°22′06″E
Molycourt Priory		Benedictine monks foundation unknown (pre-Conquest); cell dependent on Ely; granted to Ely 1446; dissolved with Ely 1539; site partly occupied by farmhouse	St Mary Bello Loco ____________________; Mullicourt Priory	52°36′09″N 0°15′39″E
Mountjoy Priory		Benedictine monks cell dependent on Wymondham; founded after 1189; Augustinian Canons Regular granted to Augustinians after 1199 (early in the reign of John) by William de Gyney (Gisnetto/Gisneto); dissolved 1 April 1529 for Cardinal Wolsey's colleges	St Laurence St Mary the Virgin, St Michael and St Laurence ____________________; Monte Jovis Priory	52°43′31″N 1°11′40″E
Narford Cell		Augustinian Canons Regular purported cell dependent on West Acre; officiating in the Chapel of St Thomas a Becket		52°41′10″N 0°36′09″E
Newbridge Hermitage		hermit's chapel founded 1094 (Note: Newbridge — hermitage, cited by Cobbett)		
Normansburgh Priory		Augustinian Canons Regular founded c.1160 Cluniac monks alien house: cell dependent on Castle Acre; refounded c.1200; became denizen: independent from sometime between 1351 and 1374; dissolved 1537	The Priory Church of Saint Mary the Virgin and Saint John the Evangelist ____________________; Norman's Burrow Priory	52°46′50″N 0°48′03″E
Norwich Austin Friars		Augustinian Friars (under the Limit of Cambridge) founded after 1277 (apparently)/before 1289; dissolved 29 August 1538; granted to Sir Thomas Henneage and William Lord Willoughby 1548/9		52°37′35″N 1°18′02″E
Norwich Blackfriars, earlier site		Dominican Friars (under the Visitation of Cambridge) founded 1226 by Sir Thomas Gelham; transferred to new site (see immediately below) 1307; property retained by friars; friars retired from new site when destroyed by fire 1413; returned to St Andrew's Hall 1449	Black Hall; Old House	52°38′02″N 1°17′45″E
Blackfriars, Norwich		Dominican Friars (community founded at earlier site (see immediately above ) 1226); licence for acquisition of site granted by Edward II by 1307; transferred here before 1307 destroyed by fire 1413; friars retired to Old Hall (see above); rebuilt; friars returned 1449; dissolved 1538; granted to the Mayor and citizens of Norwich 1540/1; now Blackfriars Hall	52°38′00″N 1°17′41″E	
Norwich, Friary de Domina		Friars of St Mary (actually Pied Friars) founded before c.1290 from a legacy granted by Roger de Tybenham; founded before 1274-5; community perished in the Black Death 1349, house becoming private property		52°37′29″N 1°18′05″E
Norwich Friars of the Sack		Friars of the Sack founded c.1258: site secured for the friars in the parish of St Peter Hungate; dissolved before 1307; granted to Dominicans		
Norwich Greyfriars		Franciscan Friars Minor, Conventual (under the Custody of Cambridge) founded 1226 by John de Hastingford in a house in Ciningsford (modern Conisford); dissolved 1538		52°37′45″N 1°17′58″E
Norwich Pied Friars		Pied Friars founded before 1290; dissolved c.1307; granted to the hospital of Beck in Billingford and converted into a chantry and collegiate 14th century which continued until the dissolution		52°37′38″N 1°17′58″E
Norwich Priory		Benedictine nuns founded between 1100 and 1135 (during the reign of Henry I); transferred c.1146 to Carrow	St Mary and St John	
White Friars, Norwich		Carmelite Friars founded 1256 by Philip Cougate of Norwich; dissolved 1538; granted to Richard Andrews and Leonard Chamberlain 1542/3; few visible remains		52°38′09″N 1°18′04″E
Great Hospital, Norwich; St Giles Hospital ^		hospital founded 1249; Augustinian Canons Regular from 1310 the master and brothers wore the Austin canons' habit; much of the medieval fabric survives in the establishment which has been in continual use since foundation	The Great Hospital; Hospital of St Giles	52°37′58″N 1°18′16″E
St Leonard's Priory, Norwich		Benedictine monks founded c.1095 (1096), built by Herbert Losinga, Bishop of Norwich for accommodation of monks whilst the Cathedral and Priory were being constructed; >continued as a cell of Norwich Cathedral 1101; dissolved 1539	The Priory Church of Saint Leonard, Norwich	52°37′52″N 1°18′43″E
Norwich — St William's Cell		Benedictine monks cell dependent on Norwich (Note: Norwich St William's — M. E. C. Walcott, English Minsters (1879), Volume 2, p.180, ref R. C. Taylor, Index Monasticus, (1821), p.8); founded before(?)1150;	St Catherine St William	
Norwich Cathedral Priory ^{+}		Benedictine monks founded 1096-1101 by Bishop Herbert Losinga; dissolved 1539; in use as episcopal diocesan cathedral 1096-present	The Cathedral and Priory Church of the Holy and Undivided Trinity, Norwich	52°37′55″N 1°18′04″E
Norwich, Christ Church Priory		Benedictine monks foundation unknown (before 1076) by Ingulf; (Note: "Among the monks, which Ingulph found in his church of Crowaland A.D. 1076. there were fourteen from Christ Church in Norwich; of which Religious house nothing else hath yet occurr'd" — T. Tanner (1744 ed.) Notitia Monastica p.338) dissolved before 1076(?)		52°37′26″N 1°17′36″E
Old Buckenham Priory		Augustinian Canons Regular founded c.1146 by William de Albini (William d'Aubigny), Earl of Chichester; dissolved September 1536; granted to Sir Thomas Lovell	The Priory Church of Saint Mary, Saint James and All Saints, Buckenham ____________________; Oldbuckenham Priory; Buckenham Priory	52°29′28″N 1°02′58″E
Pentney Priory		Augustinian Canons Regular founded c.1130 (or during the reign of William the Conqueror) by Robert de Vallileus; annexed by Wormegay 1468; dissolved 1537; granted to Thomas Mildmay 1538/9; remains incorporated into Abbey Farm and outbuildings which now occupy the site		52°40′45″N 0°30′57″E; 52°40′49″N 0°30′53″E
Peterstone Priory		Augustinian Canons Regular founded before 1200; flooded 1378 and 1387; dilapidated; annexed to Walsingham 1449, ceasing to function as a priory; granted 1550/1 to ?; remains incorporated into Peterstone farmhouse	St Peter's Priory and Hospital	52°57′07″N 0°46′11″E
Rudham Priory		Augustinian Canons Regular founded c.1140 by William Cheney; transferred to Coxford 1216	St Mary ____________________; East Rudham Priory	52°49′16″N 0°42′38″E
Sheringham Cell		Augustinian Canons Regular — Arroasian cell dependent on Notley Abbey, Buckinghamshire; founded before 1164; dissolved before 1345(?)		
Shouldham Priory		Gilbertine Canons and nuns — double house founded after 1193 by Geoffrey Fitx Peters (Jeffery Fitz Piers) (later Earl of Essex); dissolved 15 October 1538; granted to Thomas Mildmay 1553; standing remains demolished c.1831; farmhouse and garden occupy the site	The Priory Church of the Holy Cross and the Blessed Virgin Mary, Shouldham	52°39′23″N 0°28′56″E
Slevesholm Priory ^{#}		Cluniac monks alien house: dependent on Castle Acre; founded before 1290, either granted by William de Warenne in 1222-6 or established during the reign of Stephen; became denizen: independent from between 1351 and 1374; dissolved 1537	The Blessed Virgin Mary and St Giles; Slevesholm Priory	52°32′07″N 0°30′31″E
Sporle Priory		Benedictine monks alien house: cell dependent on St Florent-de-Saumur; founded before 1123; church of St Mary and other endowments granted by Alan son of Flaald: papal confirmation 1123; vacant for a time after the Black Death; dissolved c.1414; granted to Eaton College 1440 (1558/9, according to Cobbett)		52°40′08″N 0°44′05″E
Stove Cell		Cluniac monks alleged cell dependent on Castle Acre, no record of monks in residence		
Thetford Austin Friars ^{#}		Augustinian Friars (under the Limit of Cambridge) founded c.1387 by John of Gaunt, Duke of Lancaster, who made a benefaction: land granted by Sir Thomas Morley and Simon Barbour, apparently established 1389; dissolved September 1538; granted to Sir Richard Fulmerestoone 1540/1; nothing of the founded currently visible, remains of the foundations are believed to exist beneath the ground southeast of Thetford castle		52°24′37″N 0°45′21″E
Thetford Blackfriars		episcopal diocesan cathedral for the diocese of East Anglia founded 1072; see transferred to Norwich 9 April 1094-1096; (converted for use as Cluniac Priory until 1114 (v. Thetford Priory, earlier site, infra), after which it lain waste for over 200 years); Dominican Friars (under the Visitation of Cambridge) founded 1335: church of St Mary the Great granted by Henry, Earl of Lancaster, confirmed by the King 20 July 1335; the Church of the Holy Trinity (founded 1072) made the friary church; dissolved 1538; remains of friary church, now incorporated into school buildings		52°24′49″N 0°44′40″E
Thetford — Holy Sepulchre Priory		Augustinian Canons Regular — Holy Sepulchre founded after 1139 by William de Warenne, Earl of Surrey on land granted by King Stephen; Augustinian Canons Regular (independent) before c.1260; dissolved 1536	The Canon's Priory; The Canons	52°24′49″N 0°44′26″E
Thetford Priory, earlier site		episcopal diocesan cathedral for East Anglia founded 1072; see transferred to Norwich 9 April 1094-1096; Cluniac monks alien house: dependent on Lewes, Sussex; founded 1103-4, built by Robert Bigot; transferred to new site (see immediately below) 1114; site granted to Dominican Friars 1335 (v. Thetford Blackfriars, supra)		52°24′49″N 0°44′40″E
Thetford Priory		Cluniac monks alien house: dependent on Lewes, Sussex; (community founded at earlier site (see immediately above) 1103-4); transferred here 1114; became denizen: independent from 1376; dissolved 16 February 1540; granted to Thomas, Duke of Norfolk 1540/1; (EH)	St Mary	52°25′00″N 0°44′33″E
Thetford — St George's Priory		Benedictine monks cell dependent on Bury St Edmunds; founded after 1020 (during the reign of Cnut) by Abbot Uvius; abandoned 1160; Benedictine nuns — from Ling refounded c.1160 by Abbot Hugh de Norwold; dissolved February 1537; granted to Richard Fulmerstone Esq. 1538/9	The Priory Church of Saint George, Thetford	52°24′21″N 0°45′08″E
Toft Monks Priory ^{#}		Benedictine monks alien house: dependent on St-Pierre, Preaux; founded between 1087 and 1100 (during the reign of William II) Church of St Margaret and its endowments granted to the Abbey of St-Pierre, Preaux dissolved 1414; granted to Witham, Somerset; transferred to King's College, Cambridge 1462		52°29′57″N 1°33′50″E
Walsingham Friary		Franciscan Friars (under the Custody of Cambridge) founded 1 February 1347 by Elizabeth de Burgh (Burgo), Countess of Clare: licence granted by Edward III; dissolved 1538; granted to John Eyer 1544/5	Walsginham Greyfriars	52°53′31″N 0°52′19″E
Walsingham Priory		secular chapel founded before 1066; Augustinian Canons Regular founded 1153 by Geoffrey de Favarches (or the widow of Richoldis de Favarches) incorporating the Chapel of Our Lady of Walsingham (founded before 1066); dissolved 1538; granted to Thomas Sidney 1539/40; now in private ownership with public access	Little Walsingham Priory	52°53′37″N 0°52′31″E
Welle Priory, in Gayton		Benedictine monks alien house: cell dependent on St-Etienne, Caen; founded c.1081 (during the reign of William the Conqueror) by William de Streis, who granted the manor of Well and the church of Gayton; united with Panfield c.1275; dissolved 1415; granted to St Stephen's, Westminster 1469; granted to the Bishops of Ely 1548/9; site currently occupied by house named 'Well Hall' built on site 18th century (c.1700)	Well Hall Priory; Welles Priory	52°45′09″N 0°33′19″E
Wendling Abbey		Premonstratensian Canons daughter house of Langley; founded c.1267 by Rev. William of Wendling; due to be suppressed 1528 for Wolsey's Colleges, but delayed; dissolved 1536-7; granted to Edward Dyer and H. Cressener 1573/4	The Abbey Church of the Blessed Virgin Mary, Wendling	52°40′42″N 0°52′01″E
St Winwaloe's Priory		Benedictine monks alien house: cell dependent on Montreuil; founded before 1199 by the Earl of Clare; dissolved c.1321: sold 1321; granted to West Dereham 1336; granted to Thomas Guibon and William Mynn; conventual remains appear to be incorporated into Winnold House built on site	St Winwaloe ____________________; Wirham Priory	52°36′26″N 0°29′28″E
West Acre Priory		Black canons probably founded before 1100 (during the reign of William II) by Oliver, parish priest; brothers joined the Augustinian order c.1135 (possibly late in the reign of Henry I); Augustinian Canons Regular transferred c.1135; dissolved 15 January 1538; granted to Thomas Gresham 1553	The Priory Church of Saint Mary and All Saints, West Acre; Westacre Priory	52°42′11″N 0°38′01″E
West Dereham Abbey		Premonstratensian Canons — from Welbeck, Nottinghamshire daughter house of Welbeck; founded 1188 by Hubert Walter, Dean of York (later Bishop of Salisbury); dissolved 1539; granted to Thomas Dereham 1539/40	The Abbey Church of the Blessed Virgin Mary	52°34′41″N 0°27′01″E
Weybourne Priory		Augustine Canons Regular dependent on West Acre; founded 1199 by Sir Ralph Mainwaring (Meyngaryn); independent from 1314; dissolved 1536; granted to Richard Heydon 1545/6	The Priory Church of Saint Mary and All Saints, Weybourne ____________________; Waburn Priory	52°56′37″N 1°08′29″E
Weybridge Priory		Augustinian Canons Regular priory cell; founded 1272 (before 1225) by Hugh Bigod, Earl of Norfolk; dissolved 1536; granted to Richard Fulmerstone 1538/9	St Mary	52°38′52″N 1°34′05″E
Witchingham Priory		Cluniac monks alien house: cell or grange dependent on Longueville; founded c.1093 by Walter Giffard, 1st Earl of Buckingham who granted churches, manors and land to the priory of St Faith, Longueville, Rouen; dissolved 1414, reverting to the Crown; granted to New College, Oxford 1460		52°44′10″N 1°05′59″E
Wormegay Priory ^{$}		Augustinian Canons Regular founded 1189-99 (during the reign of Richard I or of John) by William de Warenne; cell dependent on Pentney 1468; dissolved 1537; granted to the Bishop of Norwich 1550/1	The Priory Church of the Blessed Virgin Mary, the Holy Cross and Saint John the Evangelist, Wormegay	52°41′12″N 0°26′36″E
Wretham Grange		Benedictine monks alien house: grange(?) dependent on Conches; founded c.1260(?): granted by Roger de Tony, son of Radulph — charter witnessed by Richard de Rom; a parcel of Wootton Wawen, with possibly a single monk, if any; dissolution unknown; church was rebuilt mid-14th and 15th century granted to Sir Roland Lenthall for life 1415; possessed by the Provost and Fellows of King's College, Cambridge 1443; church in parochial use after suppression; abandoned 1793; now in ruins	West Wretham Grange; Werteham Grange	52°29′17″N 0°47′49″E
Wymondham Abbey ^{+}		Benedictine monks dependent on St Albans, Hertfordshire; priory founded 1107 (in the tenure of Abbot Richard de Albini) by William de Albini: charter witnessed by Roger Bigod; raised to abbey status 1449; dissolved 1538; granted to Sir William Hadden 1545/6; church, partly ruined, now in parochial use	The Abbey Church of Saint Mary the Virgin, Wymondham ____________________; Wymondham Priory	52°34′14″N 1°06′27″E

== See also ==
- List of monastic houses in England
