= Great Yarmouth Friary =

Great Yarmouth Friary may refer to:

- Great Yarmouth Black Friary (Dominican)
- Great Yarmouth Grey Friary (Franciscan Friars Minor, Conventual)
- Great Yarmouth Carmelite Friary (White Friars)
