= Edward Frank Gillett =

British artist

- Born: 23 July 1874; Worlingham, Suffolk, United Kingdom
- Died: 1 May 1927 (aged 52)
- Education: Gresham's School
- Known for: Artist and illustrator
- Spouse(s): Elsie Joanne Bastard, Margaret Mickelburgh

Edward Frank Gillett (23 July 1874 – 1 May 1927), often credited as Frank Gillett, was a British artist and illustrator. He worked in pen and ink, pastel, watercolour, and oil. Though he died in 1927, two of his works were in the art competition in the 1928 Summer Olympics.

== Early life ==
Gillett was born in Worlingham, Suffolk, and educated at Gresham's School, Norfolk.

== Career ==
Having found a career as a clerk in 1891, Gillett lived in Lambeth, London. He decided to focus on his art from 1896. Gillett submitted cartoons to the periodical Fun before starting work full time as an illustrator at The Daily Graphic from 1898. He worked there until 1908, transferring to Black and White and then to Illustrated Sporting and Dramatic News, contributing to them between 1910 and 1923. Gillett was a member of London's Langham Sketch Club and in 1909 became an elected member of the Royal Institute of Painters in Water Colours. He left London in 1916, moving to the Mickelburgh family farm in Aldeby, Norfolk and later to Beccles.

Gillett worked in pen and ink, pastel, watercolour, and oil and was noted as a skillful caricaturist. He was inspired by Norfolk's rural life and his work often involved sport, particularly fox-hunting and hare-coursing. His work has been exhibited by the Royal Academy of Arts and the Walker Art Gallery and is held by the British Museum and the Victoria and Albert Museum. Gillett also illustrated 25 reissues of works by G. A. Henty as well as several books by Robert Louis Stevenson and Percy F. Westerman.

Two of Gillett's works, La Finale and Contre l'horizon, were submitted into the Mixed Painting, Drawings And Water Colours category at the 1928 Summer Olympics. He did not win a medal but his entry makes him one of only a small number of posthumous Olympians and the only one to represent Great Britain.

== Personal life ==
Gillett married Elsie Joanne Bastard in 1903 but was widowed in 1912. He remarried in Aldeby two years later to Margaret Mickelburgh.
