= All Saints Church, Weybourne =

All Saints' Church, Weybourne
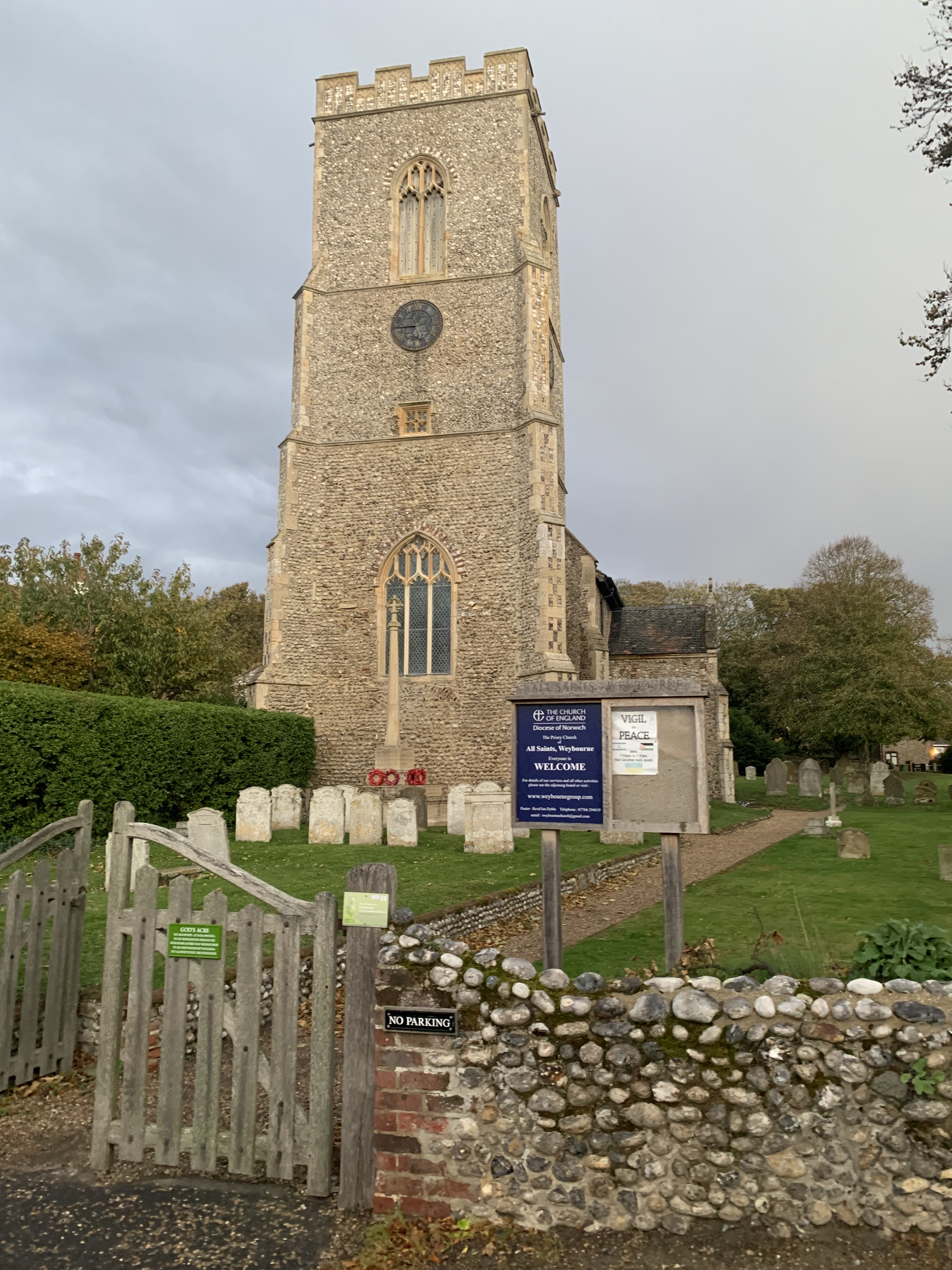
- All Saints' Church, Weybourne
- All Saints' Church, Weybourne
- 52.9431°N 1.1416°E
- Location: The Street, Weybourne, Norfolk
- Country: England
- Denomination: Church of England

History
- Status: Parish church
- Dedication: All Saints

Architecture
- Functional status: Active

Administration
- Diocese: Norwich
- Archdeaconry: Lynn
- Deanery: Holt
- Parish: Weybourne

All Saints' Church, Weybourne is the parish church of the village of Weybourne in North Norfolk, England. The building is principally medieval in origin, though built on Saxon foundations, and remains today as the surviving element of Weybourne Priory, a medieval Augustinian priory complex dissolved during the Reformation, the ruins of which still stand adjacent to the church. All Saints' Church is a Grade II* listed building.

== History ==
=== Saxon Origins ===
The church of All Saints, Weybourne has Saxon origins; the present medieval structure having built upon an earlier late Saxon church. The remains of the original Saxon church tower can still be seen to the north of the modern chancel, part of the ruins of Weybourne Priory.

=== Medieval era and Reformation ===
The present parish church was originally part of Weybourne Priory, an Augustinian monastic house founded c.1200 by Sir Ralph Mainwaring and his wife Amicia. Weybourne Priory was initially subordinate to West Acre Priory, near Swaffham. The west tower of the parish church was added in the 15th century, built with traditional East Anglian brick and flint. Weybourne Priory was one of the first religious houses to be dissolved by Henry VIII; it surrendered to the king in 1536. The last prior, Thomas Bulman, was pensioned off, and the priory church became the parish church of Weybourne.

=== 19th Century ===
All Saints' church was altered and repaired over subsequent centuries. Notable restoration work was carried out in the 19th century, including 1886 additions such as the north aisle and vestry. Further refurbishments of the interior were recorded in the late 19th and early 20th centuries.

== Architecture and fittings ==
All Saints is constructed in local flint with stone dressings, with a mixture of medieval and later features. The churchyard contains a First World War/Second World War memorial cross, listed separately as a Grade II structure.

== All Saints Weybourne Today ==
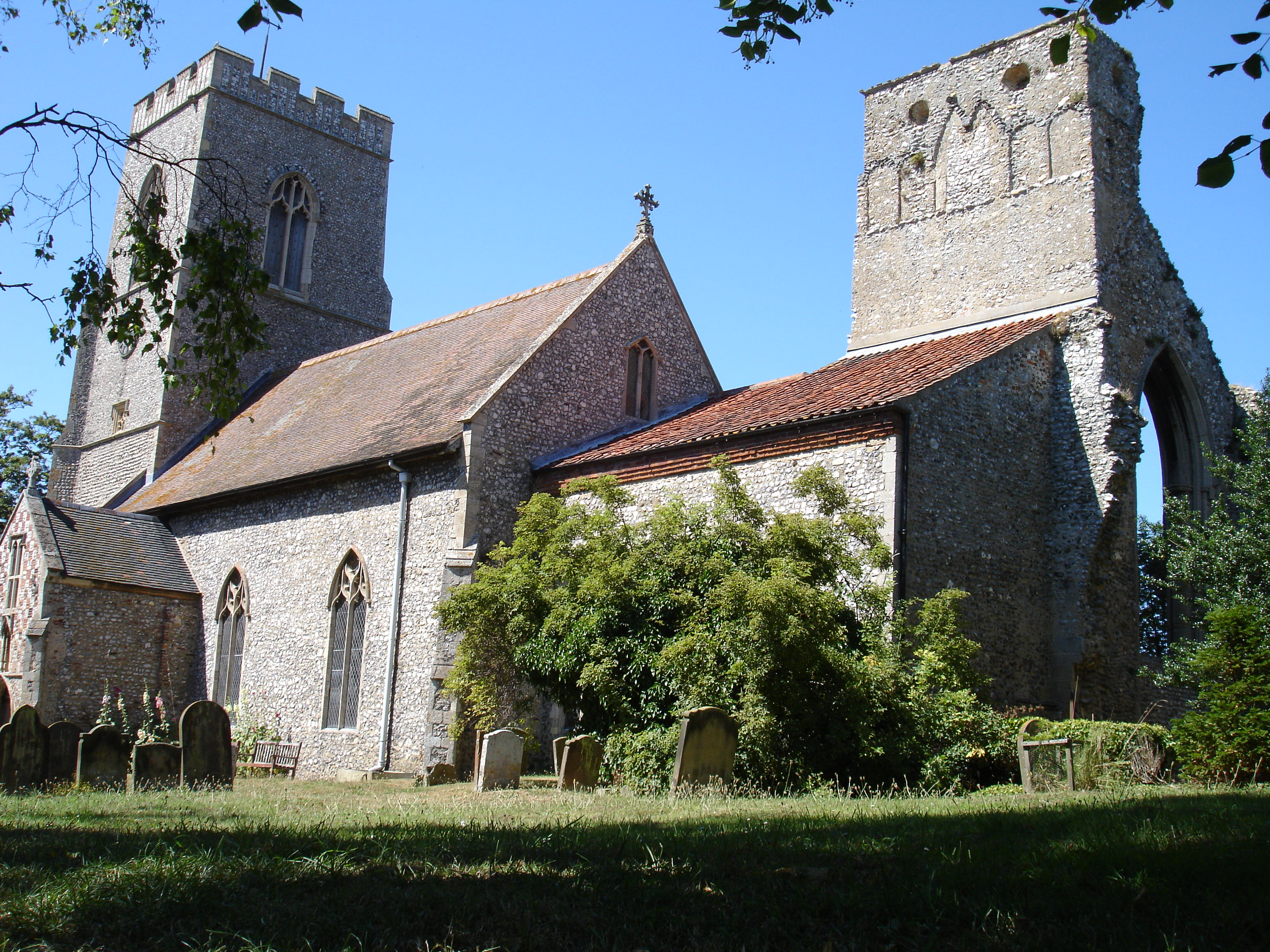
The ruins of Weybourne Priory, adjacent to All Saints' Church

On 4 October 1960 All Saints Weybourne became a Grade II* listed building. It remains an active Church of England parish church and is part of the local benefice/group of churches serving communities on the North Norfolk coast. Regular services and community events are held and the church is open to visitors during normal visiting hours. The remains of Weybourne Priory can still be seen, including the Saxon tower, adjacent to the church

== See also ==
- Weybourne
- Weybourne Priory
