= Weybourne Priory =

Monastery in Weybourne, Norfolk, England

Coordinates: 52.9431°N 1.1416°E

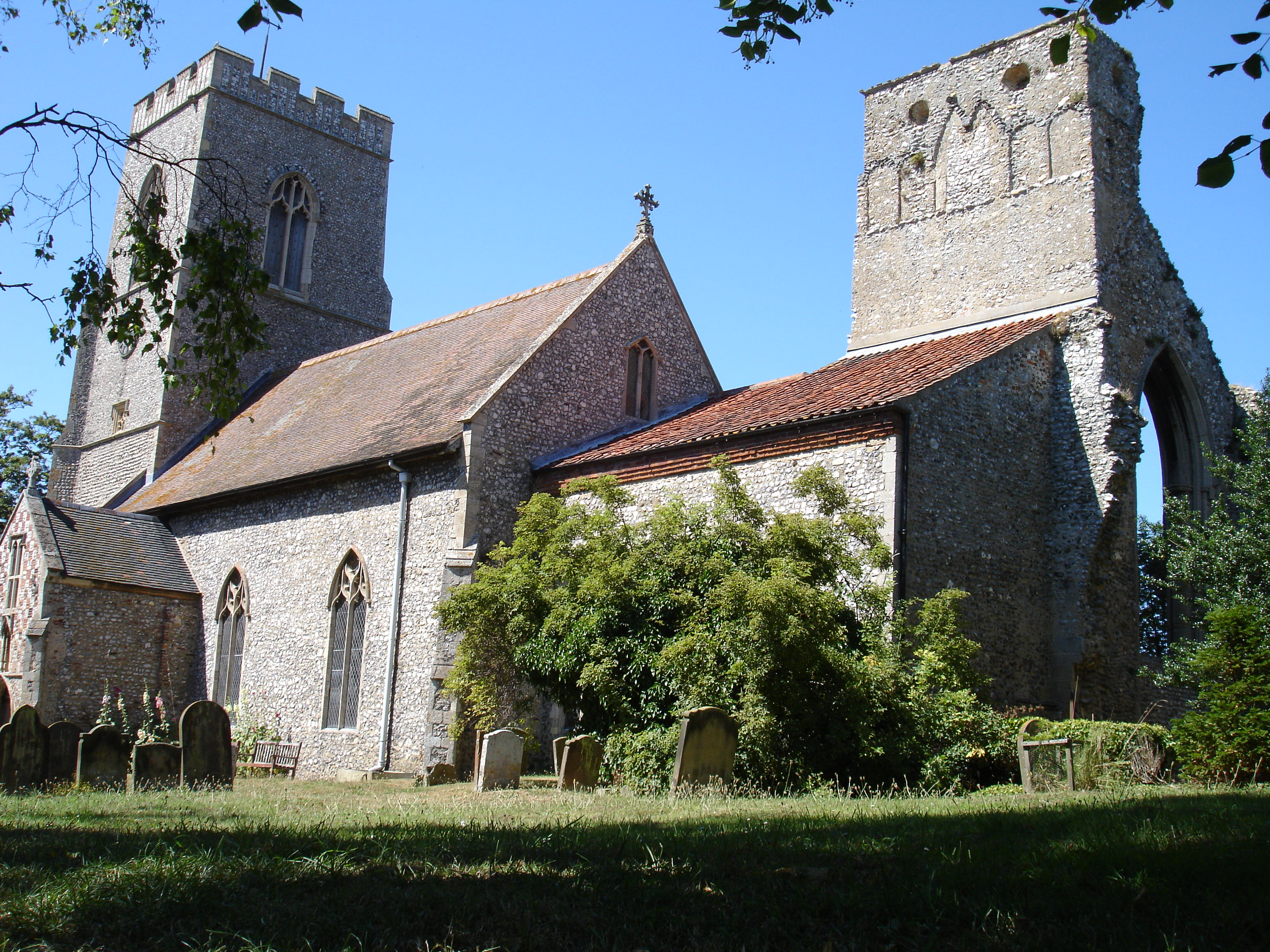
Weybourne Priory (right) and All Saints' Church

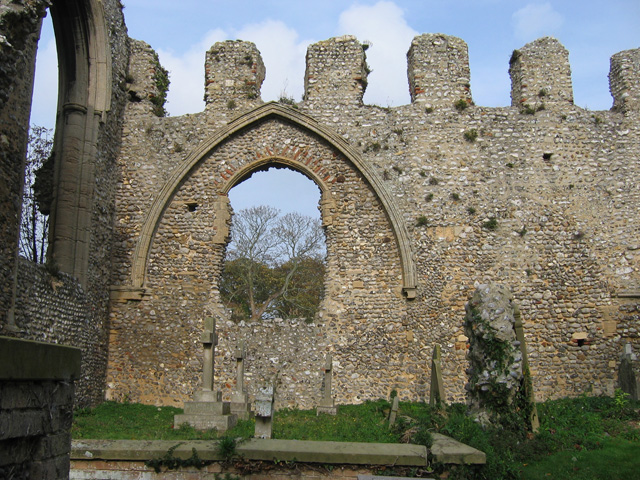
Priory church ruins

Weybourne Priory was a small Augustinian medieval monastic house in Weybourne, Norfolk, England. Its ruins, including a Saxon tower, lie adjacent to the parish church of All Saints Church, Weybourne.

== History ==
Weybourne Priory was founded around 1200 AD by Sir Ralph de Meyngaren (Mainwearing). It was at first subordinate to West Acre Priory but independent from 1314. By 1494 only one prior and three canons lived there. At a visitation in 1514, there was only the prior and one canon.

Weybourne Priory was one of the first religious houses to fall during the Reformation and was dissolved in 1536. Thomas Bulman, the prior, obtained a pension of £4; he was presented to the Norfolk rectory of Egmere in 1543. After its suppression, the priory was granted to John Gresham.

== Weybourne Priory Today ==
The standing remains of the priory are Grade I listed and the site is a Scheduled Ancient Monument.

== See also ==
- List of monastic houses in Norfolk
- List of monastic houses in England
