= Slevesholm Priory =

Cluniac priory in Norfolk, England

Coordinates: 52.5353451°N 0.5086863°E

- Interactive map of Slevesholm Priory

Monastery information
- Order: Cluniac
- Established: 1222-6; During the reign of king Stephen (1135–1154)
- Disestablished: 1537

Site
- Location: Methwold, Norfolk, England
- Grid reference: TL7025096010
- Public access: private

Slevesholm Priory was a Cluniac priory in the civil parish of Methwold, Norfolk, England, that was dedicated to St. Mary and St. Giles. A cell of the Castle Acre Priory, Slevesholm Priory was either granted by William de Warenne, 5th Earl of Surrey between 1222-6 or established during the reign of king Stephen (1135–1154), and dissolved in 1537 during the dissolution of the monasteries. There are no extant remains of the priory; Historic England undertook field research in 1976 and remarked: "There are no physical remains of this [priory] at the formerly published site which is now under plough; farm workers questioned had no knowledge of early finds or foundations. [There is] impression of early quarrying [while] no recognisable pattern is evident and there is no surface trace of building material."

Upon its dissolution it was granted to the Mundefords of Feltwell. Francis Blomefield in his An Essay Towards a Topographical History of the County of Norfolk (volume 2, 1805) writes the following succession of owners: "Francis, son of Osbert Mundeford, had livery of it in the 23d of Elizabeth [1581]. In 1600, Edmund Mundeford held it. After this we find it possessed by Captain Smith of Croxton, who conveyed it to Edward-Saunders Seabright; and Sir Thomas Seabright, Bart. died possessed of it in 1736."

== See also ==
- List of monastic houses in Norfolk
