= Blackborough Priory =

Monastic house in Norfolk, England

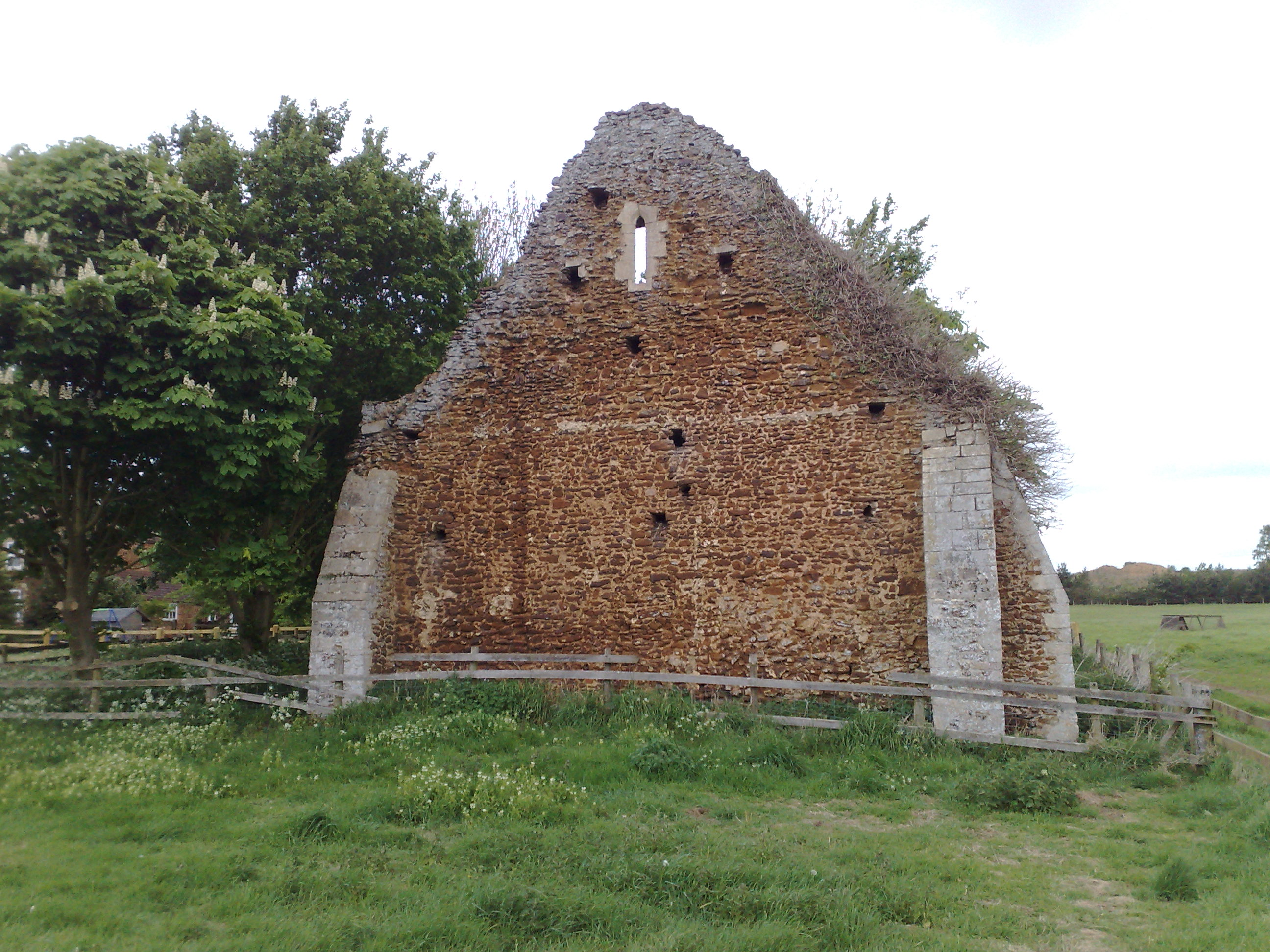
- Blackborough Priory ruins
- Interactive map of Blackborough Priory

Monastery information
- Other names: Priory of St. Mary and St. Catherine
- Established: 1150
- Disestablished: 1537
- Dedication: Blessed Virgin and St Catherine

People
- Founders: Roger de Scales and Muriel de Scales (née Lisewis)

Architecture
- Completed date: 1150

Site
- Location: Blackborough End, King's Lynn, Norfolk, England
- Coordinates: 52.698471°N 0.475943°E
- Grid reference: TF67401407
- Visible remains: South wall of the church
- Public access: By appointment only (with Heathlands Farm)

Blackborough Priory was a Benedictine monastic house in Norfolk, England, about 5 miles or 8 km south east of King's Lynn. The Ordnance Survey map shows the remains of fishponds nearby, which may have been for the use of the monastery.

== History ==
The priory was founded in 1150 by Roger de Scales and his wife Muriel, and was intended for the use of monks. Later, both nuns and monks were allowed in the priory. By 1200 the priory was dedicated to the sole use of Benedictine nuns. The nunnery operated until the Dissolution of the Monasteries in 1537. Between 1200 and 1537 the priory had nineteen prioresses. The first was Avelina and the last was Elizabeth Dawney. Today, the site of the priory is a cattle farm.

== Burials ==
- Robert Scales, 1st Baron Scales and his wife Isabell de Burnell de Scales
- Robert Scales, 3rd Baron Scales
- Roger Scales, 4th Baron Scales
- Robert Scales, 5th Baron Scales

== See also ==
- List of monastic houses in Norfolk
