= Horsham St Faith Priory =

Monastery in Norfolk, England

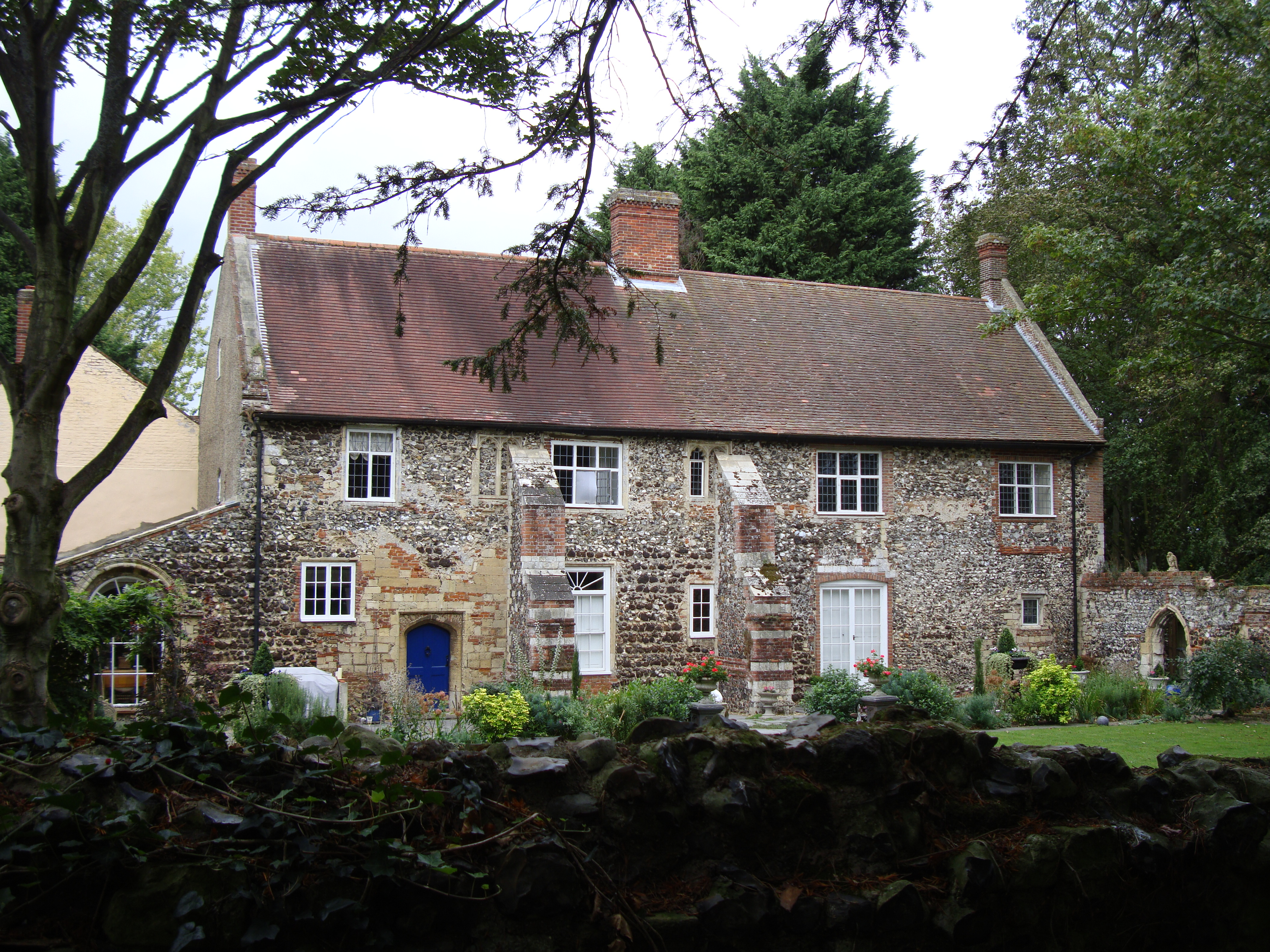
Extant remains of St Faith's Priory: the former refectory incorporated into a private residence

St Faith's Priory, Horsham, otherwise Horsham St Faith Priory, was a Benedictine monastery in Horsham St Faith, Norfolk, England.

== History ==
The monastery was founded at Kirkscroft in Horsford in 1105 by Robert Fitz-Walter and Sybil his wife, daughter and heiress of Ralph de Cheney, as a dependent priory of Conques Abbey in Midi-Pyrénées in France, and, like the abbey, dedicated to Saint Faith. It was thus an alien priory. The site in Horsford proved unsatisfactory, and the foundation moved to Horsham instead. The priory was endowed with income from an unusually high number of churches (23 in Norfolk, 14 in Suffolk, and one in London).

In 1390, the prior and the 8 monks that formed the then community were granted denization, and the priory from that time forwards was independent of Conques and regarded as an English house. For this reason, it was not affected by the Act of 1414 that enabled Henry V to confiscate the alien priories, but survived until the Dissolution of the Monasteries in 1536.

== Description ==
The church and other buildings are no longer extant, but the refectory (or frater) was converted into a house and survives as Abbey Farmhouse.

== See also ==
- List of monastic houses in Norfolk
