= Blackfriars, King's Lynn =

Dominican priory in Norfolk, 1250s–1538

Blackfriars was a priory of the Order of Preachers (Dominican Friars) in King's Lynn, Norfolk, England, established in the 1250s and dissolved in 1538. The name Blackfriars comes from the black cappa (cloak) and hood Dominican Friars wear over their white habits during the winter and when outside the cloister.

== The priory ==
=== Establishment, site, and governance ===
A priory was established on Market Street for the Blackfriars sometime between 1254 and 1256 by founding benefactor Thomas Gedney dedicated to St Dominic. It was part of the wave of new mendicant monastic houses established across Europe during 13th Century, one of several in Lynn. These included the Franciscan Friary or Greyfriars (founded c 1230 - see Greyfriars, King's Lynn), the Carmelite Priory or Whitefriars (founded sometime before 1260), and the Augustinian Priory or Austinfriars (founded sometime before 1295). These groups sought to bring the monastic example to the urban poor, partly by observing the Liturgy of the Hours and monastic community life in city convents, but also by providing religious ministry, education, and medical and pastoral care to growing urban populations. The Blackfriars (also called Friars Preachers) were and continue to be focused on prayer and liturgy, academic scholarship, preaching, teaching, and pastoral and charity work in urban areas. Lynn Blackfriars was a relatively early house of the English Dominican Province, established around forty years after the order's formation and thirty five years after the friars first came to Britain.

The Priory was situated in the east of King's Lynn north of Clough Lane and south of Old Market Street, around the present Blackfriars Street. Its buildings consisted of a priory church (also dedicated to St Dominic) and a quadrangle cloister containing at least a refectory and a dormitory, and probably a chapter house, a library, a scriptorium and other monastic living facilities. The priory church, like All Saints' Church in South Lynn, had an anchorage, an anchorite's cell built in the wall of the church with a view of the high altar. In addition to the cloister quad there was a second courtyard consisting of a gatehouse opening onto what is now Paradise Row, a porter's lodge, and other ancillary buildings. There also at least one burial ground (the site of the Blackfriars Street Baptist Church). By the year 1272 the complex was large enough to house 40 friars, and there were as many as 45 in residence by 1328. Like all Dominican communities its members followed the Rule of St Augustine, and were governed by the Prior elected by the community, the community chapter, and the wider Province. Lynn was under the visitation of Cambridge Blackfriars.

=== History before dissolution ===
The history of the priory is traceable through surviving records of donations, burials, chapter meetings, certain events like a major fire, and a large number of archaeological remains.

There were number of recorded royal benefactions to the house. Edward I was responsible for several, first in 1272 while he was nearby at Gaywood (13s. then 4d. for a day's food, and also 12s. for another days food), again in the year 1300 while visiting Lynn itself, and in 1304 (of 20 Marks) for the expenses of hosting a provincial chapter. In 1326 Edward II paid for a feast for the friars while visiting Lynn. In 1328 Edward III made a donation of 14s, 8d while visiting Lynn and again in 1344 and 1365 (£15 and £10) for provincial chapter expenses.

There are also records for many donations and bequests from local institutions and individuals. In 1285 John de St Omer, the mayor of Lynn, gave the friars 11 shillings worth of wine for their patronal feast (kept the 4 August 1285). At some point one William Berdolf gave the friars a spring called Brookwell nearly 4 miles away at Middleton - from which they engineered a supply of fresh water to the priory. During the 14th century the priory site was enlarged. Throughout the 14th and 15th centuries the donations to all of King's Lynn's mendicant houses were considerable, but Blackfriars recorded higher incomes than the other two.

The English Dominican Province held a number of their provincial chapters at the Lynn Priory - in 1304, 1344, and 1365.

During the late 15th century a major fire caused significant damage to parts of the conventual buildings in 1468. On 24 June 1476 the Master of the Order of Preachers confirmed the right of the Prior of Lynn to issue an Indulgence to all those who donated to the restoration fund.

=== List of known priors ===
The following priors (superiors) of St Dominic's Priory King's Lynn are listed in the 1906 work ‘A History of the County of Norfolk’

- Fr William de Bagthorpe O.P. 1393
- Fr John Braynes O.P. 1488
- William Videnhus O.P. 1497
- Thomas Lovell O.P. 1535

== Dissolution ==
In 1535 the house was the subject of a visitation report which recorded its assets and income. The priory was formally surrendered by the last Prior Thomas Lovell and dissolved 1538. The exact date of the surrender was not recorded in the written surrender but does retain Lovell's signature.

The Blackfriars estate (along with two other mendicant Houses in King's Lynn, Austinfriars and Greyfriars) was granted by Henry VIII to John Eyre, one of his auditors or receivers. Eyre obtained a large share of monastic lands, including much of the great abbey of Bury St Edmunds.

St Dominic's Church disappeared during the reformation but many of the conventual buildings survived well into the 19th century.

== The site today ==
Surviving priory structures such as the gatehouse, the porters lodge, and remaining parts of the cloister were dismantled in 1845. The whole site was levelled for rebuilding by 1852 leaving no visible remains. Much of the stone was reused in new building projects in the vicinity some of which survives. There is a Blackfriars Street running through what was once part of the priory site and a nearby Blackfriars Road. The site is now occupied by a variety of Victorian and 20th-century commercial and residential property, the 1841 Baptist Chapel, and the St James Swimming Baths. Much of it is also used for car parking.

=== Archaeology ===
The first recorded archeological discoveries were made in 1841, a group of stone coffins dug up during the construction of the Blackfriars Street Baptist Church. A witness recorded the event thus: 'those dead whose grand stone coffins... [I] saw dug up, placed with their contents to the view of the crowd, and then broken up and their skeletons thrown again in the earth.’ After the site was levelled in the early 1850s two broken stone preaching crosses were discovered now held nearby in Lynn Museum. Numerous discoveries relating to the priory have been made during building works and other excavations (in 1954, 1966, 1980, 2005, and 2008) many of which are in Lynn Museum.

== Sources ==
- Norfolk County Council Heritage Departments article on the archaeological record of the site of King's Lynn Blackfriars: https://www.heritage.norfolk.gov.uk/record-details?MNF1176-Site-of-Dominican-Friary&Index=1015&RecordCount=57339&SessionID=95763d0f-46cf-4777-b659-7bd806609b58 [accessed 18 March 2024]
- Blackfriars of Kings Lynn: https://archaeologydataservice.ac.uk/archiveDS/archiveDownload?t=arch-1132-1/dissemination/pdf/041/041_079_086.pdf
- 'Friaries: Lynn', in A History of the County of Norfolk: Volume 2, (London, 1906) pp. 426–428. https://www.british-history.ac.uk/vch/norf/vol2/pp426-428 [accessed 18 March 2024]
- The Early English Friars Preachers, 1951, by William Hinnebusch O.P. https://books.google.com/books?id=yIoZAAAAIAAJ [accessed 18 March 2024]
- The Dominicans: A Short History, 1975, by William Hinnebusch O.P. http://opcentral.org/resources/2012/08/18/the-dominicans-a-short-history/ [accessed 18 March 2024]
