= Modeney Priory =

Benedictine priory in Norfolk

Coordinates: 52.5400383°N 0.3682941°E

- Interactive map of Modeney Priory

Monastery information
- Other names: Modney Priory; Modeny Priory
- Order: Benedictine
- Established: Before 1291
- Disestablished: c. 1536

Site
- Location: Hilgay, Norfolk, England
- Grid reference: TL6071096210
- Public access: private

Modeney Priory—also spelled Modney and Modeny—was a Benedictine priory in the civil parish of Hilgay, Norfolk, England. Located less than a mile east of the River Great Ouse, Modeney Priory was a cell of Ramsey Abbey. Modeney Priory was founded before 1291 and dissolved c. 1536. Its former location is now occupied by Modney Hall farmhouse. According to field research undertaken by Historic England in 1976: "There are no surface structural remains of the priory. Modney Hall has an 18th/19th century brick cased exterior, but according to a former owner parts of the interior date to the 15th [century]."

On 18 April 1544, the Priory was granted to Robert Hagan, who licensed it to James Hawe on 4 February 1545. Francis Blomefield in his An Essay Towards a Topographical History of the County of Norfolk (1807) writes the following succession of owners: "from the Hawes, it came to the Willoughbys; and by Catherine, a daughter of Sir Henry Willoughby, to the Purefoys, and to the Greys, and the Astons, as in Southrey, and is now in Sir Robert Burdet."

== See also ==
- List of monastic houses in Norfolk
