= Ingham Priory =

Priory in Norfolk, England

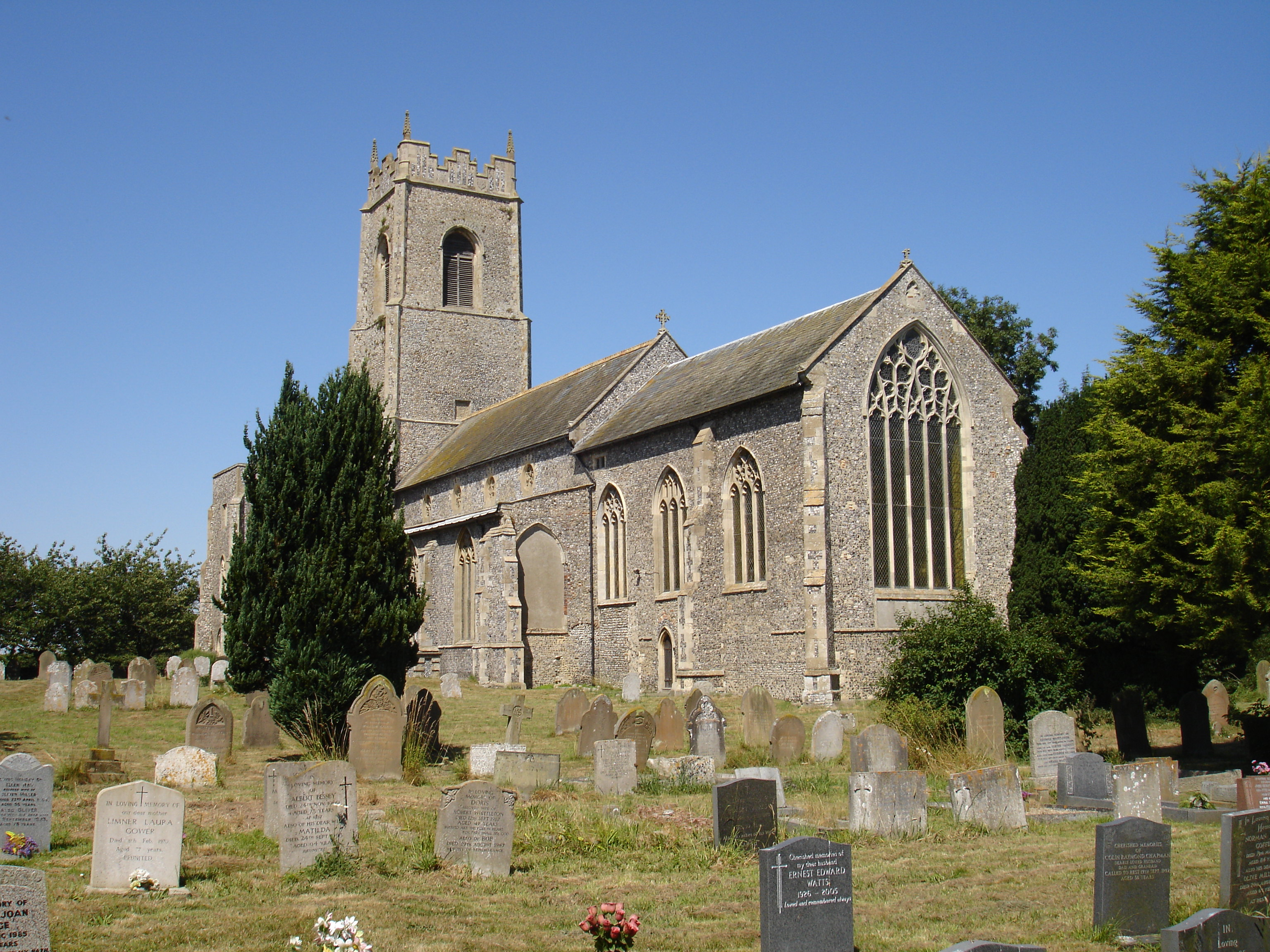
Church of the Holy Trinity, Ingham, the former priory church

Ingham Priory was a house of the Trinitarian Order in Ingham, Norfolk, England, founded by Sir Miles Stapleton, who had married the heiress of the Inghams. Pope Innocent VI authorised the foundation in 1355. It ceased to operate in 1536 during the Dissolution of the Monasteries but because the purchaser misrepresented the nature of the priory to the Commissioners the prior and convent were able to make a private sale before confiscation could take place.

The priory church survives as the parish church of the Holy Trinity. Some remains of other priory buildings, including the cloisters, stand adjoining.

== Burials ==
- Miles Stapleton

== See also ==
- List of monastic houses in Norfolk
