= Normansburgh Priory =

Priory in Norfolk, England

Normansburgh Priory was a Cluniac priory in South Raynham, Norfolk, England that was founded in 1160 by William de Liseurs, and dissolved between 1351 and 1374 under orders of Henry VIII. The building existed until 1537, but is now rubble above the foundations.
