= Lessingham Priory =

Priory in Norfolk, England

Lessingham Priory was a priory in Norfolk, England established in 1090. Very little in known about it, and there are no physical remains.
