= Wendling Abbey =

English monastic house

Coordinates: 52.6780°N 0.8669°E

Wendling Abbey was monastic house in Norfolk, England. The Abbey once stood on marshy ground near a small rivulet (small stream) which runs to the south. The abbey and outbuildings covered approximately two acres of ground, it stood on ten acres of land and was founded by one of Henry III judges called William de Wendling in the year 1265.

WILLIAM DE WENDLING Sir William de Wendling called in some records clerk son of William, and in others, son of John de Wendling, he seems to have been the same William de Wendling who was one of the Kings judges for justices (as appear from a plea pleading or an arrise at Thetford, in the year 1270 on Wednesday after the feast of Saint Mathew).

Gilbert de Preston, William de Wendling and Henry de Ryveshale, associates to the said Gilbert for canons of the premonstratenein order or that of St Robert and dedicated to St Mary the virgin.

One William de Wendling clerk, was master of the hospital of St Cross near Winchester in the 23rd of Edward I (1295 AD) and one William de Wendling farmed the manor of Brandon Ferry in Suffolk which belonged to Hugh Bishop of Ely in the 43rd of Henry III (1259 AD) Sir William de Wendling son of William de Wendling gave them the church of St Clement of Conisford, in Norwich with several houses near to it, and a key or stathe which Simon Abbot of Langley in Norfolk at the request of Sir Jeffrey de Lodnes and for 3s annual rent, confirmed to the said Sir William who in 1267 settled in with ten acres of land in Wendling (on which the abbey was built) with 3s rent in Baldeswell by a fine levied between himself and Nicholas, Abbot there, Gilbert de Fransham capital lord of the fee, being present in the court and consenting.

It does not appear that Sir William had any lordship here in Wendling. Gilbert de Fransham, manor of Fransham Magna extended into this town and gave his consent as lord of part of the land belonging to his fee.

The principal lord here was Robert de Stotevile, son of William de Stotevile lard of the manor of Gressenhale, who granted to God and the church of St Mary of Wendling in 1273 the whole site of the new work of the abbey church there saving to himself and to his heirs the patronage of it.

Sir William de Wendling also in 1267 settled on Nicholas, abbot of Wendling and his successors 5 measuages, 87 acres of land, a mill and 10s rent etc. in Scarning, he also granted to the then church of Langham, which was appropriated to them and that of Wendling. Nicholas was rector of Nedham in Holt Hundred, and in the 41st of Henry III (1257) William de Wendling was the Kings exheator.

William de Saham in 1281 settled divers lands and tenements in Wendling on the abbot and canons on condition that they paid 5 marks per annum to his chantry chaplain officiating in his chapel of St Andrew of Saham Toney.

This William was a justice itinerant in 1276 and in 1282 justice of the Kings bench. In the 53rd year of Henry III (1269 AD) they had a patent for the patronage of a moiety of Burnham Ulph, Burnham All Saints and St Margarets and the adoouson of Yaxham.

The abbot and convent had also a lordship in Feltwell Norfolk and the lordship of Guntons in Skerning.

In 1330 the Lady Margaret Foliot patron of Wendling abbey was buried before the high altar in the presbytery of the conventual church on the north side.

The donations of the founder with those of Rayner de Gimmingham, Robert de Stutevile and Jordan Foliot Knights were in the 6th of Edward III (1333 AD) confirmed.

William de Wendling conveyed to the canons all his possessions or rents in Langham, Yaxham Reymerstone, Cranworth, Letton, Shipdham Rising Crethemere, Tilney, Wiggenhall, Saddlebow, Clenchwarton, North Lynn, Walpole, Elmham, Oxborough, Brandon, Thetford, Dunham and Kempstone.

These rents were for the lights and ornaments of the abbey church, and for the dress and shoes of the canon and lay brethren.

ABBOTS OF WENDLING First abbot was Nicholas 1265 - 1273 Then Robert 1286 John (resigned) 1329 William de Saxlingham (elected) 1329 John de Norwich (died) 1339 John de Tytlesvalle (elected) 1339 Thomas 1352 John 1377 - 1398 Ralph 1425 Edmond 1432 John Skerning 1432 Thomas Walsokes 1503 John York 1509 George 1529 Thomas Ellington 1535 (last abbot)

In 1291 the abbey held possessions in 29 Norfolk parishes of which the annual value was £39 19s 7½d.

Rayner de Gimmingham granted to Nicholas, the first abbot and his convent the advowson of the church of all saints, Burnham Ulph with 2½ acres of land, and the advows a (right or presentation to a benefice in the Church of England) of a moiety of Burnham St Margaret with 3½ acres of land. Robert de Stoteville granted to the same abbot in 1273, his lordship in Wendling and the advowson of the church, and the church and chapels of Weasenham, together with forty acres at a place called Merledeland. This was confirmed by Edward III 1332.

The value of £39 19s 7½d in 1291 was slightly augmented in succeeding years by occasional gifts of lands and rents, thus in 1306 the abbot and convent were licensed to accept gifts by Nicholas de Stokerley, of a merruage (a dwelling house), a mill, 3 acres of land, 3 acres of meadow and 26/8d rents in Yaxham.

The abbot obtained the royal license to appropriate the church of Langham in 1329 and that of Yaxham in 1363.

The clear annual value of the abbey was declared to the £55 18s 4¾d by the valor of 1535 when Thomas Ellington was abbot.

In September, 1291, the abbot of Wendling received the papal mandate to grant to John de Schippedahamm priest of his monastery of illegitimate birth to minister in order received and to be promoted to dignities of his order.

In September, 1327 the constable of Dover Castle was ordered to permit the abbot of Wendling to cross the fens from that part to attend the general chapter at Pre’Mont and to supply him with twenty marks towards his expenses.

In 1411 Pope John XXXII granted an indulgence during ten years, of one hundred days to penitents who, on certain specified feasts should visit and give arms for the repair of the monastic church of Wendling where were preserved certain pieces of the true cross, a foot of St Lucy the virgin and other relics.

On the death of abbot John de Norwich in 1339, the canons proceeded at once to the election of a successor, without waiting for the necessary formalities. Thereupon the abbot of Langdon, who was acting as visitor and commissary for the abbot of Pre’Montre wrote to the abbot of Dereham styling the late John de Norwich an unworthy man who had assumed the position of abbot and pointing out the irregulations of the canons who had procured to make another unworthy election. He ordered the abbot of Dereham to appear before him as commissary, in the church of St Radegund on Monday before the Exaltation of the cross the new abbot (if he could be called so) and two proclers to represent the convent to show cause why this uncanomical election should not be annulled. The result is not known, but John de Tytlehshalle eventually succeeded as superior.

At his first visitation tour as commissary of the abbot of Pre’Montre in 1475, Bishop Redman tarried at Wendling from 28 to 30 June. Three years later he was again at Wendling on 30 June when the abbot was ordered to see to the observance of the day and night hours, which were imperilled through paucity of numbers and to rebuild the church which had been destroyed by fire as soon as possible. The debt of £60 noted in 1475 had been reduced by the abbots care to £13.

In addition to John Skerning abbot and John Grey, sub-prior there were only four other canons. They had three churches in their charge which were served either by regular curates or by canons who could be directed at will.

When Bishop Redman reached Wendling on his visitation tour of 1482 he praised the general condition of the house. Considerable progress had been made with the buildings but he urged for greater speed with the church. He gave some attention to the smaller details of worship such as directing that Antiphons of the Canticles should be sung only by the priests. Richard Fenwick conlumacions and rebellious was sentenced to forty days of severe penance and to banishment to Leicester abbey for three years. In addition to abbot and prior, there were but four other canons two of whom were novices. The numbers were that same at the visitation made on the 27th June, 1488 when two of the inmates were sentenced by the bishop. In one case there had been rebellion and disobedience but the offender promised obedience and was order to be castigated otherwise to appear before the provincial chapter. The other offender was brought before the visitor for defects in singing the collects but he refused to ask pardon and was ordered to say the noctrum of the pralter in cloister the same day after dinner as discipline.

The bishop entered that everything else was excellent that there had been much progress in the building of the church and conventual house, and that there was no debt.

At the visitation of September, 1491 there were six canons in addition to abbot Skerning but one was a rebel. Thomas Milthorn the rebel of the last visitation had not improved, on the contrary, he was sentenced to forty days of penance and to three years absence at Sulby. The abbot was ordered to raise the number of canons to at least eight. There was however no improvement in numbers when the bishop again visited in 1494, the canons including the abbot numbered six. On this occasion there were various ritual injunctions and John Barlyng for incontenency was condemned to forty days penance and two years at some other house.

At the visitation of 1497 there were five canons and two novices. On this occasion the bishop found nothing worthy of correction, the house was not in debt and was abundantly supplied. The abbot was ordered to repair the dormitory. Ave Maria Stella was to be sung daily at evensong.

The last recorded visitation of Bishop Redman was in 1500, when there were six canons and two novices, the visitor found that all was delightful.

In 1536 the secret comperta of Legh and Leyton allege incontinency against the abbot. Later in the same year the county commissioners reported that the abbot and convent had leased on 1 November 1534, a large portion of their land and possessions to Richard Southwell (one of the commissioners) and Robert Logram. ‘They found at the house religious persons and all prysters who done require capasities. There name as nott goode’. There were also two hinds and ten servants at the abbey. The lead and bells were worth £100, but the house was in much decay. The goods were worth £12 8s 9d but the house owed £66 17s 11d. According to the same commissioners certificate dated 27 January 1537 the staff of this house contained in the inventory was sold to Robert Logan for £13 6s 8d, the plate valued at 41s 8d was received in the charge of Richard Southwell on 6 February 1537, ex abbot Thomas Ellington was assigned a pension of 100s in spite of the charge of incontenency. This small abbey was one of those whose dissolution was permitted by Clement VII’s bill of 1528, and whose possessions were granted to Cardinal Wolsey for the erection of his two collyers, but Wolsey’s fall prevented that dissolution being carried out. Eventually, in 1546 Henry VIII granted it to the dean and chapter of Christ Church, Oxford on its own foundation.

In 1810 the last of the remains above ground were used for repairing roads.

PREMONSTRATENTIAN CANONS OR WHITE CANONS The founder of this order was a priest of Lorraine, named Northbertus, who formed the rule for his new order out of that of St Augustine, which was afterwards approved and confirmed by Pope Calixtus II in 1120 AD. This order came into England in 1140 AD.

Wendling abbey founded 1267 AD.

West Dereham abbey founded 1188AD.

Langley founded 1198 AD.

Premonstratentions also called Norbertines, their habit was a long which cloth coat open before, and a linen surplice over it, and above that a long white cloak, a corner cap or hat when they went abroad white also, and underneath all doublets, breeches, linen shirts, shoes and white stockings. They began about 1120 AD at a place called Premonstration in Picardly.

Stephen Olley, The Book of Wendling Longham and Beeston with Bittering, By Myself.
