= Docking Priory =

Former medieval house in Norfolk, England

Docking Priory was a medieval monastic house in West Norfolk, England.

== History ==
Docking Priory was a small cell of the Benedictine abbey of Irvy in France, to which house the church was appropriated. It was dissolved by the Parliament of Leicester in 1415. The Priory was passed to Joan, Dowager Queen of England, and then by Henry VI to Eton College in 1441.

== Village Location ==
As yet, historians have found no trace of the monastic buildings in Docking.
