= Hempton Priory =

- The Priory Church of Saint Stephen, Hempton
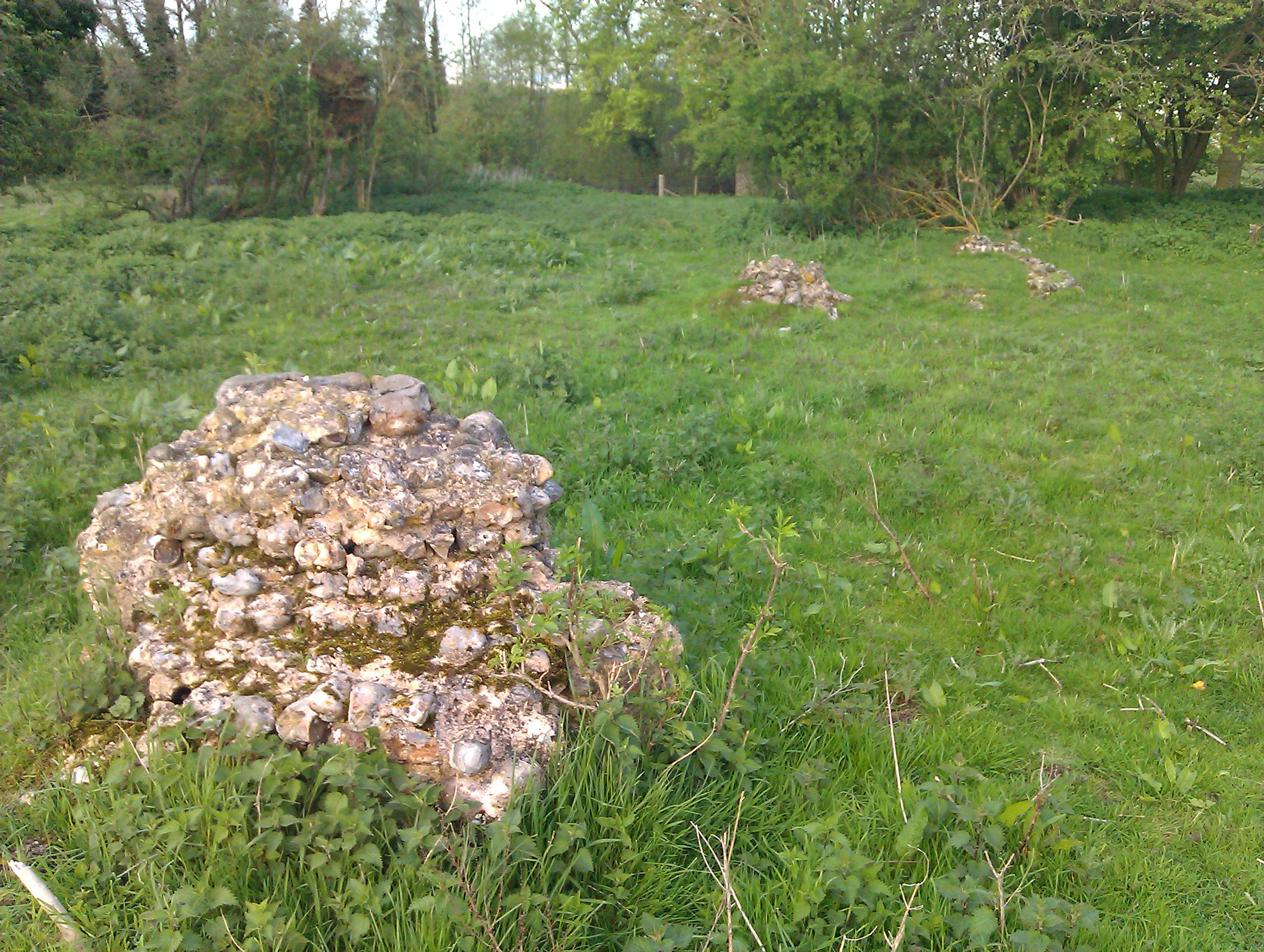
- Priory ruins, 2012

- Location within Norfolk
- 52°49′N 0°50′E
- Location: Hempton, Norfolk
- Country: England
- Denomination: Roman Catholic

Architecture
- Years built: 1135
- Demolished: 1536

Hempton Priory was a medieval monastery at Hempton in Norfolk, England, variously referred to also as Fakenham or Damsend Priory.

Of the buildings of the medieval institution very few surface remains can be seen, although substantial earthworks are evident and the foundations of a long building have been noted as incorporated into a later building.

== History ==
During the reign of Henry I, before 1135, the house was founded as a hospital by Roger de St Martin (St Martins), lord of the manor of Hempton, with Richard Ward. The latter assumed the role of the first prior when the hospital became a priory of the Augustinian Canons Regular.

King John granted Hempton Priory rights to hold a fair, later rising to three fairs a year. The prior claimed a market on Tuesday, which was noted as being long obsolete in White's Directory of 1854. The net income from its estates in 1535 was £32 14s. 8d.

The priory continued to be used as a hospital after 1200. It was seized by the crown in 1536, the land being granted to Sir William Fermer in 1545/6. The land subsequently became the property of Viscount Towsnhend.

== Priors ==
- 1165-1166, Simon was prior in the 12th year of Henry II
- 1269-1270, Richard occurs as prior, in the 54th year of Henry III
- Guy Ferret
- In 1301, Richard de Westacre, was admitted as prior.
- Alan de Lenn
- 1339, Nicholas de Kettleston
- 1386, John de Snoring
- 1393, John Pencthorp
- 1402-1403, John occurs as prior in the 4th year of Henry IV
- John occurs as prior, about the 15th.
- 1438-1439, 1449-1450, Richard occurs as prior in the 17th and the 28th years of Henry VI
- 1451, Stephen Wighton, a canon of Westacre, elected prior in 1451, and confirmed by the Bishop on 2 October
- 1481, John de Lexham, alias Penton, occurs then as prior in 1504.
- William Fakenham
- 1529-1530, John Sambrook occurs as prior in the 21st year of Henry VIII
- In 1534, Henry Salter occurs as prior.

== Priory seal ==
The seal of the priory was oblong in shape, of red wax, showing an image of St Stephen standing under an arch between two tapers, with the legend 'SIGILLUM COMMUNE SANCTI STEPHANI DE HEMPTON'. Under this was the image of a figure kneeling under an arch.
