= Peterstone Priory =

Priory in Burnham Overy, King's Lynn and West Norfolk, England

Coordinates: 52.9520°N 0.7693°E

Peterstone Priory a house of Augustinian Canons, was a priory in Burnham Overy, Norfolk, England. It was founded before 1200 and incorporated 1449.
