= Welle Priory =

Priory in Norfolk, England

Welle Priory was a priory in Gayton, in Norfolk, England.
