= Greyfriars, King's Lynn =

Franciscan friary in Norfolk, England

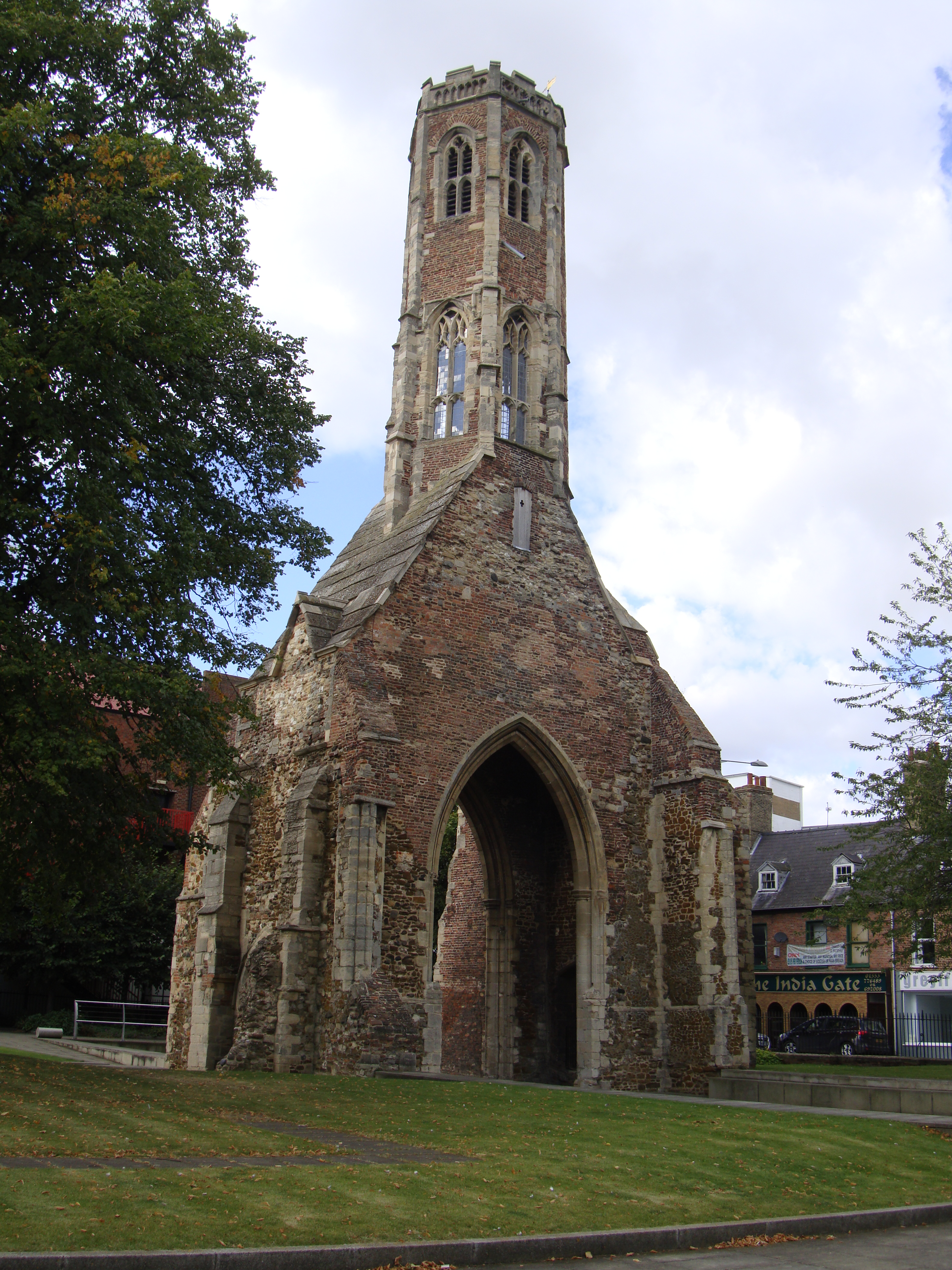
Remains of the Grey Friars' church, King's Lynn, Norfolk

Greyfriars, King's Lynn was a Franciscan friary in Norfolk, England. The tower, known as Greyfriars Tower (52.7514°N 0.3990°E) survives. It is one of only three surviving Franciscan monastery towers in England and is considered to be the finest. It is a Grade I listed building.

Following the Dissolution of the Monasteries by Henry VIII, the tower at Lynn remained because it was considered to be a useful seamark by sailors entering the town, still being clearly visible on the town's skyline to this day.

The tower is informally referred to as 'the leaning tower of Lynn' as it leans dramatically to the west. At its worst, the lean was 67.5 centimetres - which given its height of more than 28 metres is just over 1 degree. This compares to 3.98 degrees on the Leaning Tower of Pisa.

Although it is not believed to be in imminent danger of collapse, until recently it did require work to correct the lean to ensure it remains a part of the King's Lynn skyline. The tower itself was featured in the first season of the BBC TV series Restoration for the Eastern region. The tower won its regional and proceeded to the national final, which was won by the Victoria Baths in Manchester. This was completed by August 2006 and on 18 October 2006 the grounds were officially opened by the Mayor, Councillor Ann Clery-Fox.

== See also ==
- List of monastic houses in Norfolk
