= Mountjoy Priory =

Monastery

Coordinates: 52.725°N 1.194°E

Mountjoy Priory was a priory in Norfolk, England.
