= Aldeby =

Village in Norfolk, England

Coordinates: 52.483°N 1.608°E

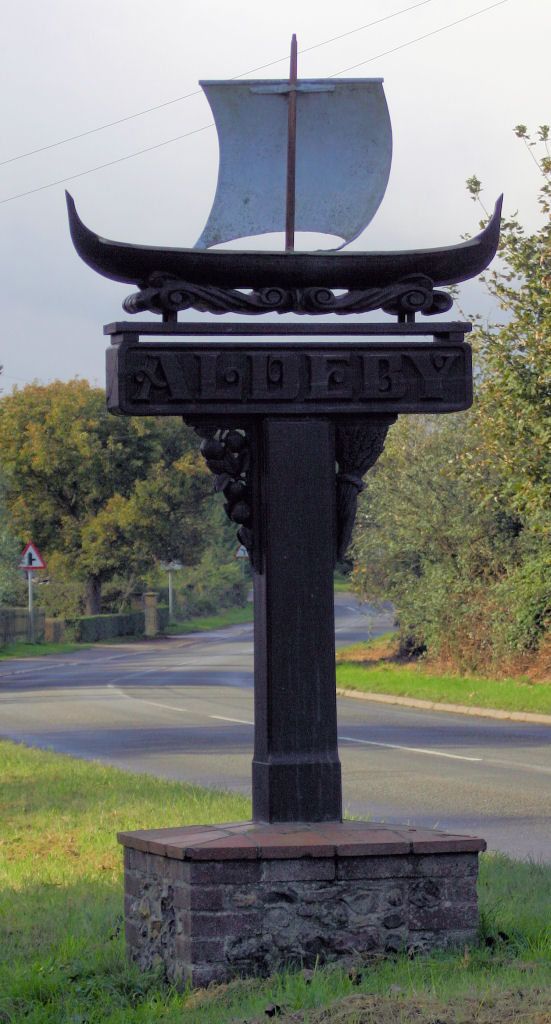
- Aldeby village sign

- Location within Norfolk
- Area: 12.61 km^{2} (4.87 sq mi)
- Population: 420 (2011)
  - Density: 33/km^{2} (85/sq mi)
- OS grid reference: TM450933
- District: South Norfolk
- Shire county: Norfolk
- Region: East
- Country: England
- Sovereign state: United Kingdom
- Post town: BECCLES
- Postcode district: NR34
- Dialling code: 01502
- Police: Norfolk
- Fire: Norfolk
- Ambulance: East of England
- UK Parliament: South Norfolk

Aldeby is a village and civil parish in Norfolk, England. It is bounded to the south by the River Waveney, on the other side of which is Suffolk. The village is about 5 miles (8.0 km) by road from Beccles.

== History ==
The name Aldeby derives from the Old Norse word meaning "old fortification". The civil parish has an area of 12.61 square kilometres (4.87 sq mi) and in 2001 had a population of 437 in 175 household, falling to a population of 422 in 180 households at the 2011 Census. For the purposes of local government, the parish falls within the area of the district of South Norfolk.

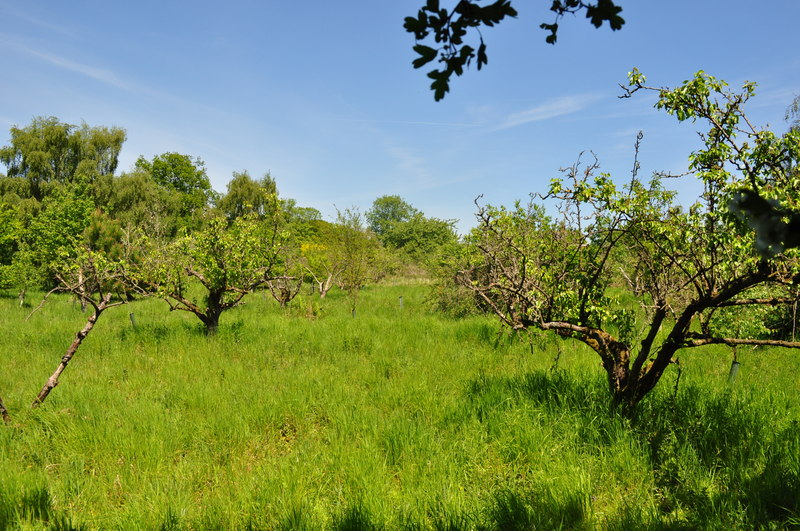
Old Apple Orchard, Three Gates Farm

Aldeby is well known for its fishing pits and also historically for the apple factory (Waveney Apple Growers Ltd) based on Common Road that closed in the late 1990s. It also once had its own railway station.

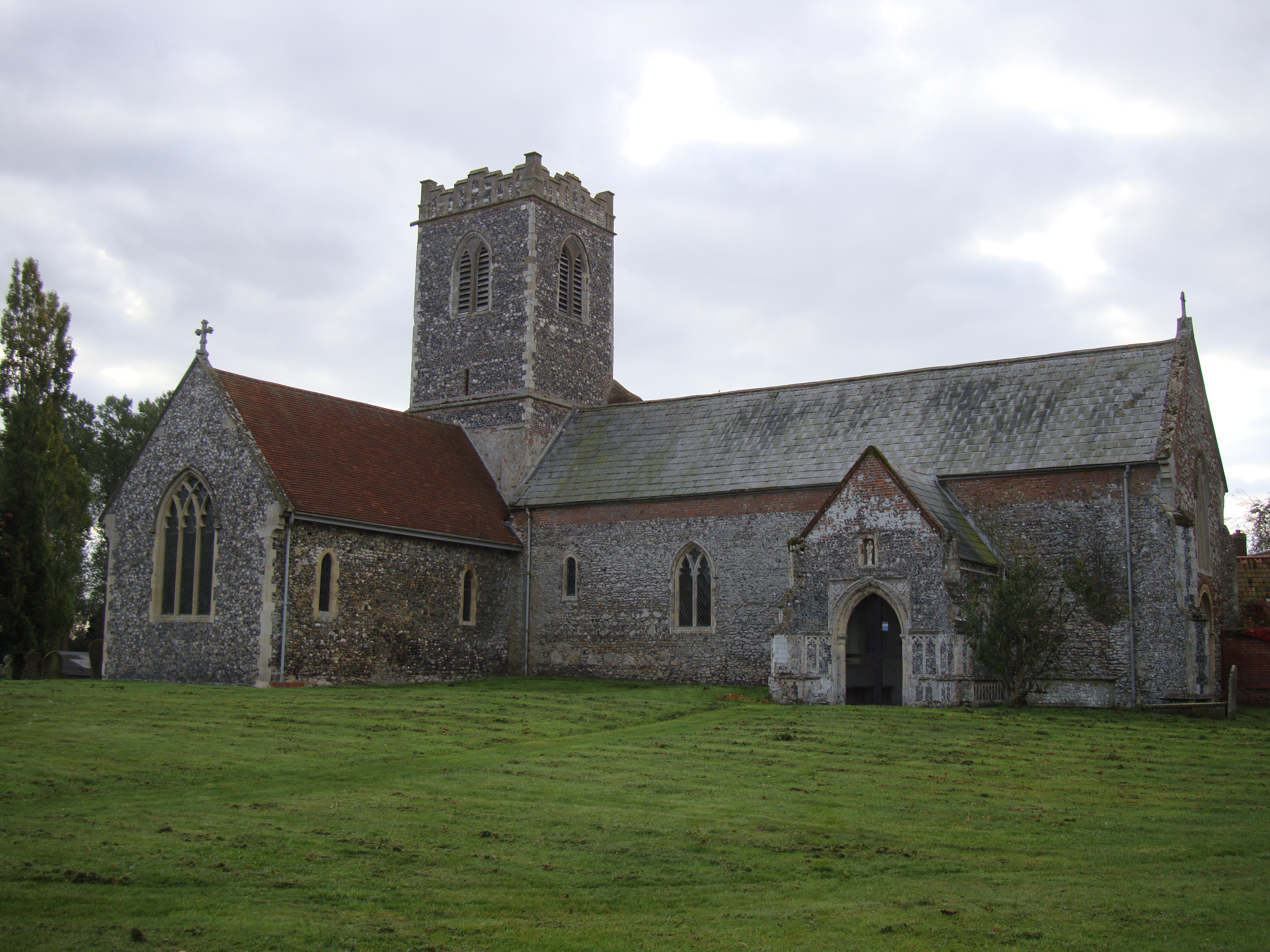
St Mary's Parish Church, Aldeby

Aldeby is mentioned in the Domesday Book and was part of Clavering hundred. Aldeby Priory was located here.

Between 1959 and 1968, the village was the location of a Royal Observer Corps monitoring bunker, to be used in the event of a nuclear attack. It remains mostly intact.
