= Aldeby Priory =

Priory in Norfolk, England

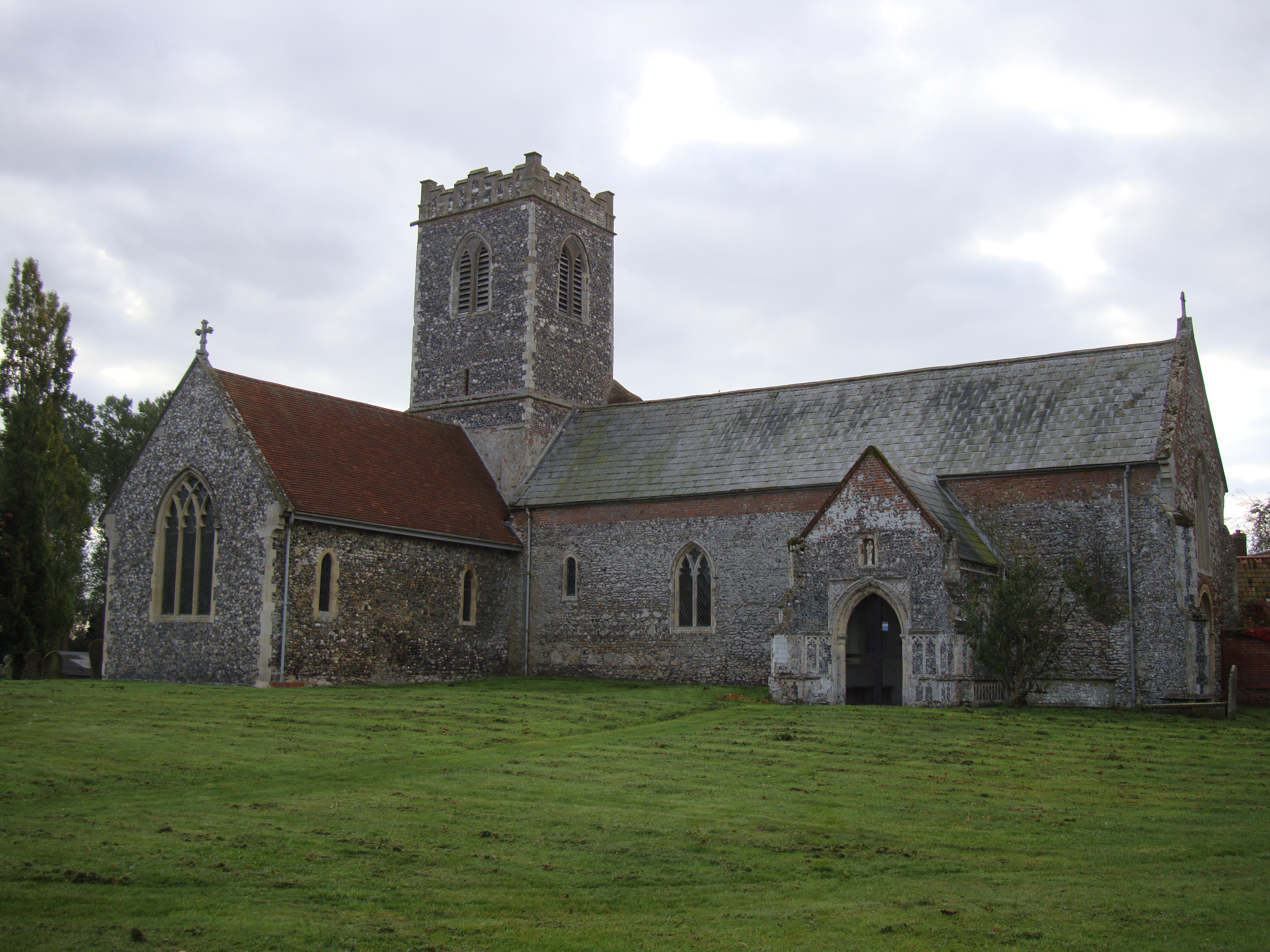
St Mary's Church, Aldeby - owned by the Benedictine monks at Aldeby Priory, probably used for officiating

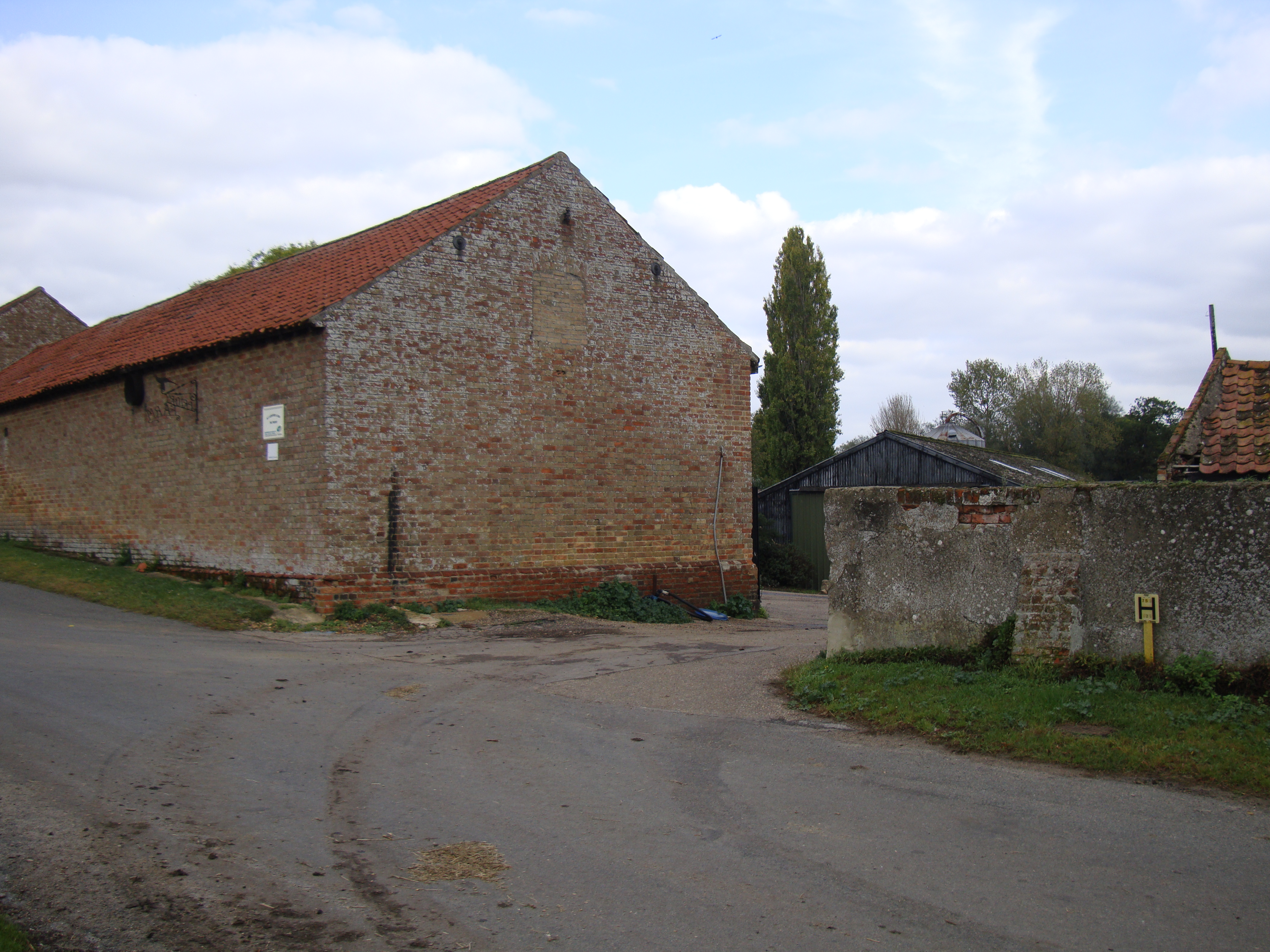
Abbey Farm, Aldeby, Norfolk - site of Aldeby Priory

Aldeby Priory was a 12th-century Benedictine monastic house in Aldeby, Norfolk, England.

== History ==
Agnes de Beaupré, who was afterwards the wife of Hubert de Rye, gave in the reign of Henry I, the church and manor of Aldeby to the monks of Norwich. Whereupon Bishop Herbert placed here a prior and three Benedictine monks, establishing the house as a priory cell of Norwich. When the conventual church was founded, Bishop Herbert laid the first foundation-stone and Hubert and Agnes the second. Henry I confirmed to the priory, which was dedicated to the honour of St. Mary, the grant by Hubert de Rye of tithes in Swanton, Hockering, and Deepham, together with the church and manor of Aldeby, and other grants of Henry de Rye, the son of Hubert. The temporalities were valued at £71 5s. 6d. in the year 1428.

In 1275 the jury of Knavering hundred found the prior of Aldeby had assize of bread and beer, and held view of frank-pledge, but they knew not by what warrant. In 1286 William Rosalyne purchased of the prior and convent of Norwich the lordship of this town, except certain messuages and lands and the advowson of the church, which were reserved to the convent and henceforth called the prior's manor.

On 27 May 1355, John de Bedingfield, prior of Aldeby, was appointed by Laurence, prior of Norwich, acting as vicar-general for the bishop, to hear the confessions of the nuns of Bungay. In 1376 Sir Thomas Savage was buried by the south porch of the priory church. In 1466 Lady Isabel Morley died patroness of the priory, being heir to the founders, Hubert and Agnes de Rye. In 1481 Edmund Salle, Roger Framlingham, and William Spink were the three monks of this cell.

The priors of the several cells of Norwich had to present annual accounts to the prior of Norwich. Various of these account rolls for Aldeby are extant in the treasury of Norwich Cathedral, namely from 1422 to 1426, from 1440 to 1442, for the year 1462, and twelve others at irregular intervals, the last being for 1523.

At the visitation of Norwich Priory in 1514, John Lakenham, the prior of Aldeby, could only give a poor account of himself and his cell. He had not handed in the accounts of the last year, though he said he was prepared to do so; the house was in debt to the extent of £10; he had only paid £5 of his annual pension to the mother house, but the cellarer held a marsh pertaining to the cell by way of exoneration; the gates of the cell and the brewery were in a ruinous state. The bishop's injunctions consequent on this visit insist on all cells returning annual accounts to be deposited in the Norwich treasury each Michaelmas. Edmund Norwich was prior of Aldeby at the visitation of 1532; he was examined, but only as to the condition of Norwich Priory.

(Merge: /copyedit) At Aldby, Aldeby, or Aldeburg, was a small priory, or a cell, to that of Norwich. It was founded by Agnes de Beaufoe, or Beko, afterwards wife of Hubert de Rye, for a prior and three black monks; and was endowed with lands and appropriate tythes, in the time of Henry the First, by Henry de Rye, the son of Hubert and Agnes, " whom Tanner, by mistake, calls Robert de Ria*." From a licence granted by King Edward the First, to William Roscelyne, for purchasing of the priory at Norwich, the lordship of this village, except a manor reserved to the convent; it appears, contrary to the opinion of some great lawyers, that manors have been erected within what is termed prescriptive time. Other instances will occur corroborative of this fact. In a contest, subsequent to this purchase, between William Rospelyne and the prior, respecting commonable rights; the former permitted the latter to dig marie, for the purpose of improving his lands in the great common of Aldby, then called Mekylheyth. This was in the year 1310, and the circumstance tends to prove, that what is magnified into new discovery, is often no more than a renewal of an old practice, which had been long neglected, or forgotten. Marling of lands, in which beneficial improvement Norfolk has eminently taken the lead, is stated, by some authors on agriculture, to have been first introduced about the year 1748. The temporalities of this priory, in the sixth year of Edward the Fourth, were valued at 7l. 15s. 6d. On the dissolution it escheated to the crown, and, on the foundation of a dean and chapter at Norwich, was conferred on that ecclesiastical body.

== Priors of Aldeby ==
- John de Bedingfield, occurs 1355
- Richard de Rye, occurs 1422
- Thomas Hethyll, occurs 1462
- William Bexwell, occurs 1505
- John Lakenham, occurs 1514
- Edmund Norwich alias Drake, occurs 1532
