= Flitcham Priory =

Priory in Norfolk, England

Flitcham Priory was a priory in Norfolk, England first founded by Sir Robert III Aguillon.
