= Witchingham Priory =

Priory in Norfolk, England

Witchingham Priory was a priory in Norfolk, England.

== History ==
Walter Giffard, 1st Earl of Buckingham granted land to monks in Norfolk.
