= Great Yarmouth Black Friary =

Monastery in Norfolk, England

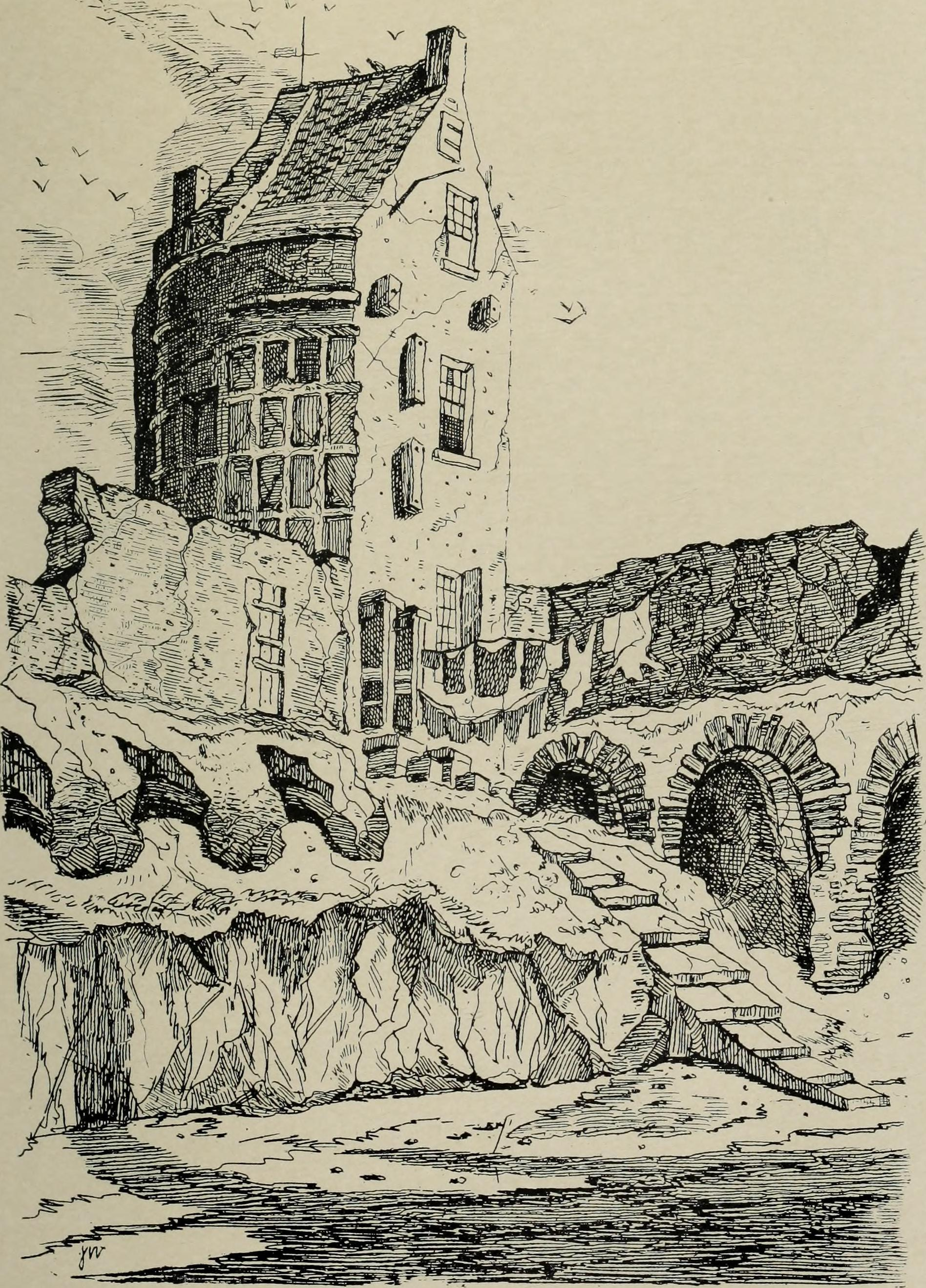
GREAT YARMOUTH, SOUTH-WEST TOWER O FDOMINICAN PRIORY (The English Dominicans (1921) by Bede Jarrett

Great Yarmouth Black Friary was a monastery for the Dominican Order (known as black friars) in Norfolk, England during the medieval times. A fire station is in its place now and is marked by a blue plaque.

The friary was one of five large religious houses during that dominated a settlement by the seaside during the peak of its wealth and power. The first building was completed in 1273, two years after permission was given by Henry III.

The site was discovered in 1970 when the fire station was being built and investigations by archaeologists were carried out. Excavations revealed gargoyles and stone coffins as well as 15 people who were buried at the site.
