= Great Yarmouth Carmelite Friary =

Carmelite friary in Norfolk, England

Great Yarmouth Carmelite Friary in Norfolk, England, was founded in 1276 by the White Friars or Carmelites in the reign of Edward I and dedicated to St. Mary.

From 1430 to 1455, a John Tylney was prior. On 1 April 1509, the church and convent burnt down. In 1538 the friary was suppressed by Richard Yngworth, and in 1544 the land was granted to Thomas Denton and Robert Nottingham.

A 17th-century Grade II listed building now stands on the site at 6-12 George Street, Great Yarmouth.
