= West Acre Priory =

Building in West Acre, Norfolk, England

Coordinates: 52.703°N 0.633°E

West Acre Priory of St. Mary and All Saints was a medieval monastic house at West Acre in the King's Lynn and West Norfolk district of Norfolk, England founded c.1100 by the de Toni family. Later an Augustinian fraternity, it was closed down in 1538 as part of the Dissolution of the Monasteries under King Henry VIII. It is now a ruin with no intention of being repaired.

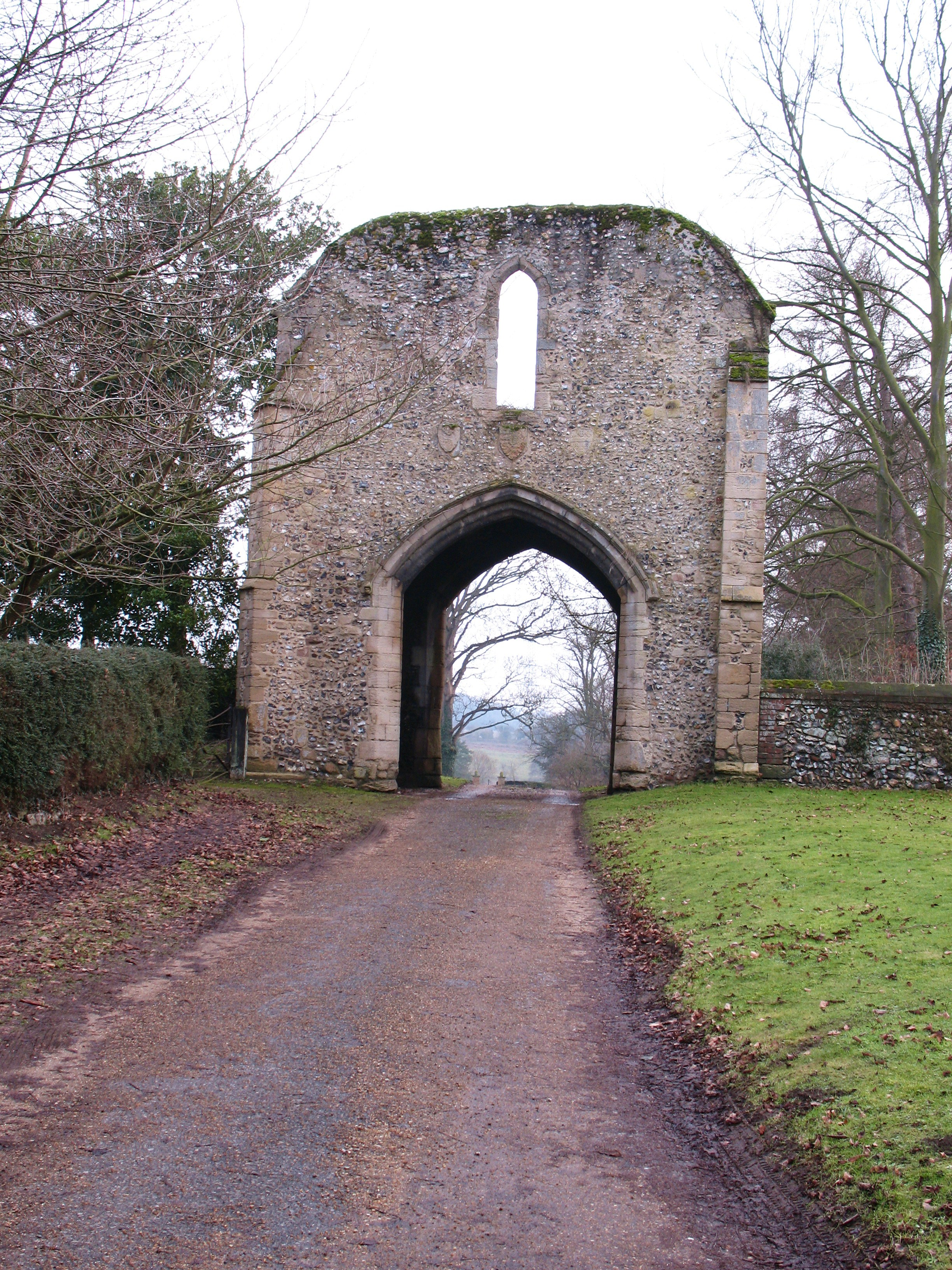
The Priory gatehouse

The ruined priory gatehouse is a grade I listed building, the north side of which has a two centred arch surmounted by three shields with coats of arms, legible in the 18th century as the arms of de Toni and the Earls of Warwick.
