= Happisburgh =

Village in Norfolk, England

Coordinates: 52.8242°N 1.5309°E

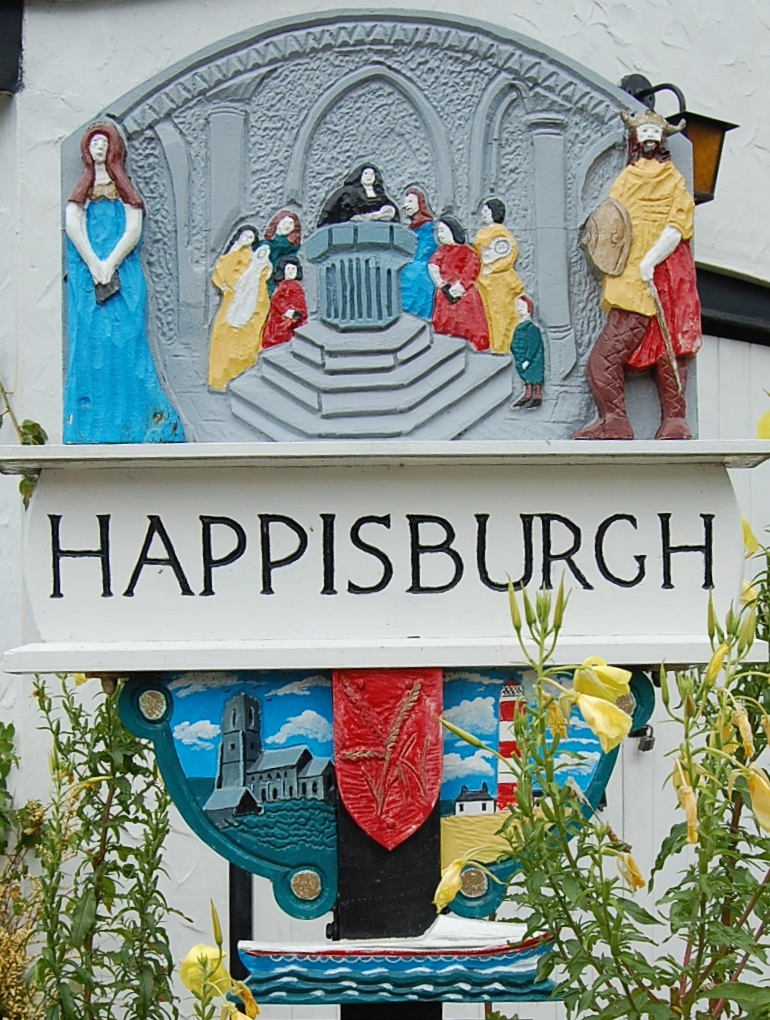
- Happisburgh village sign

- Location within Norfolk
- Area: 9.63 km^{2} (3.72 sq mi)
- Population: 870 https://www.citypopulation.de/en/uk/eastofengland/admin/north_norfolk/E04006422__happisburgh/
  - Density: 90/km^{2} (230/sq mi)
- OS grid reference: TG 39 31
  - London: 137 miles (220 km)
- Civil parish: Happisburgh
- District: North Norfolk
- Shire county: Norfolk
- Region: East
- Country: England
- Sovereign state: United Kingdom
- Post town: NORWICH
- Postcode district: NR12
- Dialling code: 01692
- Police: Norfolk
- Fire: Norfolk
- Ambulance: East of England
- UK Parliament: North Norfolk

Happisburgh (/ˈheɪzbʌrə, -bərə/) is a village and civil parish in the English county of Norfolk. The village is on the coast, approximately 14 miles south-east of Cromer and 20 miles north of Great Yarmouth. It is a nucleated village. The nearest substantial town is North Walsham 6 miles (10 km) to the west.

Happisburgh is known for its distinctive red-and-white lighthouse, medieval church and secluded beach, which has become a site of global archaeological importance, having provided evidence of early human activity dating back 800,000 years. The village has also become well known for the effects of coastal erosion.

== Name and pronunciation ==
The place-name Happisburgh is first attested in the Domesday Book of 1086, where it appears as Hapesburc. The name means 'Hæp's fort or fortified place'. The common pronunciation is as if it is spelled Haisborough, like the nearby Haisborough Sands.

== Governance ==
The 2021 Census shows the parish (which also includes the settlements Happisburgh Common and Whimpwell Green) to have a population of 870.Happisburgh electoral ward includes the parishes of Happisburgh, Lessingham, East Ruston, Ingham, Honing and Brunstead, with a population of 2,646 recorded in the 2021 Census. For the purposes of local government, the parish is in the district of North Norfolk

== Landmarks ==
=== Happisburgh Lighthouse ===
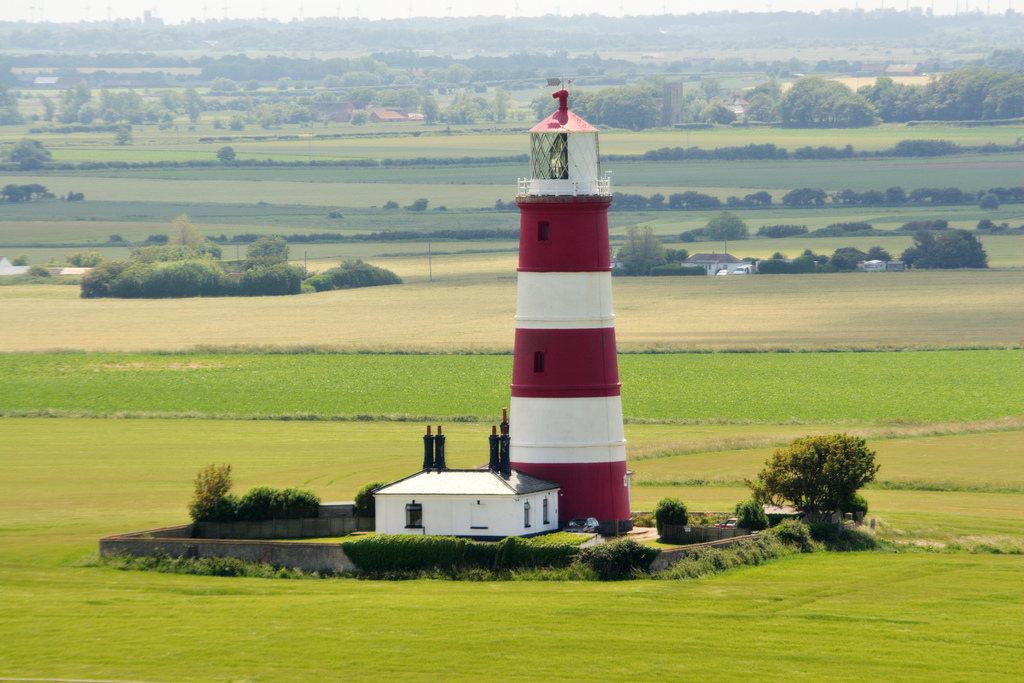
Happisburgh Lighthouse

The red-and-white striped lighthouse, 0.5 miles (800 m) to the south of the church, is the only independently operated lighthouse in Great Britain and is the oldest working lighthouse in East Anglia having been constructed in 1790. It is open to the public on occasional days during the summer.

=== The Church of St Mary ===
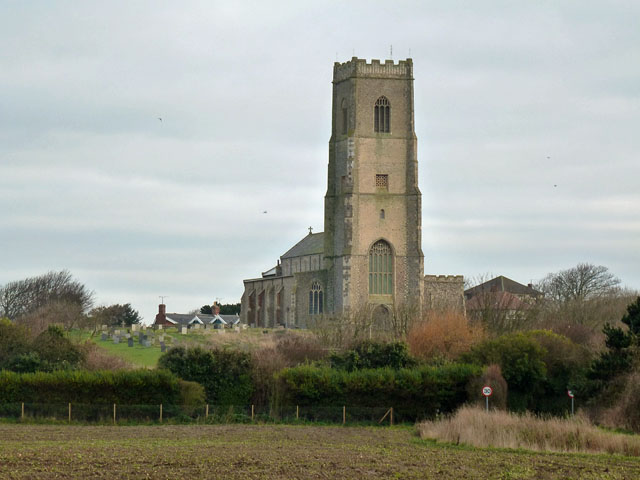
St Mary's Church, Happisburgh

St Mary's Church is a grade I listed building. It dates from the 15th century with some 14th century features. There is evidence that there was a church on the same site in Norman times, and that some of the stonework has been incorporated into the fabric of the current building. At 110 feet (33.5 m), the tower is one of the tallest in Norfolk.

In 1940, a German bomber aircraft released a trapped bomb from its bays during its return to Germany, and some shrapnel from the bomb can still be seen embedded in the aisle pillars of the church. The church's octagonal font, also of the 15th century, is carved with figures of lions and satyrs.

The churchyard is home to the mass grave of 119 mariners from HMS Invincible, which was wrecked off Happisburgh in 1801. The grave is marked by a memorial stone, installed in 1998.

The church is open daily for visitors, there are regular tower open days when visitors can climb to the top, and there are occasional organ concerts over the summer months.

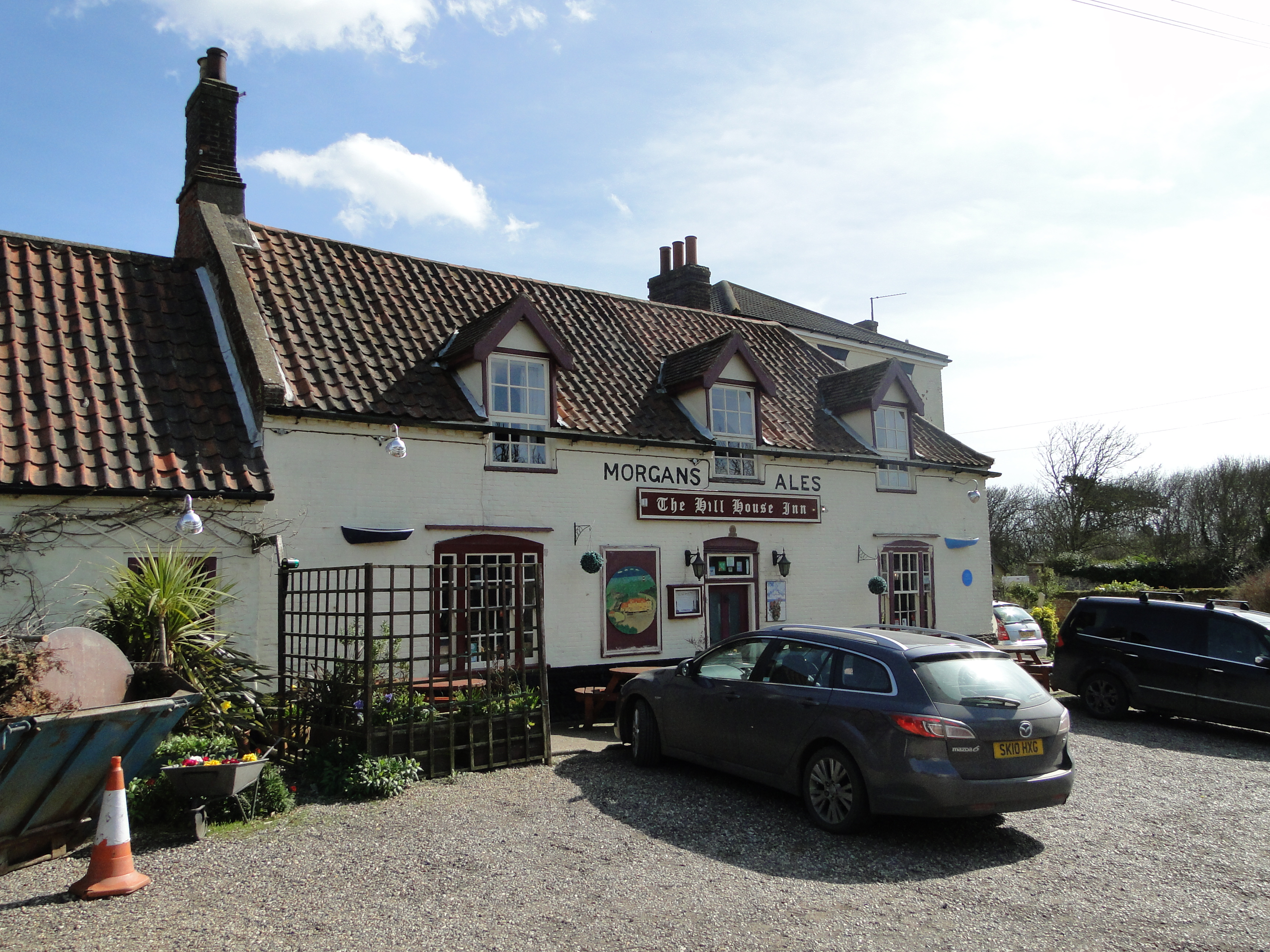
The Hill House Inn, Happisburgh.

=== The Hill House Inn ===
The Hill House Inn is a pub with bed and breakfast which dates back to the 16th century. Parts of the building are grade II Listed. The pub serves real ale and hosts an annual summer solstice beer festival. Outside, overlooking the large beer garden is an old railway signal box, built for a railway which was announced but never materialised. It is now used as guest accommodation. Inside the pub there is Sherlock Holmes memorabilia - Sir Arthur Conan Doyle was inspired to write a short story featuring the detective while staying here. The walls are also decorated with historical photos of the area, an oil painting of the wrecking of HMS Invincible, which occurred at Haisborough Sands, and an artist's reconstruction of the area 800,000 years ago with a sign reading HAPPISBURGH-ON-THAMES, relating to the discovery of the Happisburgh Footprints. Perhaps uniquely, the pub has a geological feature named after it - the Hill House Member, part of the Cromer Forest-bed Formation. The Hill House Inn, is owned by the family of Lorna Sage; A photograph of her is displayed in the bar.

=== Happisburgh Manor or St Mary's ===
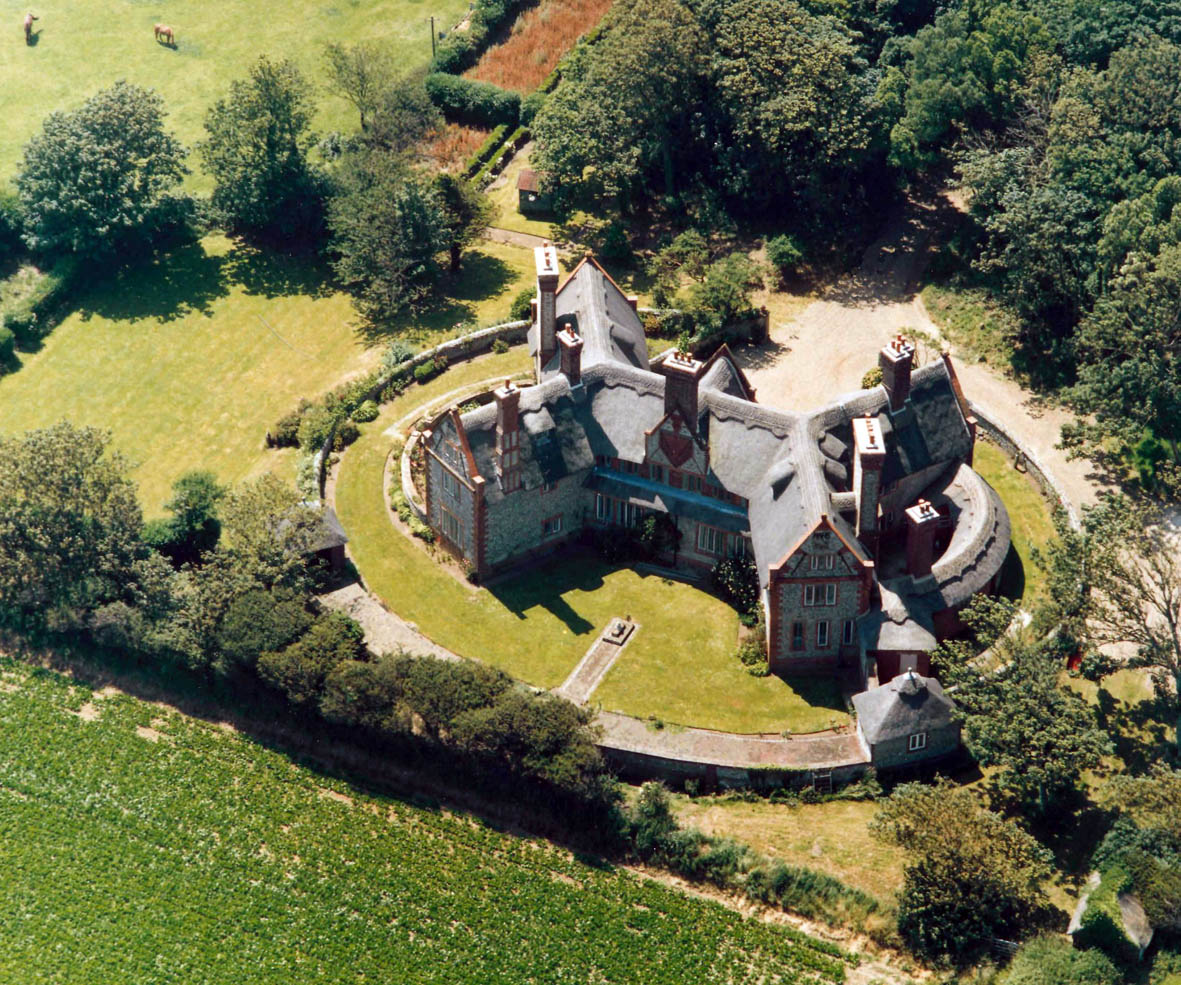
Happisburgh Manor (St Mary's) c. 1992

Happisburgh Manor, also known as St Mary's, is a grade II* listed building and garden in the centre of the village. It was designed in 1900 as an Arts and Crafts movement house by Detmar Blow for landowner Albemarle Cator of Woodbastwick Hall and is said to be the first butterfly plan house fully realised. Two other houses, St John's and St Anne's, were built as part of the estate.

During the Second World War, the house was requisitioned by the Observer Corps. The north end was destroyed by a bomb, and was restored by Christobel Tab (née Cator) after the war.

The Cators sold the estate in 1969, when the three houses of St John's, St Anne's and St Mary's came into separate ownership. St Mary's was subsequently used as a restaurant and country club until 1989 when it became a private home.

=== Historic military and communications infrastructure ===
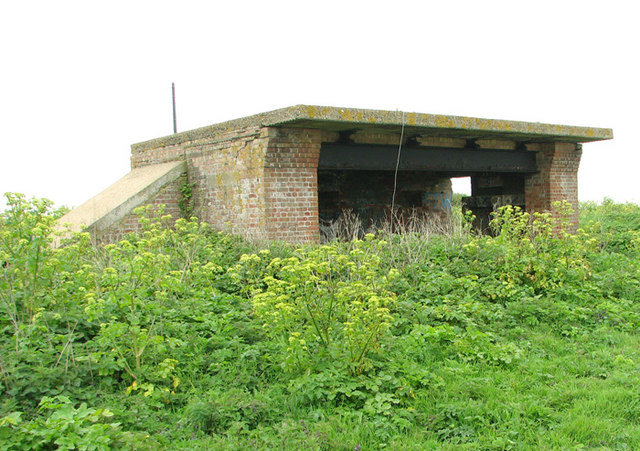
Happisburgh gun battery - the east gun house

Happisburgh has numerous structures built as part of the defence network during World War II. These included a 4.7 inch coastal battery to the north west of the church and numerous pill boxes. There are also the remains of a RADAR station.

The Decca Field is an area of land at the cliff top just north of Cart Gap. Historically it was used as the location for a transmission mast for the Decca Navigator System. It is distinct from the area around the WWII coastal battery, which was being used by Decca in 1982.

=== Arts and heritage ===
The Deep History Coast trail runs from Weybourne to Cart Gap. It is a walk of 22 miles (36 km), divided into shorter sections with access and information points every couple of miles, including at the Beach Road and Cart Gap car parks. The Happisburgh Time and Tide Bell, 'The Spirit of Haisbro'', was installed in 2023 and was designed to chime with the movements of the tide. An ever-changing sculpture on the beach at Cart Gap is curated by local artist Belinda Opie.

== Community facilities ==
The village recreation ground houses a sports pavilion and bowling green and is used by Happisburgh Cricket Club. The Wenn Evans Centre, the village hall, is located at the recreation ground and hosts community activities.

Happisburgh Coastwatch is run by volunteers, operating from a lookout at Cart Gap.

Happisburgh Lifeboat Station is located at Cart Gap, at the south-eastern end of the village. It houses a D-class inshore lifeboat, D-607 Spirit of Berkhamsted. There is also a small RNLI gift shop on site.

Happisburgh Church of England Primary School is located in the centre of the village. The original two room school was built in 1861 in the Gothic style. It has since been sympathetically extended. It is now run as an academy.

== Coastal erosion ==
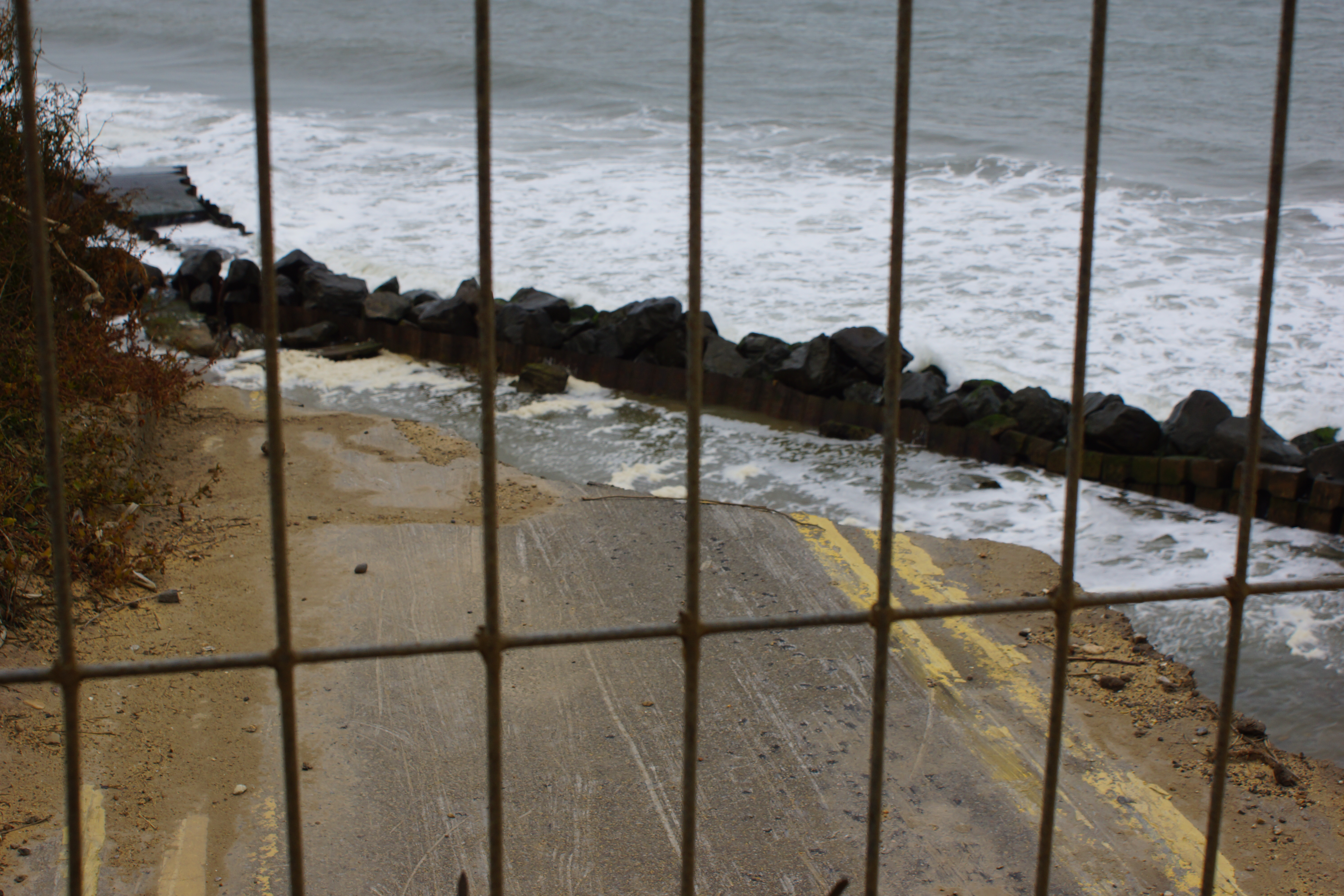
A Happisburgh road partially washed away by coastal erosion.

Land has been lost to the sea in the area for thousands of years, since the last ice age. The medieval settlement of Whimpwell, recorded in the Domesday Book (1086) as part of the parish of Happisburgh, is believed to have existed to the east of the current coastline and was reported lost to the sea by 1183.

Following the North Sea Flood of 1953, new defences were constructed at Happisburgh from 1959. Their deterioration in the 1990s resulted in a period of rapid erosion with one section of cliff retreating 50 metres (160 ft) between 1996 and 1999. The current shoreline management plan, adopted in 2012, is 'managed realignment', replacing the previous policy of 'hold the line'.

Between 1988 and 2025, 35 residential properties were lost to coastal change with a further three demolished in 2026. Agricultural land has also been lost.

Happisburgh has been involved in two pilot coastal adaptation programmes: Pathfinder, which ran from 2007 to 2011, and Coastwise, which began in 2022 and is scheduled to run until 2027.

== Archaeology ==
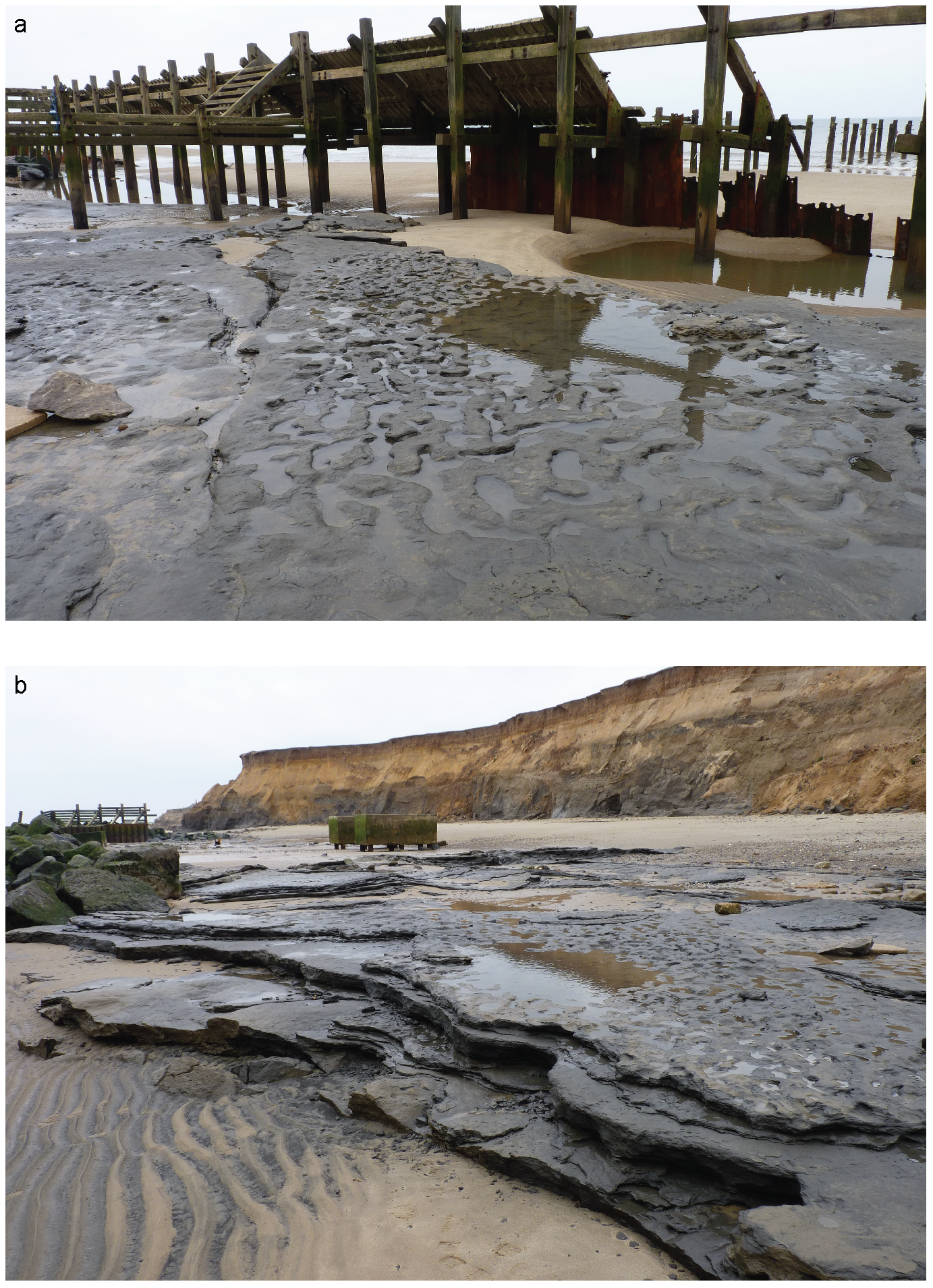
Photographs of Area A at Happisburgh, showing: (a) view of Happisburgh footprints surface looking north; and (b) view of footprint surface looking south, also showing underlying horizontally bedded laminated silts

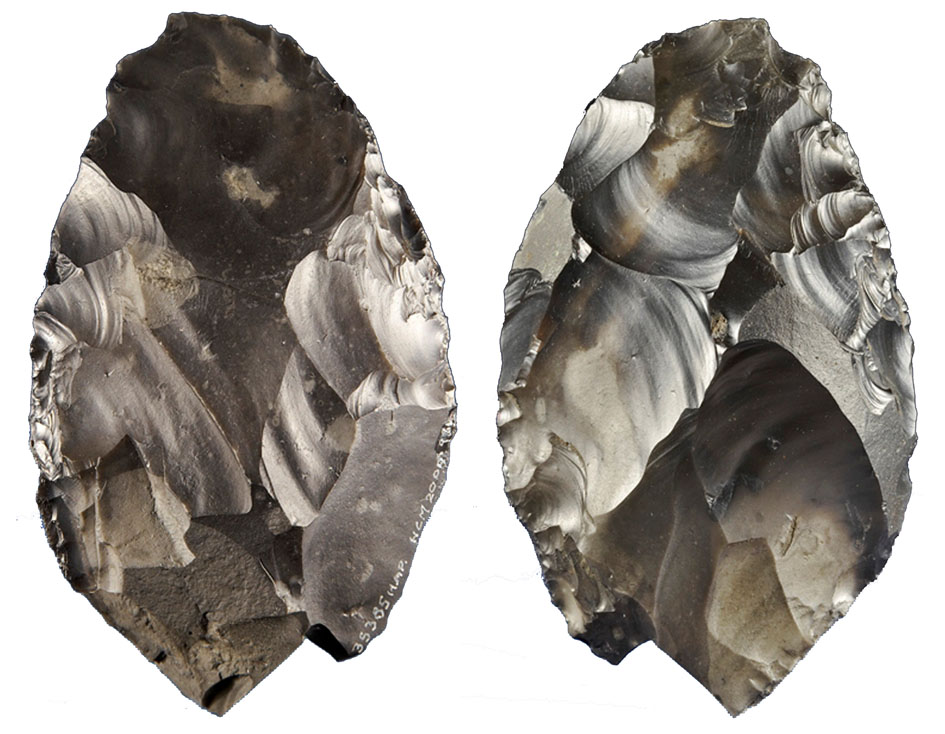
The Happisburgh Handaxe, found on the beach between Happisburgh and Cart Gap in 2000.

In 2000, a local dog walker found a flint tool embedded in clay on the foreshore between Happisburgh and Cart Gap. Subsequently named the Happisburgh Handaxe, its discovery led to the beach at Happisburgh becoming a site of global archaeological importance. The Happisburgh Handaxe is now on permanent display at Norwich Castle Museum.

In 2010, Simon Parfitt and colleagues from University College London published a paper stating that they had discovered flint tools near Happisburgh. The tools were dated to "somewhere between 866,000 to 814,000 years ago or 970,000 to 936,000 years ago", around 100,000 years earlier than finds at Pakefield. The flints were probably left by hunter-gatherers of the human species Homo antecessor who inhabited the flood plains and marshlands that bordered an ancient course of the river Thames. The flints were then washed downriver and came to rest at the Happisburgh site.

In May 2013, the Happisburgh footprints, the oldest human footprints found outside of Africa, being more than 800,000 years old, were reported to have been discovered on the beach.

== Folklore ==
There is a local legend dating from the 16th century that Happisburgh is haunted by the ghost of a murdered smuggler. The ghost was reported as having no legs, and its head hanging behind its back by a thin strip of flesh. The legend says that the smuggler's mutilated body was found in a well, once located at Pump Hill Corner, at the junction of Whimpwell Green and Coronation Road, hence its name, 'The Pump Hill Ghost' (also known as the 'Happisburgh Torso' and the 'Happisburgh Smuggler').

== Notable residents ==
- Richard Porson (1759–1808), classical scholar
- Jonathan Balls (1769–1846), serial killer
- Charles William Peach (1800–1886), naturalist and geologist
- Ernest Richard Suffling (1855–1911), stained glass artist and author
- Percy Edward Pinkerton (1855–1946), English translator and poet
- Alex Windsor (born 1993), female professional wrestler who grew up in Happisburgh

== Happisburgh in culture ==
The lighthouse features in the first line of the folk song 'Windy Old Weather': "As we were a-fishin' off Happisburgh Light, Shootin' and haulin' and trawlin' all night." Classified as number 472 in the Roud Folk Song Index, the song dates from at least as early as the nineteenth century. Early audio field recordings include performances by Harry Cox from nearby Catfield in 1953 and Sam Larner, from Winterton in 1959.

The cipher used by Sir Arthur Conan Doyle in the Sherlock Holmes short story the Adventure of the Dancing Men

Sir Arthur Conan Doyle was inspired to write The Adventure of the Dancing Men while staying at the Hill House Inn in 1903.

The sculptors Henry Moore and Barbara Hepworth were among a group of artists that stayed at Church Farm in the early 1930s. There, they experimented with carving the smooth ironstone pebbles found on the beach, which is said to have had an influence on their respective styles.

In 1972, director Lawrence Gordon Clark filmed scenes in Happisburgh in his adaptation of the M. R. James tale 'A Warning to the Curious' for the BBC's A Ghost Story for Christmas series. It has been described as one of television's most terrifying films, and Clark praised for his use of the East Anglian landscape.

An episode of the BBC TV programme Challenge Anneka was filmed in the village in 1990, where the presenter Anneka Rice was tasked with painting the lighthouse in 33 hours. A story that the wrong kind of paint was used for the repainting was reported in the national press. This was later dismissed as a myth by Happisburgh Lighthouse Trust which stated that the story originated in a newspaper report of 1996 and that the correct materials had been used.

== See also ==
- Happisburgh Cliffs
- Coastal erosion at Happisburgh

Local offshore sandbanks dangerous to shipping:

- Hammond's Knoll
- Haisborough Sands

== Gallery ==
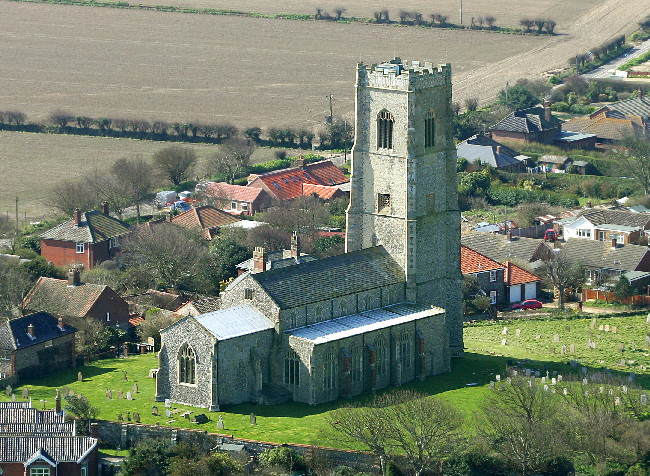
Saint Mary's, Happisburgh

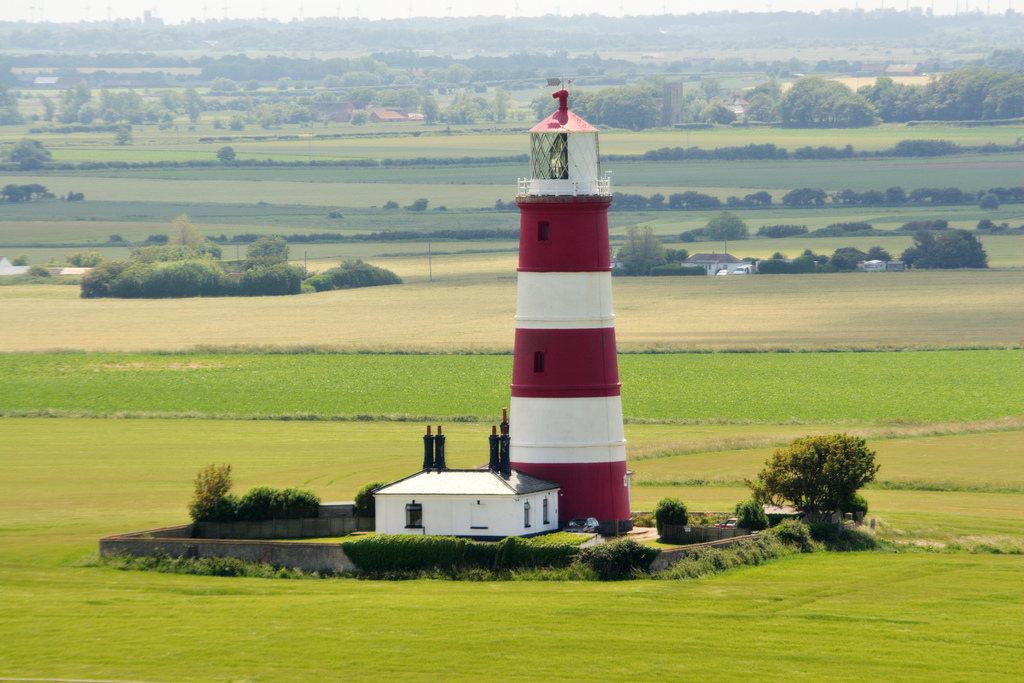
The lighthouse at Happisburgh

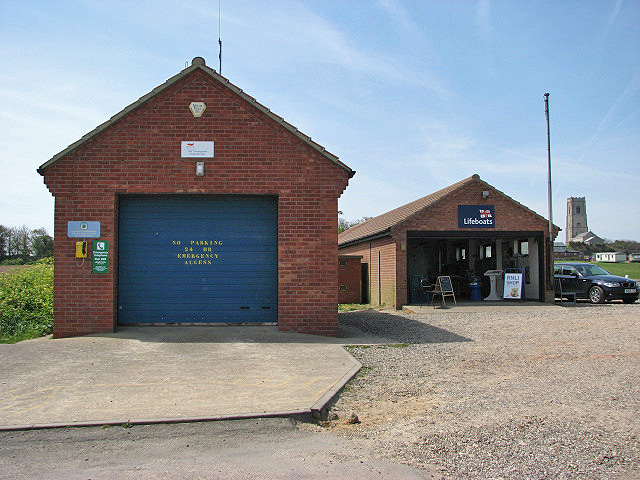
Happisburgh's old lifeboat station and Royal National Lifeboat Institution shop

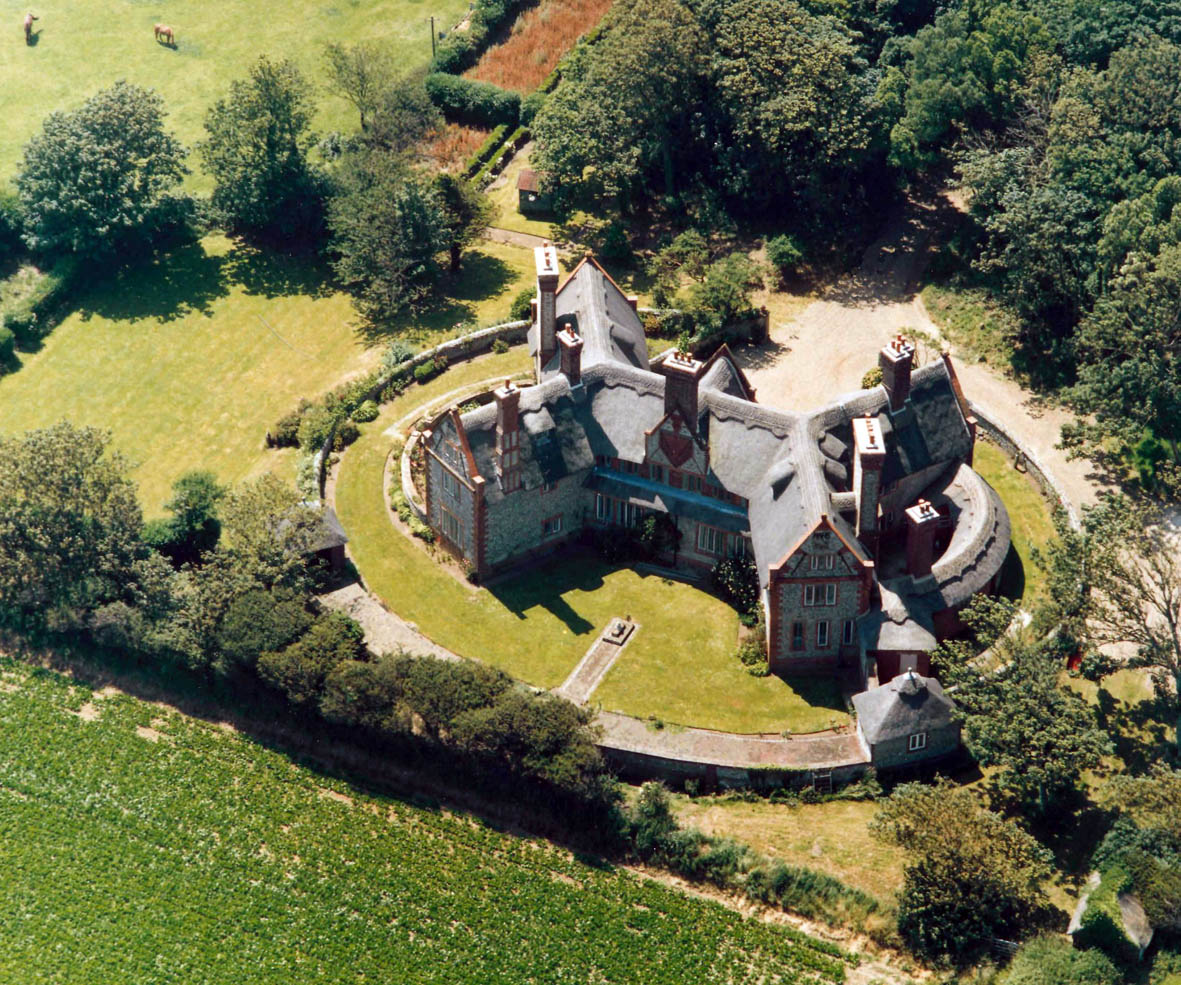
Happisburgh Manor (c.1992)

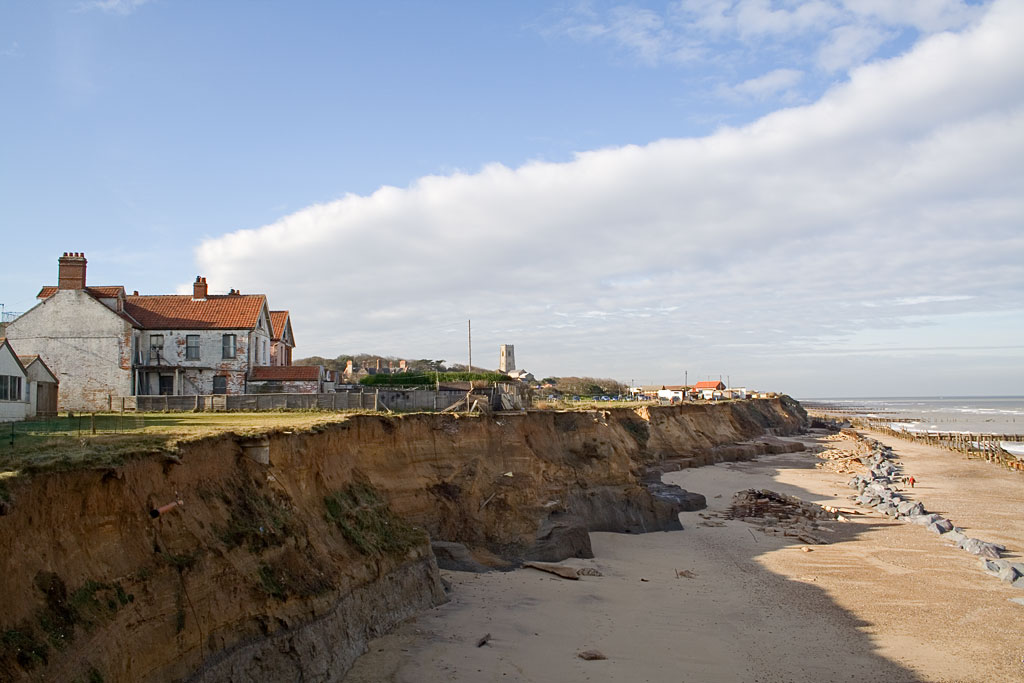
The precarious position of houses due to the effects of coastal erosion

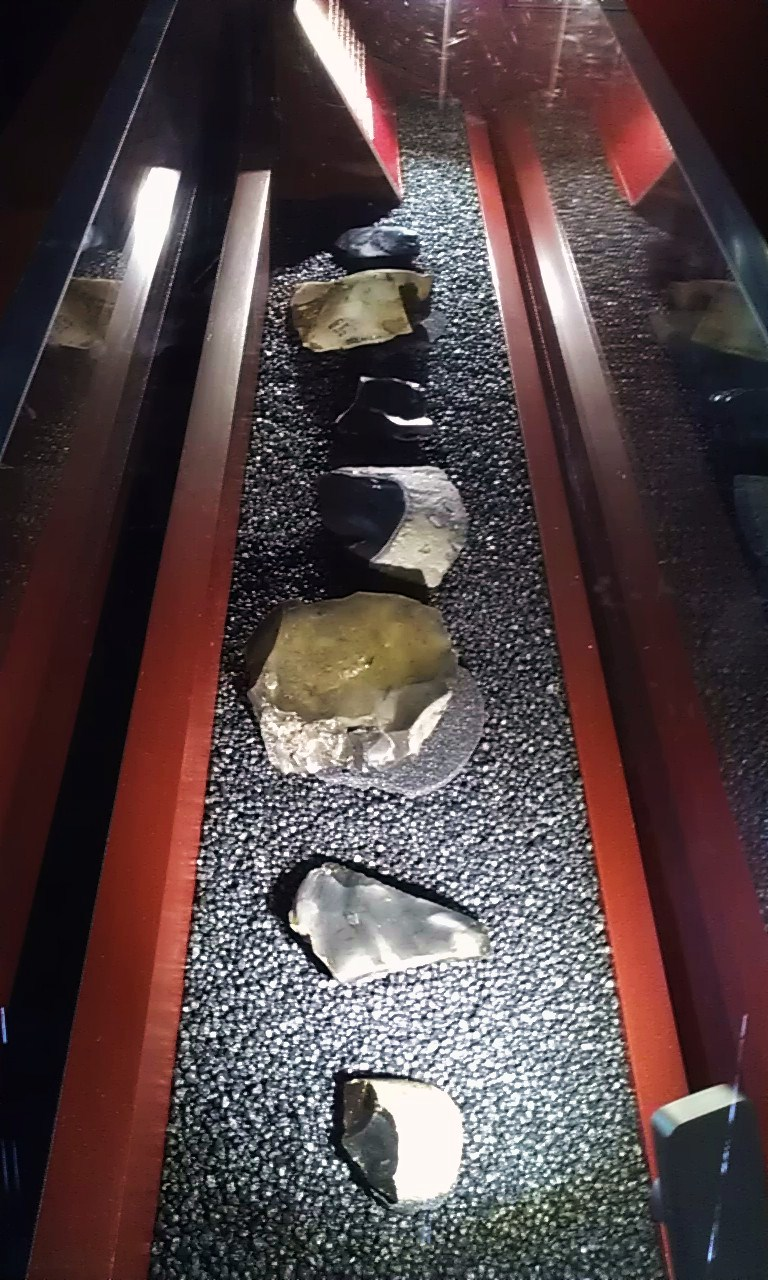
Stone tools discovered at Happisburgh
