= East Ruston =

Village in Norfolk, England

Coordinates: 52.79682°N 1.476420°E

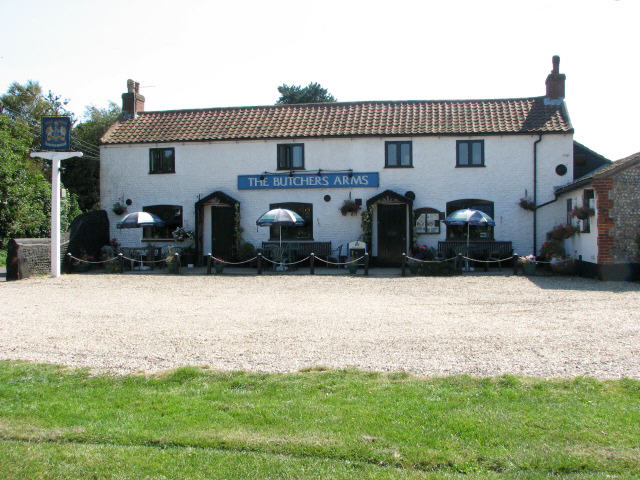
- The Butchers Arms, East Ruston

- Location within Norfolk
- Area: 5.15 sq mi (13.3 km^{2})
- Population: 595 (2021 census, including Brumstead
  - Density: 116/sq mi (45/km^{2})
- OS grid reference: TG344278
  - London: 136 miles (219 km)
- Civil parish: East Ruston CP
- District: North Norfolk
- Shire county: Norfolk
- Region: East
- Country: England
- Sovereign state: United Kingdom
- Post town: NORWICH
- Postcode district: NR12
- Dialling code: 01692
- Police: Norfolk
- Fire: Norfolk
- Ambulance: East of England
- UK Parliament: North Norfolk

East Ruston is a village and a civil parish in the English county of Norfolk.

The village is located 4.1 miles (6.6 km) south-east of North Walsham and 14 miles (23 km) north-east of Norwich.

== History ==
East Ruston's name is of Anglo-Saxon origin and derives from the Old English for the eastern brushwood farm or settlement.

In the Domesday Book, East Ruston is listed as a settlement of 87 households in the hundred of Happing. In 1086, the village formed part of the East Anglian estates of Ralph Baynard.

In 1758, East Ruston post mill was built and remained in operation until it fell into dereliction after the Second World War. A further tower mill was built in 1868 and operated by Horace Turner. The machinery was removed from the mill in the 1960s with the building still standing.

During the Second World War, East Ruston was the location of British Army roadblocks and a reserve training area in preparation for resistance of a German invasion of England.

== Geography ==
According to the 2021 census, East Ruston has a population of 595 people which shows no deviation from the 595 people recorded in the 2011 census.

The closest railway station to East Ruston is Worstead which provides Bittern Line services to Sheringham and Norwich. The nearest airport is Norwich International Airport.

== Church of St. Mary ==
East Ruston's parish church is dedicated to Saint Mary and dates from the Fourteenth Century, though it has been significantly re-modelled and restored in the Victorian era. St. Mary's is located outside of the village on the side of the B1159 and has been Grade II listed since 1955.

St. Mary's has been in the care of the Churches Conservation Trust since the 1980s. There are good examples of Nineteenth Century stained glass, particularly a depiction of the Presentation of Christ by A. L. Moore as well as a font that was recut in the 1880s.

== Amenities ==
The public house is called the Butchers Arms. East Ruston is the home to the noted East Ruston Old Vicarage garden which is open to the public.

== Notable residents ==
- Richard Porson- (1759–1808) classicist, born in East Ruston.

== In popular culture ==
East Ruston is named as Abe Slaney's hiding place in Sir Arthur Conan Doyle's Sherlock Holmes story, The Adventure of the Dancing Men.

== Governance ==
East Ruston is part of the electoral ward of Happisburgh for local elections and is part of the district of North Norfolk.

The village's national constituency is North Norfolk, which has been represented by the Liberal Democrat Steff Aquarone MP since 2024.

== War memorial ==
East Ruston War Memorial is a short stone plinth topped with a Celtic cross in St. Mary's Churchyard. It lists the following names for the First World War:

| Rank | Name | Unit | Date of death | Burial/Commemoration |
|---|---|---|---|---|
| 2Lt. | Walter J. Brumbley MC (Note: Brumbley was awarded the Military Cross for an action in March 1918 when he personally led a raiding party into enemy lines.) | 3rd Bn., Norfolk Regiment | 27 Mar. 1918 | Pozieres Memorial |
| St1C | Reginald Bristow | HMS Bacchante | 21 Feb. 1919 | St. Mary's Churchyard |
| Pte. | Frederick J. Hilling | 4th Bn., Bedfordshire Regiment | 16 Jan. 1918 | Mont-Huon Cemetery |
| Pte. | Frederick G. Rump | 6th Bn., The Buffs | 9 Aug. 1918 | Franvillers Cemetery |
| Pte. | George W. Riches | 12th Bn., Cornwall Light Infantry | 24 Jan. 1917 | Bray Military Cemetery |
| Pte. | Leslie W. Pointer | 1/9th Bn., Durham Light Infantry | 5 Nov. 1916 | Thiepval Memorial |
| Pte. | John Helsdon | 1st Bn., Essex Regiment | 12 Oct. 1916 | Thiepval Memorial |
| Pte. | Clarence H. Pratt | 8th Bn., Royal Fusiliers | 7 Oct. 1916 | Beaulencourt Cemetery |
| Pte. | John R. Hemp | 1st Bn., Norfolk Regiment | 15 Jan. 1916 | Carnoy Military Cemetery |
| Pte. | James Riches | 1st Bn., Norfolk Regt. | 9 Oct. 1917 | Tyne Cot |
| Pte. | Walter J. Cutting | 1/5th Bn., Norfolk Regt. | 19 Apr. 1917 | Gaza War Cemetery |
| Pte. | Edmund W. Eaton | 8th Bn., Norfolk Regt. | 1 Jul. 1916 | Thiepval Memorial |
| Pte. | Charles E. Larkins | 9th Bn., Norfolk Regt. | 15 Sep. 1916 | Guillemont Road Cem. |
| Spr. | R. Percy Taylor | 128th Coy., Royal Engineers | 1 Sep. 1917 | Lijssenthoek Cemetery |
| Spr. | William H. Ward | 209th Coy., R.E. | 3 Jul. 1916 | Thiepval Memorial |
| 2hd. | Robert Spanton | H.M. Drifter Young Fred | 21 Jan. 1917 | St. Mary's Churchyard |
| Dhd. | A. William Shepherd | H.M. Trawler Tugela | 26 Jun. 1916 | Chatham Naval Memorial |
| Tmr. | Cecil V. Grimmer | HMS Attentive III | 26 Mar. 1917 | St. Mary's Churchyard |

And, the following for the Second World War:

| Rank | Name | Unit | Date of death | Burial |
|---|---|---|---|---|
| Sgt. | Matthew Sculfer | No. 21 Squadron RAF | 11 Jun. 1940 | Boulleville Cemetery |
| Sgt. | Jack Dixon | No. 153 Squadron RAF | 6 Mar. 1945 | Olsany Cemetery |
| Pte. | Robert F. Pestell | Royal Army Ordnance Corps | 27 Jul. 1943 | Kanchanaburi War Cemetery |
