= Great Ellingham =

Village in Norfolk, England

Coordinates: 52.5353°N 0.9761°E

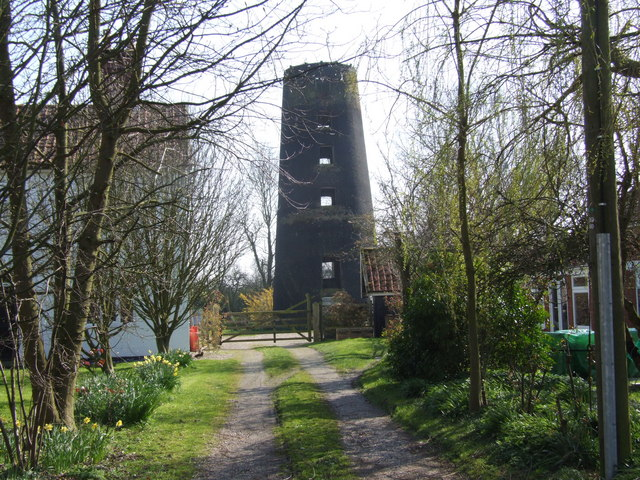
- Great Ellingham Windmill

- Location within Norfolk
- Area: 4.30 sq mi (11.1 km^{2})
- Population: 1,267 (2021 census)
  - Density: 295/sq mi (114/km^{2})
- OS grid reference: TM0194197215
- District: Breckland
- Shire county: Norfolk
- Region: East
- Country: England
- Sovereign state: United Kingdom
- Post town: ATTLEBOROUGH
- Postcode district: NR17
- Dialling code: 01953
- Police: Norfolk
- Fire: Norfolk
- Ambulance: East of England
- UK Parliament: South West Norfolk

Great Ellingham is a village and civil parish in the English county of Norfolk.

Great Ellingham is located 2.2 miles (3.5 km) north-west of Attleborough and 15 miles (24 km) south-west of Norwich. The civil parish also includes the hamlets of Bow Street and Stalland Common.

== History ==
Great Dunham's name is of Anglo-Saxon origin and derives from the Old English for the larger settlement of Ella or Eli's people.

In the Domesday Book, Great Ellingham is listed as a settlement of 47 households in the hundred of Shropham. In 1086, the village was part of the East Anglian estates of Henry de Ferrers and Ralph de Beaufour.

Several Fifteenth Century buildings have survived in Great Ellingham including Mill Farmhouse, Tannery Farm and Ye Olde Thatche Shoppe.

Great Ellingham Windmill was built in 1849 and ceased working in 1922. Today, the windmill is in the process of redevelopment.

RAF Deopham Green spills into the parish of Great Ellingham which was home to the 452nd Bomb Wing of the US Eighth Air Force.

== Geography ==
According to the 2021 census, Great Ellingham has a population of 1,267 people which shows an increase from the 1,132 people recorded in the 2011 census.

Great Ellingham is located on the B1077, between Carbrooke and Ipswich.

== St. James' Church ==
Great Ellingham's church is dedicated to Saint James and dates from the Fourteenth Century. The church is located within the village on Church Street and has been Grade I listed since 1958. St. James' remains open for Sunday services once a month.

St. James' was heavily restored in the Victorian era as well as stained-glass installed by King & Son of Norwich.

== Amenities ==
Great Ellingham Primary is part of the Great Ellingham & Rocklands Schools Federation.

The Crown Pub has stood in the parish since 1784. The pub remains open to this day.

== Teddy Bear Festival ==
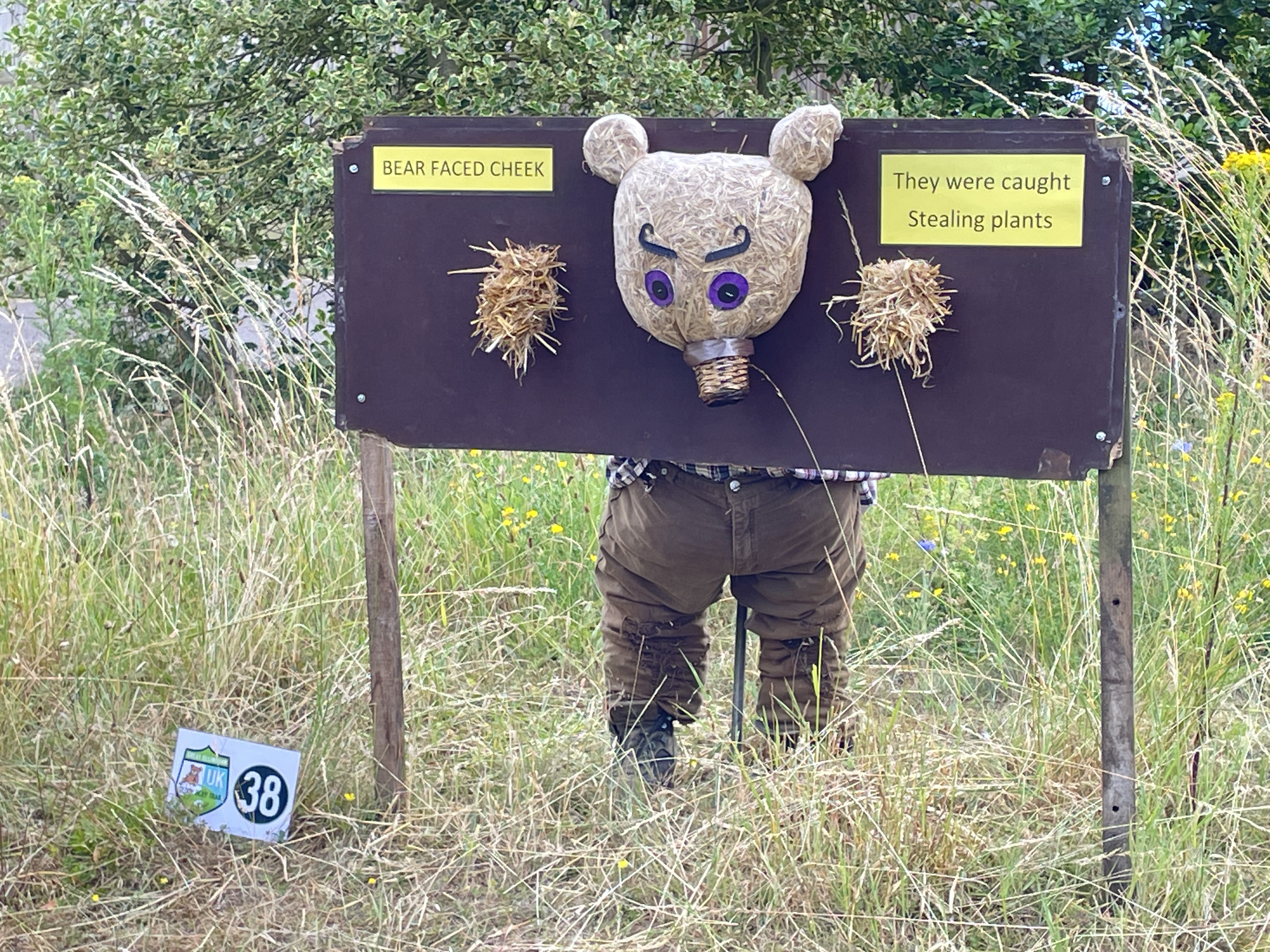
Example of Teddy Bear competition entrants

The village is locally renowned for its annual Teddy Bear Festival, which runs for two weeks in July. Alongside other events, villagers build and display straw bears in their gardens to create a "Teddy Bear Trail". Since the start of the festival in 2004, around £50,000 has been raised for local good causes and charities.

== Governance ==
Great Ellingham is part of the electoral ward of All Saints & Wayland for local elections and is part of the district of Breckland.

The village's national constituency is South West Norfolk which has been represented by Labour's Terry Jermy MP since 2024.

== War Memorial ==
Great Ellingham's war memorial is built into the wall of St. James' Churchtower and lists the following names for the First World War:

| Rank | Name | Unit | Date of death | Burial/Commemoration |
|---|---|---|---|---|
| POSt. | Edward W. J. Hannan | HMS Black Prince | 31 May 1916 | Portsmouth Memorial |
| Sgt. | Charles F. Bilverstone | 182nd Coy., Machine Gun Corps | 8 Aug. 1916 | Loos Memorial |
| Pte. | George R. Saunders | 2nd Bn., Bedfordshire Regiment | 29 Aug. 1918 | Combles Cemetery |
| Pte. | Edward V. P. Rosher | 4th Bn., Bedfordshire Regt. | 23 Apr. 1917 | Arras Memorial |
| Pte. | George R. Wilkins | 1st Bn., The Buffs | 15 Sep. 1916 | Thiepval Memorial |
| Pte. | Ernest E. Saunders | 11th Bn., Essex Regiment | 28 May 1918 | Voormezeele Enclosures |
| Pte. | Arthur J. Groom | 8th Bn., Royal Fusiliers | 28 Dec. 1916 | Cambrai Memorial |
| Pte. | Henry Leverett | 11th Bn., Middlesex Regiment | 12 May 1917 | Arras Memorial |
| Pte. | John J. Reeder | 1st Bn., Norfolk Regiment | 4 Sep. 1916 | Thiepval Memorial |
| Pte. | John Lincoln | 2nd Bn., Norfolk Regt. | 15 Dec. 1916 | Haydarpaşa Cemetery |
| Pte. | Ernest J. Barham | 1/5th Bn., Norfolk Regt. | 2 Nov. 1917 | Gaza War Cemetery |
| Pte. | Alfred H. Beales | 1/5th Bn., Norfolk Regt. | 19 Apr. 1917 | Jerusalem Memorial |
| Pte. | Albert E. Fox | 8th Bn., Norfolk Regt. | 1 Jul. 1916 | Carnoy Military Cemetery |
| Pte. | Arthur Hall | 9th Bn., Norfolk Regt. | 15 Sep. 1916 | Thiepval Memorial |
| Pte. | Sidney Hoy | 9th Bn., Norfolk Regt. | 18 Oct. 1918 | St. Sever Cemetery |
| Pte. | Arthur Macro | 2/7th Bn., Warwickshire Regiment | 6 Jun. 1918 | Hamburg Cemetery |

The following names were added after the Second World War:

| Rank | Name | Unit | Date of death | Burial/Commemoration |
|---|---|---|---|---|
| Cpl. | Alec G. W. Dove | 6th Bn., Royal Norfolk Regiment | 6 Dec. 1943 | Chungkai War Cemetery |
| A2C | Dora M. Hudson | Women's Auxiliary Air Force | 21 Aug. 1943 | St. James' Churchyard |
| Mne. | Arthur L. Stubbings | Royal Marines att. HMS Repulse | 10 Dec. 1941 | Plymouth Naval Memorial |
| Pte. | Basil F. Daniels | 4th Bn., Royal Norfolk Regiment | 11 Feb. 1942 | Kranji War Cemetery |
| Pte. | Robert P. Etheridge | 4th Bn., Royal Norfolks | 13 Feb. 1942 | Kranji War Memorial |
| Pte. | Stanley F. Giles | 4th Bn., Royal Norfolks | 14 Dec. 1942 | Chungkai War Cemetery |
