= Coastal erosion at Happisburgh =

Village with a history of coastal erosion in Norfolk, England

The village of Happisburgh in north east Norfolk, England, is well known for being affected by coastal erosion. Between 1988 and 2025, 35 residential properties were lost to coastal change with a further three demolished in 2026. Agricultural land has also been lost. These losses are due in part to the deterioration of the sea defences. Government policy now focuses on adapting to change, rather than investing in new defences.

Road over a cliff at Happisburgh by G Laird 2014. This was once the road to the old beach access at 'Town Gap'.

== Historic erosion ==
Land has been lost to the sea in the area for thousands of years, since the last ice age, meaning Happisburgh was once inland. The medieval settlement of Whimpwell, recorded in the Domesday Book (1086) as part of the parish of Happisburgh, is believed to have existed to the east of the current coastline. Whimpwell is reported to have been lost to the sea by 1183, the name living on in Whimpwell Street in Happisburgh village centre, and the hamlet Whimpwell Green.

The average rate of erosion between 1885 and 1907 was 0.8 metres (2.6 ft) per year. Between 1907 and 1950, it was approximately 0.4 metres (1.3 ft) year.

=== 20th century ===
Following the North Sea Flood of 1953, which killed 307 people in the UK, including seven along the coast at Sea Palling, the British Government made major investments in new sea defences. The construction of Happisburgh's new defences started in 1959. These consisted of wooden revetments, parallel to the cliffs along the shoreline, and groynes at regular intervals at right angles to the shoreline. In the 1980s a concrete sea wall was built between 'Low Light', the area of beach where Happisburgh's second lighthouse once stood, and Cart Gap, completing the village's defences. The wooden defences were maintained up until the 1990s. Deterioration of the defences in the 1990s resulted in a period of rapid erosion along one section of the cliff line, 50 metres (160 ft) between 1996 and 1999, creating an embayment which has since stabilised.

=== 21st century ===
Planned new defence schemes in the early 2000s did not proceed for a number of reasons. In March 2007, when North Norfolk District Council was conducting emergency works by placing rock armour on the beach, a community group enabled the extension of the amount of rock placed on the beach by 20 percent through a fundraising campaign.

Changes in national policy mean Happisburgh no longer meets the criteria to have defences funded from central government. In 2012 the current shoreline management plan for Happisburgh was adopted (Kelling Hard to Lowestoft SMP6). The policy for Happisburgh is now 'managed realignment', under which the intention is for a natural shoreline to develop. Previously the policy was 'hold the line'.

In January 2025, the Environment Agency published revised projections for coastal erosion around the UK. These can be examined using an interactive tool available on the UK Government website and take into account the predicted sea level rise due to climate change.

== Pilot adaptation schemes ==
=== Pathfinder ===
The first of two pilot adaptation schemes that the village has been involved in, Pathfinder, ran from 2009 to 2011. Nine properties were bought by the council as part of the project at 40% of their market value and demolished in 2012. The caravan park was also relocated to a site inland. A new community car park was built next to a new beach access ramp with reusable materials to allow relocation at a later date.

==== Coastwise ====
The Coastwise project, part of the Environment Agency and DEFRA Coastal Transition Accelerator Programme began in 2022 and is scheduled to run to 2029. Three properties at immediate risk of erosion were demolished in April 2026 by North Norfolk District Council through the Coastwise project.

== See also ==
- Coastal erosion in Yorkshire
