= Bray-sur-Somme =

- Commune
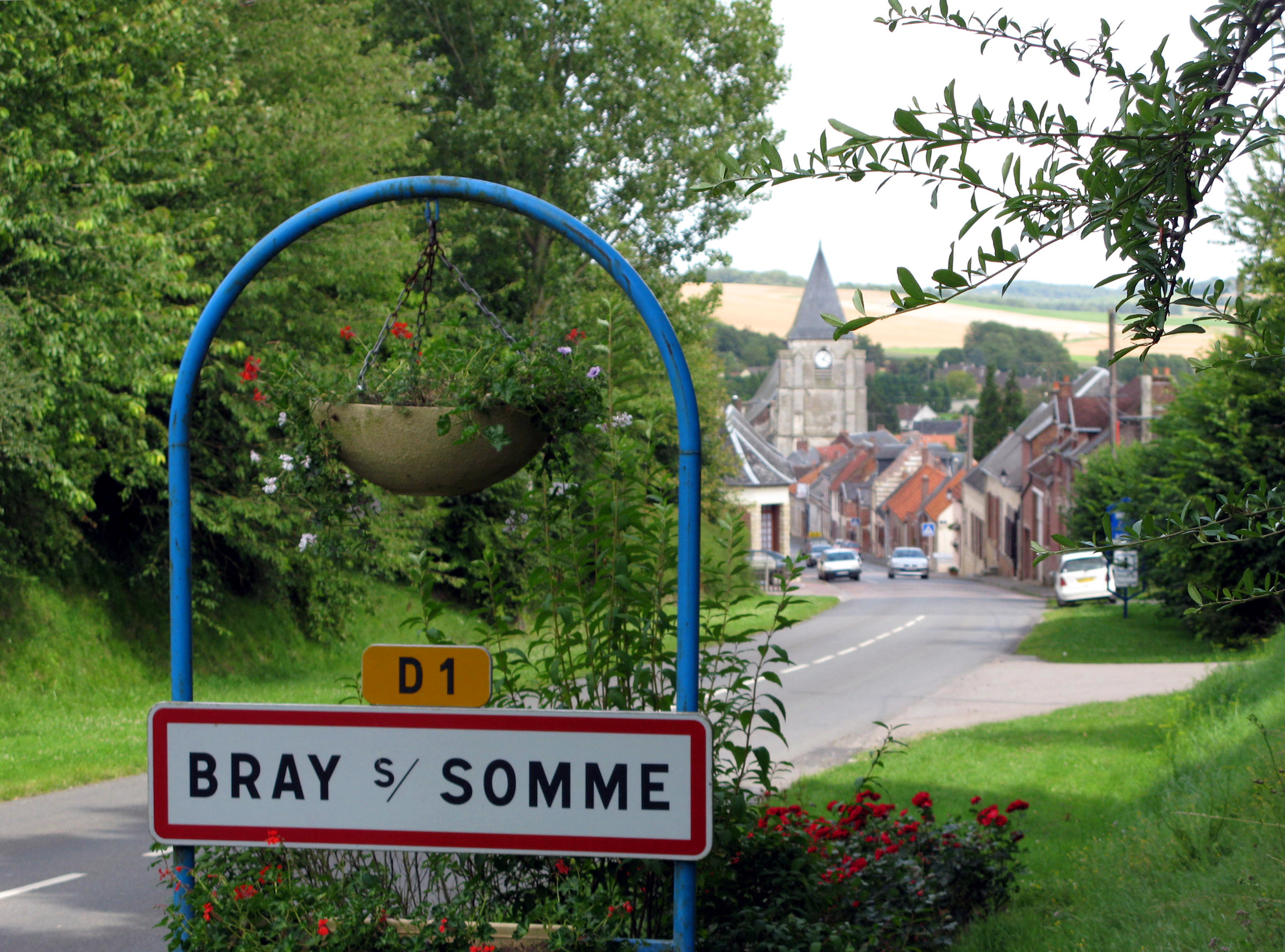
- The road into Bray

- Coat of arms
- Location of Bray-sur-Somme
- Location within France Location within Hauts-de-France
- Coordinates: 49°56′28″N 2°43′06″E
- Country: France
- Region: Hauts-de-France
- Department: Somme
- Arrondissement: Péronne
- Canton: Albert
- Intercommunality: Pays du Coquelicot

Government
  - Mayor (2024–2026): Ludovic Goblet
- Area^{1}: 16.81 km^{2} (6.49 sq mi)
- Elevation: 45 m (148 ft)
- Highest elevation: 122 m (400 ft)
- Lowest elevation: 32 m (105 ft)
- Population (2023): 1,184
  - Density: 70.43/km^{2} (182.4/sq mi)
- Time zone: UTC+01:00 (CET)
  - Summer (DST): UTC+02:00 (CEST)
- INSEE/Postal code: 80136 /80340
- ^{1} French Land Register data, which excludes lakes, ponds, glaciers > 1 km^{2} (0.386 sq mi or 247 acres) and river estuaries.

Bray-sur-Somme (French pronunciation: [bʁɛ syʁ sɔm], literally Bray on Somme) is a commune in the Somme department in Hauts-de-France in northern France.

== Twin towns ==
It is twinned with Inkberrow.

== Geography ==
The communes is situated on the D1 and D329 road junction, some 20 miles (32 km) east-northeast of Amiens.

The commune is surrounded by hills to the east and to the west. To the south, the marshes are crossed by the Somme. The town has been a strategic location over the centuries thanks to the four fords crossing the river here, the old boundary between Artois and Picardy.

== Population ==
Historical population
Year	Pop.	±% p.a.
1968	1,226	—
1975	1,242	+0.19%
1982	1,220	−0.25%
1990	1,320	+0.99%
1999	1,316	−0.03%
2007	1,270	−0.44%
2012	1,208	−1.00%
2017	1,276	+1.10%
2023	1,184	−1.24%
Source: INSEE

== Etymology ==
Bray is a place name of Celtic origin meaning "marshy land". The name Braium has been documented since about 630.

== History ==
=== Early times ===
Archeological searches have established that the area had Gallic and Roman occupation, confirmed by the weapons and various domestic objects found in and around Bray. In 630, Braium was under the domain of the abbey of St-Riquier. In 868, under the reign of Charles the Bald, a fortress controlled this part of the Somme upstream to Corbie and Amiens. Hugh Capet placed the town under the control of the neighbouring town of Péronne. In 1210, King Philip II Augustus granted the commune a "community charter".

=== Middle Ages ===
The city was protected to the west and north by walls and deep ditches. To the east, an earthen embankment and palisade, surrounded by marsh and small watercourses, provided the protection. Four gates, each with a portcullis, guarded entry to the town,

As with many fortified towns in this part of France, Bray suffered fire, bombardment and destruction over the centuries, as French kings fought to expand their lands against the Norman English and the Spanish-led Holy Roman Empire.

=== World War I ===
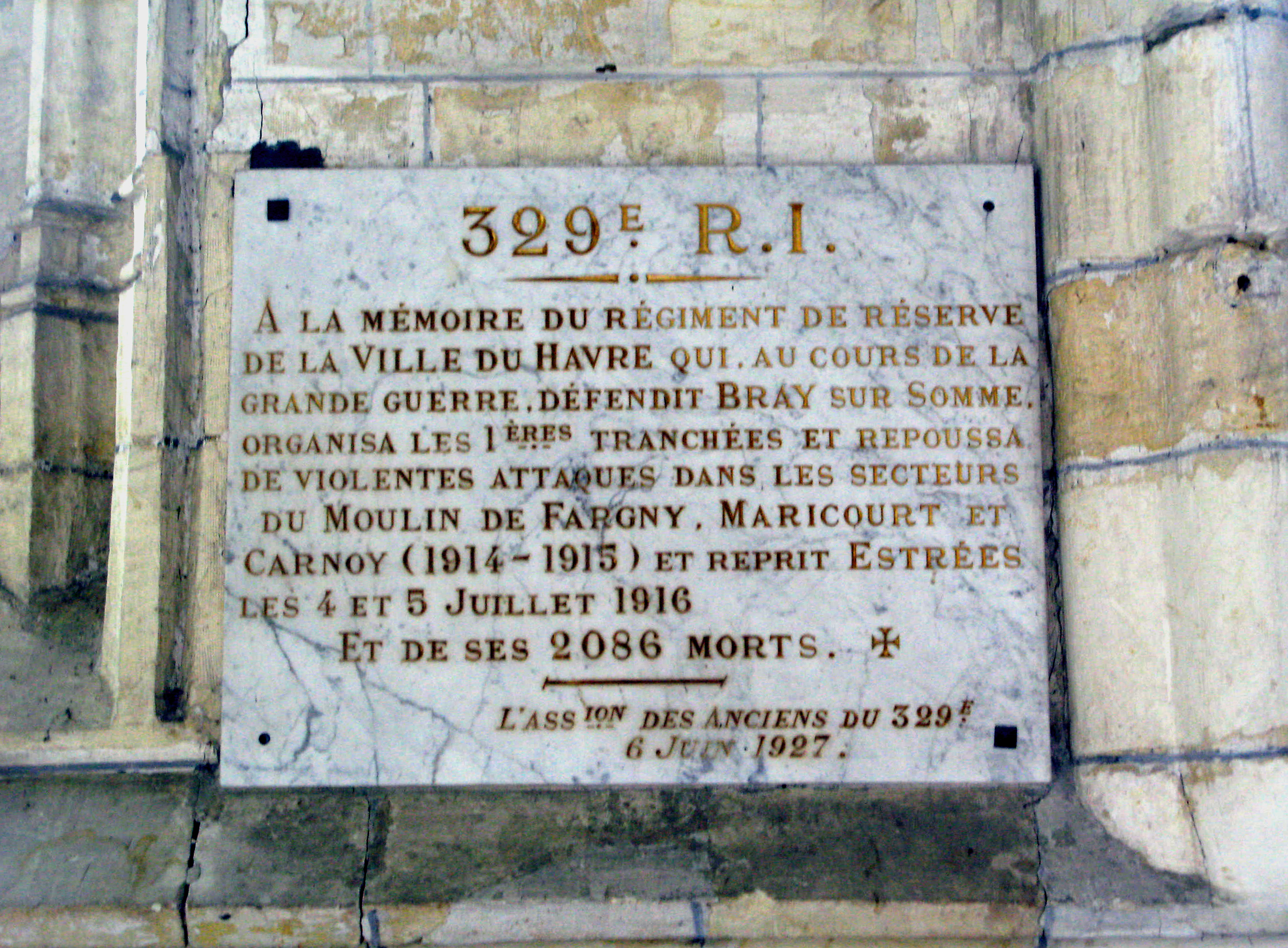
Memorial to the 329th Infantry Regiment

The Imperial German Army initially occupied Bray in late August 1914 during the so-called Race to the Sea, invading from the south following the Proyart road. Apart from requisitioning some wagons, in the first month the town was not too badly disturbed. However, as the Germans continued their thrust during the Battle of Albert 25–29 September 1914, Bray attracted heavy bombing, compelling the Germans to evacuate on 4 October. As a result, the frontline reformed to the north and east of the town, in the shape of an arc delineated by the towns of Fricourt, Carnoy, Curlu, Friesland, Herbecourt and Dompierre-Becquincourt. For the next 28 months Bray served as an important centre for rest and recuperation for the French Army. The 329e Régiment d'Infanterie, who were reservists from Le Havre, were based around Bray between 15 October 1914 and 18 April 1915. In February 1915, the stained glass windows and the bell tower of Bray's Church of St Nicolas were damaged by German shelling. On 17 March, units of the 329e R.I. — the 17e, 21e and 24e companies strengthened by a section of the 18th company, as well as the 236e R.I. vigorously resisted a strong German attack, which stopped the Germans. In the sector of Carnoy, the loss to the 329e I.R. amounted to 47 killed, 96 wounded and 6 missing. During the course of The Great War the 329e R.I. lost 2097 men: 58 officers, 158 sub-officers and 1881 non-commissioned officers and men. The regiment would suffer even more during the Battle of the Somme in July 1916 to the north east of Bray in the area of Estrées. A commemorative plaque is affixed in the Church of St. Nicolas commemorating the loss of 2086 men of the regiment in The Great War as testimony to their sacrifice. Bray became an important supply dump for munitions and materiel during the build-up and throughout the Battle of the Somme.

On 21 March 1918 the Germans launched a massive spring offensive, code named Operation Michael, which brought Bray close to the firing line yet again, this time under British Army jurisdiction. On 26 March the increasingly desperate British Army managed to achieve some success in stemming the German advance to the north-west of Bray at Colincamps, by the injection of the New Zealand Division and the British 3rd Tank battalion, who had decisively deployed twelve of the first Whippet Tanks to be used in action. However, despite this, Bray and its key Somme River crossings were prematurely abandoned without contest to the Germans due to poor communication. As a result, for the next four months the Germans would be utilising Bray as a major forward supply base and communications hub, once again making it the target of attention, in the form of periodic long range artillery and aerial bombing by both French & British forces.

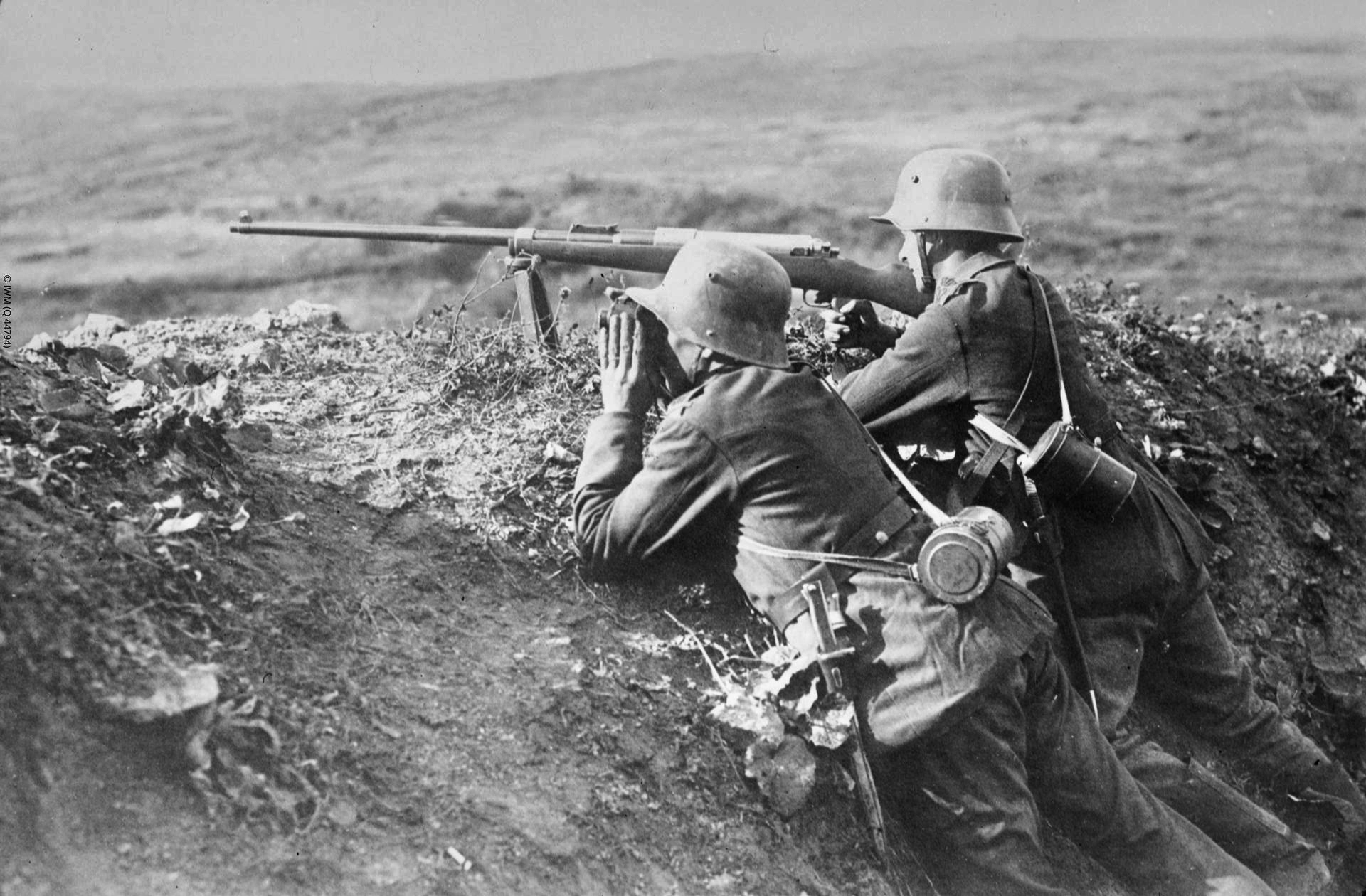
German T-Gewehr anti-tank rifle team of Infanterie-Regiment Nr.124 of 27 Württemberg Infanterie-Division, France, late summer-autumn 1918

By the fourth week of August 1918, in what proved to be the most sweltering heat of the year, the Hundred Days Offensive brought Bray-sur-Somme back into the immediate front line for the final time, this time involving Australian forces attacking trenches manned by the 27. Infanterie-Division and remnants of the 43. Reserve-Infanterie-Division. The 27. Inf. Div. was a veteran elite unit recruited in Württemberg, which had fought the Australians the year before at Bullecourt, inflicting significant losses. 43.R.I.D. was another veteran unit, which was recruited from the reserve of the elite Prussian Guard and had served on numerous fronts since 1914. In the period leading up to its arrival on the Somme in early June 1918, this division had suffered particularly - not only from the great 1918 flu pandemic, but also a typhoid epidemic while it was resting in Lille. It further suffered disastrous losses attempting to defend the line against Australian Imperial Forces, American infantry and British Mk V tanks during the Battle of Hamel on 4 July. As a result, the 43.R.I.D. had already been rated third class in fighting ability by the time it had been assigned the defence of Bray. Despite this, on 22 August using a combination of accurate & determined machine gun fire, shelling and poison gas the division managed to break up a night time attack by the 33rd, 34th & 35th Battalions AIF and 3rd Pioneer Battalion AIF, who had tried to capture Bray from the north. The 3rd Pioneer Battalion, however, had been able to occupy the cliff on the south-western fringe overlooking the town, which enabled accurate spotting of artillery and Stokes mortar fire into the town. Elements of the Australian 13th Light Horse Regiment had also been brought up with a view to deploying them in the event of a breakthrough; however, it ultimately performed its usual role doing scouting, messaging and prisoner escort duties.

Early on the night of 24 August, the 3rd Pioneers and men of the 37th & 40th Battalions AIF began a fresh push into the town from the west behind a rolling artillery barrage, which further damaged Bray in the process. As was typical all along the Western Front, highly trained German machine gunners, shelling and poison gas were used once again in an attempt to repel the Australians. By the end of the day, however, the devastated town was finally liberated by the 40th Battalion AIF, who had managed to infiltrate it from three directions, using Stokes mortars to suppress German machine guns, most notably at Bray's railway yard. As the Germans were enveloped some became uncertain of their positions, allowing the Australians to trick some Germans by mimicking their calls and drawing them out of cover and into captivity. All told 186 Germans were captured in Bray, with the majority of prisoners coming from the Reserve-Infanterie-Regiment 202. and Reserve-Infanterie-Regiment 203. of the 43.R.I.D., but some men from the 25.Infanterie-Division and 27.Infanterie-Division were also captured. An unknown number of Germans were killed. Of the Australians, there were 74 casualties, although only 3 were killed. No civilian casualties appear to be recorded, presumably as they would have already been evacuated. Considerable stores were seized in the railway yard, partly loaded onto carriages and mined by the Germans with the unfulfilled intention of destroying them. The town was burning and subject to vicious shelling by Germans who had formed a new defensive line on the hill to the east. Thus, apart from signal linesmen and message runners, Bray itself was too dangerous and was generally avoided by the Australians until their next thrust east, which drove the Germans out of neighbouring Suzanne. Within 17 days the Imperial Germany Army took the decision to disband the once stout German 43. R.I.D., due to its unsustainable losses - a pattern that was repeating across the German Army with more and more frequency, precipitating the conclusion of this terrible war with the signing of the Armistice with Germany on 11 November.

There are numerous Great War cemeteries in the vicinity of Bray, owing in particular to its proximity to the major battlefields of the Somme in 1916. Bray-sur-Somme German Cemetery is, however, the only one of these that is located in Bray itself, at the western edge of town on the corner of Rue Général de Gaulle & Rue des Fossés. This cemetery is the final resting place for 1,119 German soldiers who died in the various battles fought in the immediate area between 1914 and 1918.

For its four years of service during The Great War the town of Bray-sur-Somme was awarded the Croix de Guerre by Minister André Lefèvre on 27 October 1920. Reconstruction from the extensive damage to the town took place over many years.

=== Second World War ===
Bray was occupied by the Germans throughout the years of 1940–1944. On 1 September 1944, Bray-sur-Somme was liberated by Combat Command A of the US 2d Armored Division United States Army.

== Places of interest ==
=== The Museum ===
Exhibition of memories of the ‘Great War’, including cannons. Manfred von Richthofen, the Red Baron and his squadron, the ‘Flying Circus’ are commemorated in a display.

=== Saint-Nicolas church ===
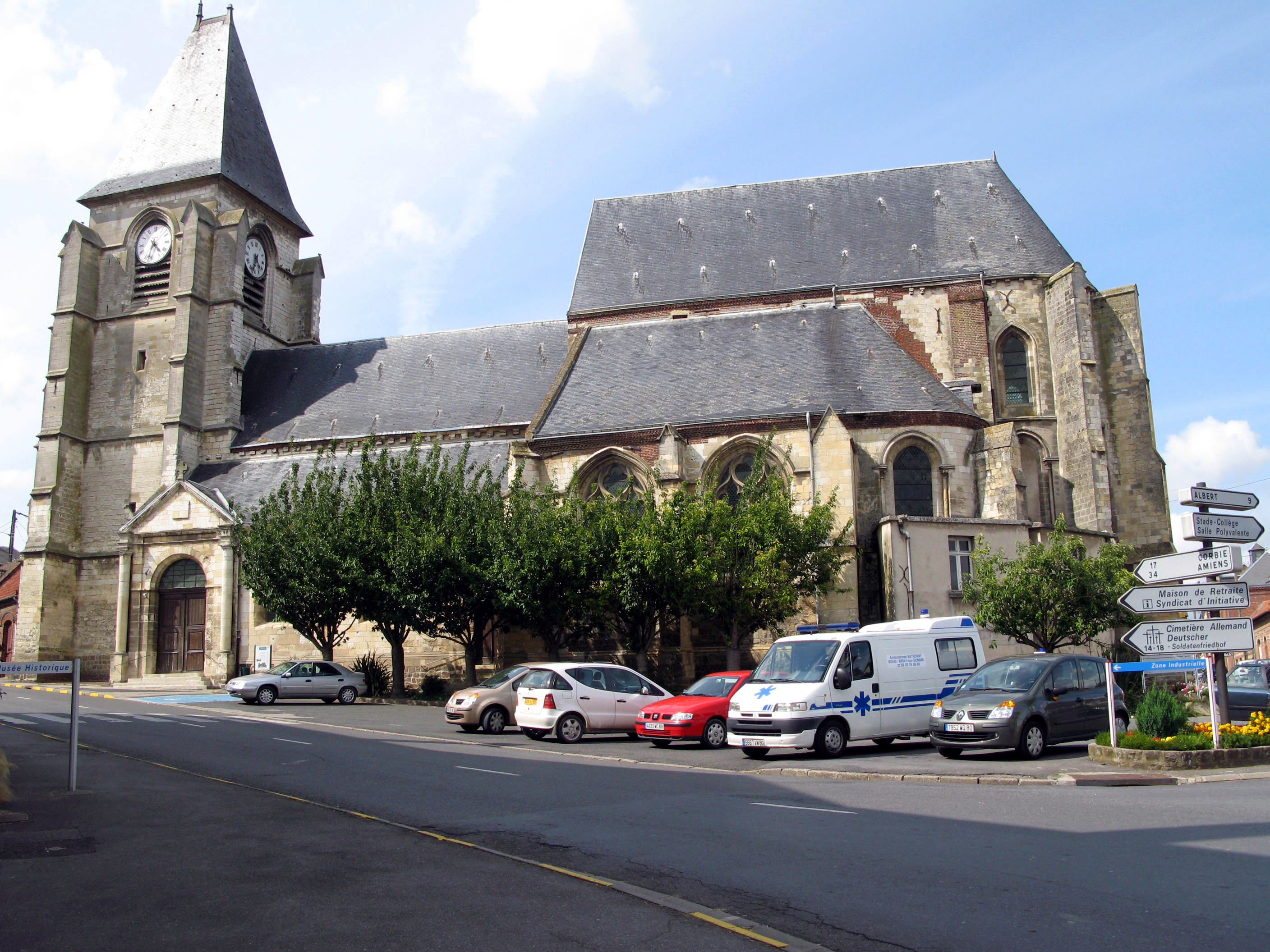
The church

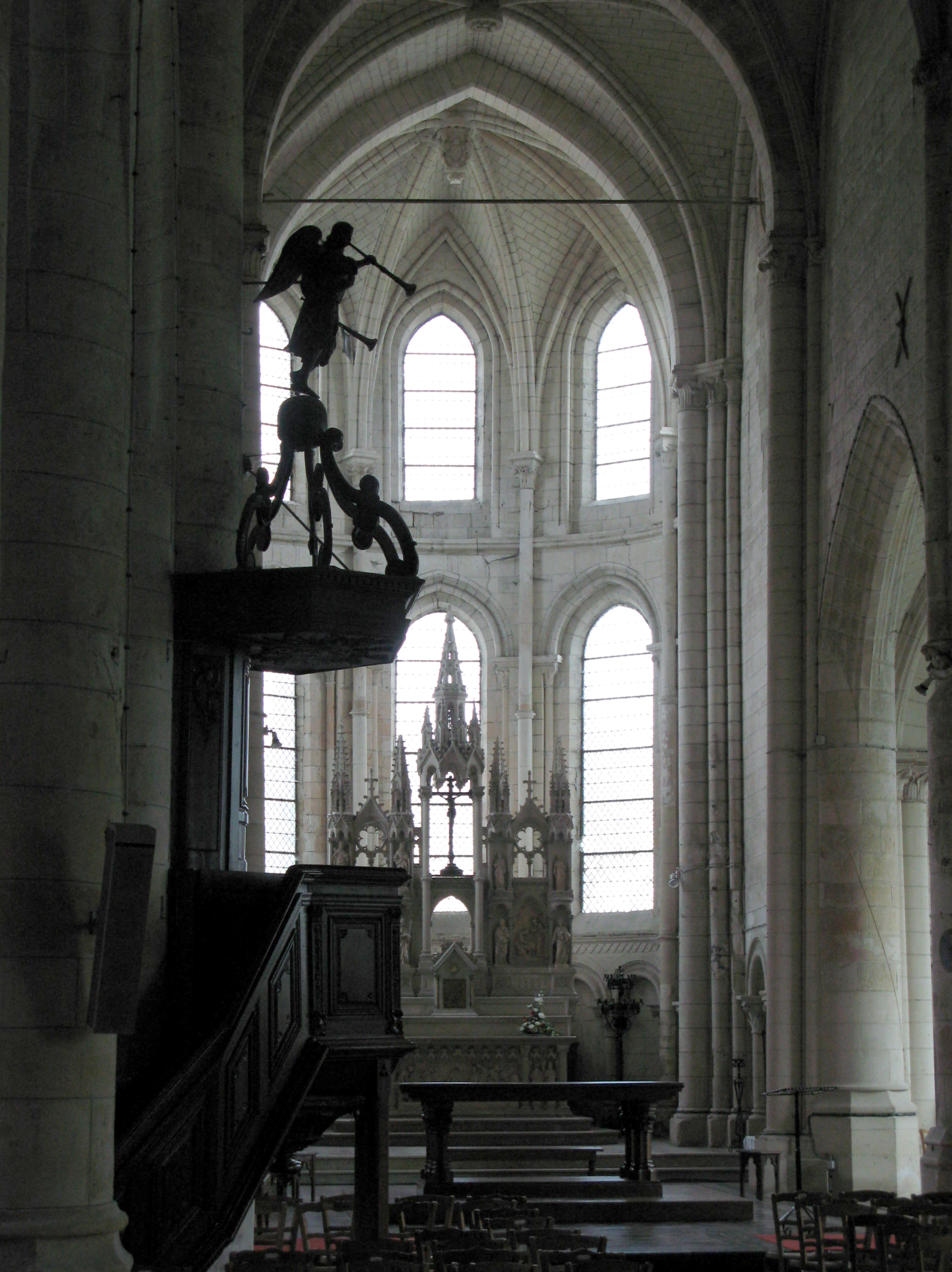
The altar

The church was built over the ruins of a monastery, from local limestone. The 35m bell-tower was added in 1745.

=== Public wash houses ===
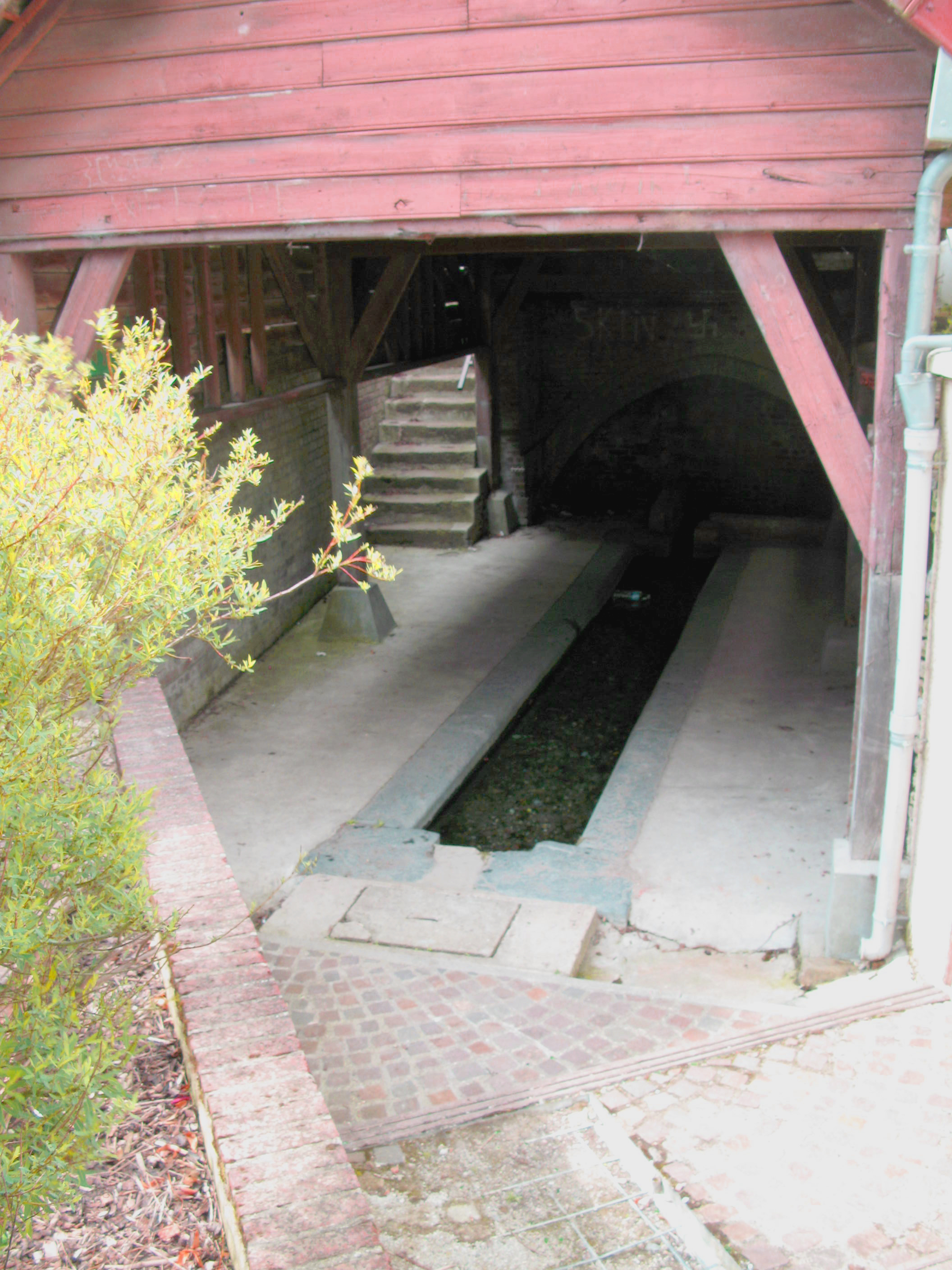
12 steps lead to the ‘lavoir’

Bray has two 18th-century wash houses, still accessible to the public.

=== Lakes ===
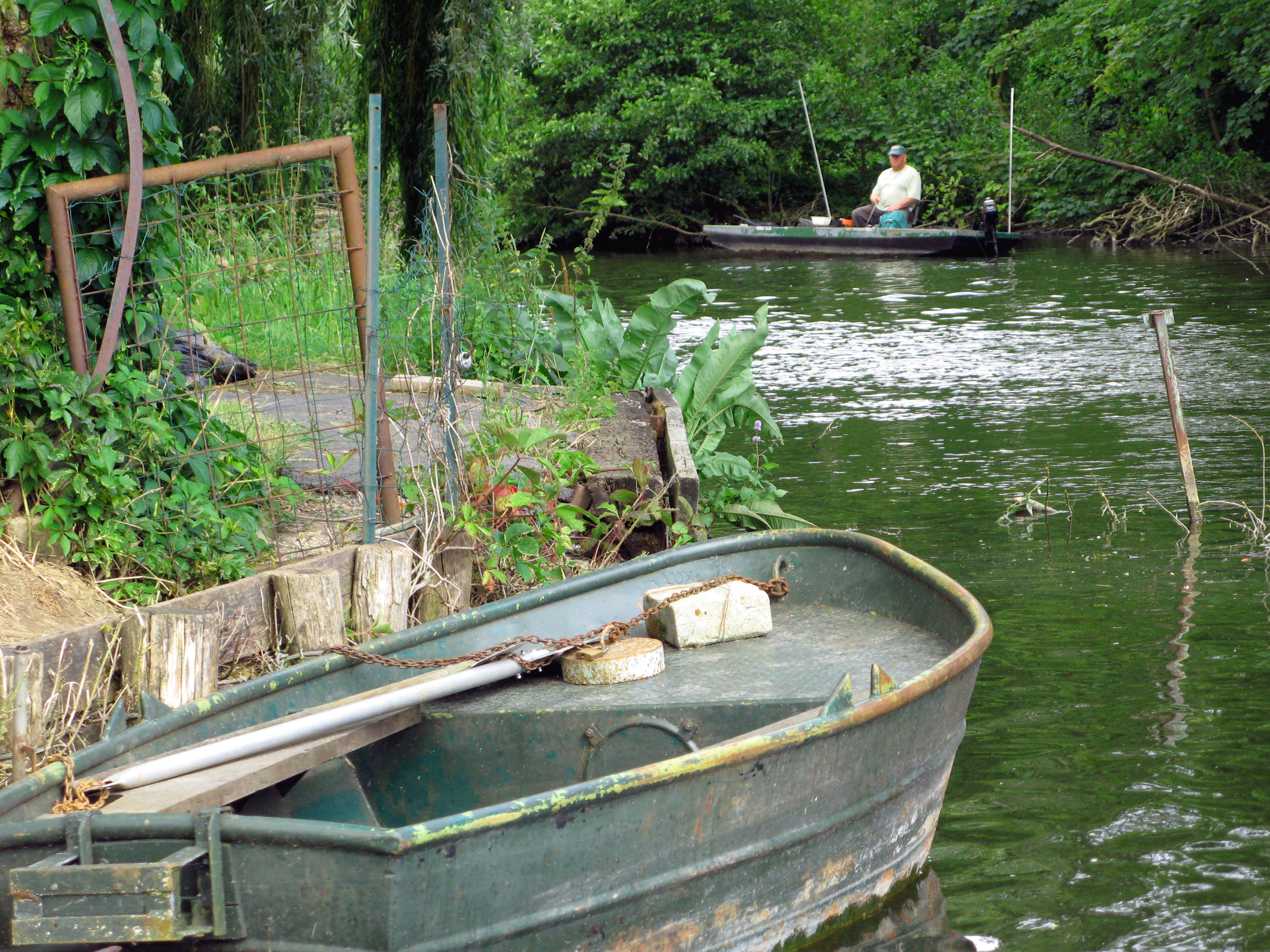

The region abounds with lakes and is a paradise for anglers. Pike, sander, bream, carp, roach and eels are among the different species found in the waters.

=== Peat ===
Peat is still cut, dried and used in the region.

=== Cemeteries ===
- Bray Military Cemetery

== See also ==
- Communes of the Somme department
