= East Ruston Old Vicarage =

Garden in Norfolk, England

Coordinates: 52.8057°N 1.5085°E

East Ruston Old Vicarage Gardens is a notable privately owned garden in the county of Norfolk at East Ruston in Eastern England.

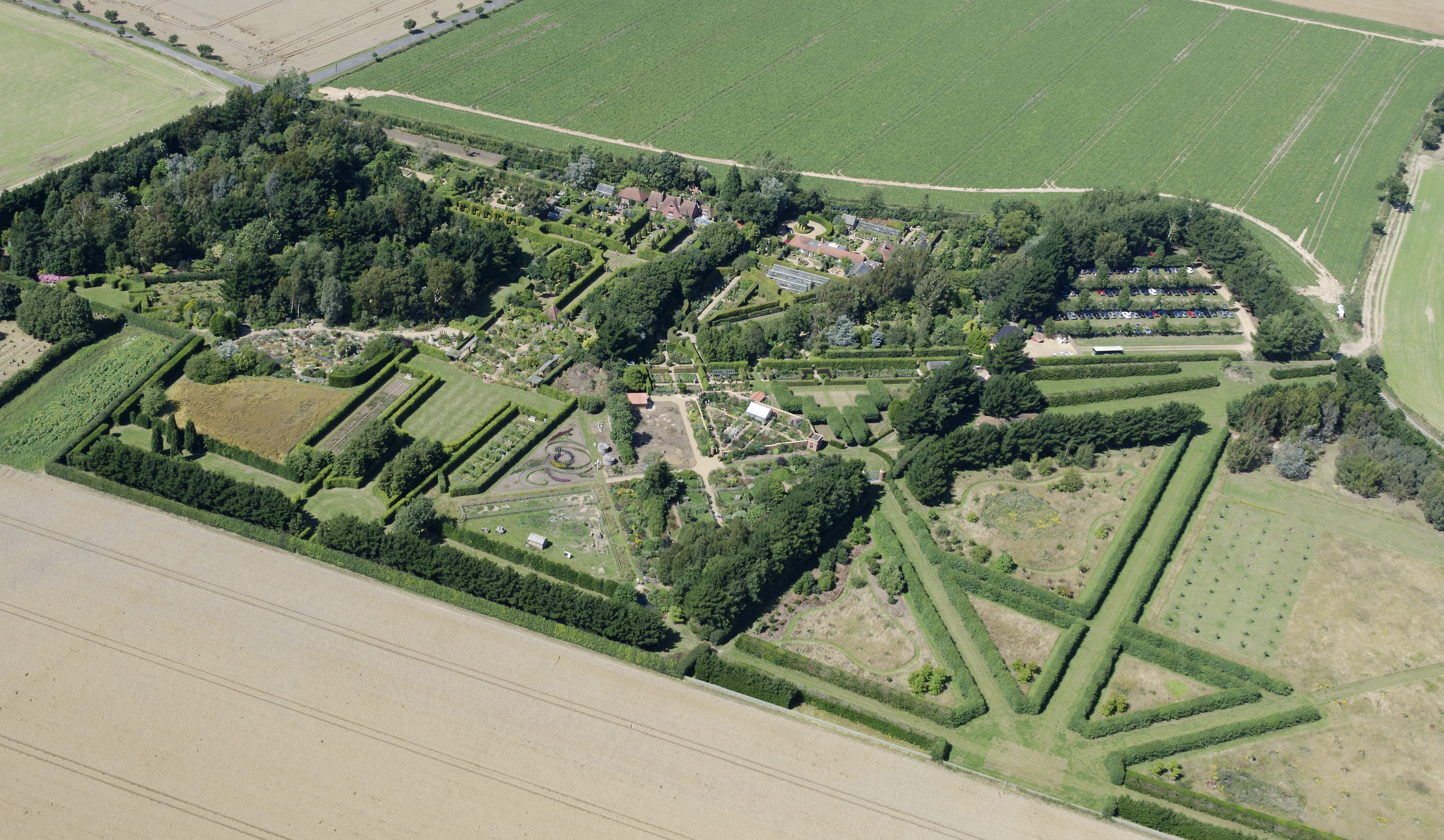
Aerial view

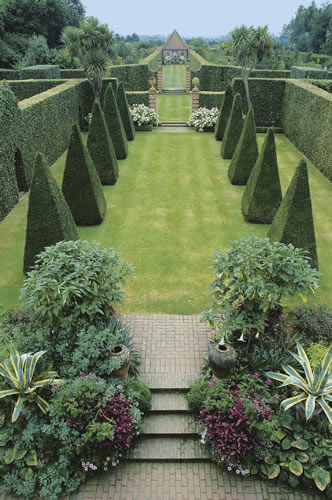

The gardens were established in 1973 by Alan Gray and Graham Robeson, who have created a 32-acre (130,000 m^{2}) design which incorporates exuberant and innovative planting alongside a more traditional formal design. On an unpromising site, close to the North Sea and surrounded by arable prairie, the gardens are protected from harsh onshore wind by a shelter belt of Monterey pines which created a unique micro-climate. Exotic and unusual plants from around the world flourish alongside more hardy species. Notable are the tree ferns, succulents and palms which surround the house, as is the Californian 'Desert Wash', the Exotic Garden with a water sculpture and a large cornfield sown with a selection of native but now scarce 'weeds' such as cornflower, poppy and corn marigold. The gardens contain an interesting collection of sculptures by local artists as well as many architectural features.
