= Great Ellingham Windmill =

Windmill in Great Ellingham, United Kingdom

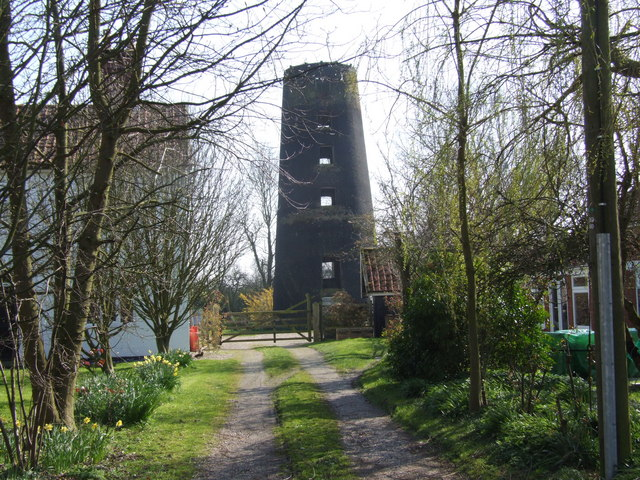
- Great Ellingham Windmill in 2007
- Interactive map of Great Ellingham Windmill

Origin
- Mill name: Great Ellingham Windmill
- Mill location: TM 0183 9688
- Coordinates: 52°31′56.71″N 0°58′27.42″E
- Operator: Private
- Year built: 1849

Information
- Purpose: Corn mill
- Type: Tower mill
- Storeys: Six storeys
- No. of sails: Four sails
- Type of sails: Double patent sails
- Windshaft: Cast iron
- Winding: Fantail
- Fantail blades: Six blades
- Auxiliary power: Oil engine

Great Ellingham Windmill is a Grade II listed tower mill in Great Ellingham, Norfolk, England which has been converted to residential accommodation.

== History ==
Great Ellingham Mill was described as "newly erected" when advertised for sale by auction on 2 April 1849 at the Crown Inn, Great Ellingham. It was not sold and advertised for sale or to let in July 1849. The mill then had common sails and drove a single pair of millstones. It was then five storeys tall. The mill was sold in 1854 to Samuel Le Grice. The mill was raised by a storey at an unknown date, and fitted with patent sails. The mill was advertised to let in February 1869. The mill house and bakery burnt down c. 1900. Samuel Le Grice died on 26 September 1906 and the mill passed to his brother Charles Le Grice. He sold the mill to his son Samuel Le Grice on 11 October 1906. The mill was sold to Josiah Carter on 26 October 1906. The mill was working by wind in 1916 and by an oil engine in 1922, but had closed down by 1926.

Josiah Carter died on 17 June 1927. The mill was sold to Eric Chilvers on 4 April 1930. The sails had been removed by 1932. The mill was sold to Felix Bowman on 24 November 1941. In 1946 it was leased to Cyril Scase, a baker from Chevington, Suffolk. Scase bought the mill on 23 June 1950. The mill was used as part of a bakery until the 1970s. On 9 June 1977, the mill was sold to a Mr Allen, who conveyed it on 25 July 1979 to Robert Hall. The mill was listed on 16 November 1983. It was sold to Michael May in 1984. In 2006, Breckland District Council granted planning permission to convert the mill to residential use, with an extension at ground floor level. The mill was placed on Norfolk County Council's Buildings at Risk Register in 2007 A revised scheme was submitted to the council in 2008.

== Description ==
Great Ellingham Mill is a six-storey tower mill. It formerly had a boat-shaped cap with a gallery and was winded by a six bladed fantail. There were four double patent sails. The mill retains some machinery, including the upright shaft.

== Millers ==
- James Buck 1849-50
- Jeremiah Fielding 1850-54
- William Stackwood 1861
- Robert Walker 1864
- George Butler 1865-96
  - William Stackwood 1866
  - Lewis Storey 1904-06
  - George Albert Hales 1906
- Josiah Carter 1908-16
- George Albert Hales 1922

Reference for above:-
