= Brumstead =

Village in Norfolk, England

Coordinates: 52.791°N 1.522°E

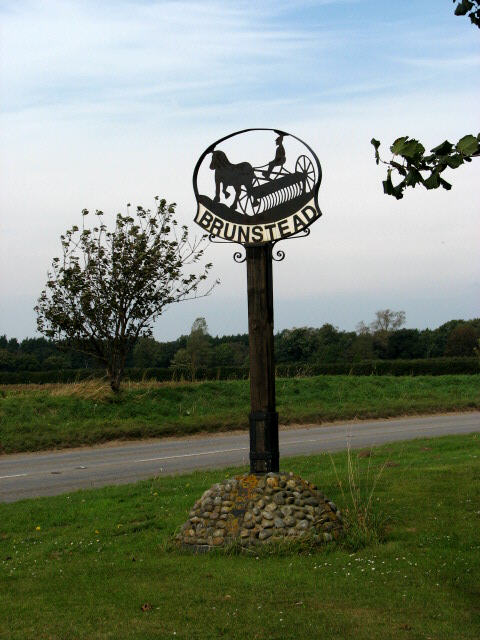
- Brumstead village sign

- Location within Norfolk
- Area: 3.22 km^{2} (1.24 sq mi)
- Population: 84 (parish, 2001 census)
  - Density: 26/km^{2} (67/sq mi)
- OS grid reference: TG374273
  - London: 134 miles (216 km)
- Civil parish: Brumstead
- District: North Norfolk
- Shire county: Norfolk
- Region: East
- Country: England
- Sovereign state: United Kingdom
- Post town: NORWICH
- Postcode district: NR12
- Dialling code: 01692
- Police: Norfolk
- Fire: Norfolk
- Ambulance: East of England

Brumstead (or Brunstead) is a village and a civil parish in the English county of Norfolk. It is about 1 mile (1.6 km) north of the town of Stalham, 15 miles (24 km) north-east of Norwich, and 18 miles (29 km).

== History ==
Brumstead's name is of Anglo-Saxon origin and in the Domesday Book is recorded as a settlement of 21 households belonging to Roger Bigod. The survey mentions the village also held 30 goats, a church and a mill alongside pannage or woodland for 16 pigs.

The village has also been known for hundreds of years as Brunstead and is named this way on old maps demonstrate. The village sign uses this name.

== Geography ==
At the 2001 census the parish had a population of 84. At the 2011 census the population remained less than 100 and was included in the civil parish of East Ruston.

For the purposes of local government, the parish falls within the district of North Norfolk. The village is situated on the route of the B1159 that runs between the town of Cromer and the town of Stalham. The nearest railway station is at North Walsham for the Bittern Line which runs between Cromer and Norwich. The nearest airport is Norwich International Airport.

== St. Peter's Church ==
Brumstead's Parish Church is dedicated to Saint Peter and is of Norman origin.
