= Bray Military Cemetery =

WWI CWGC cemetery in Somme, France

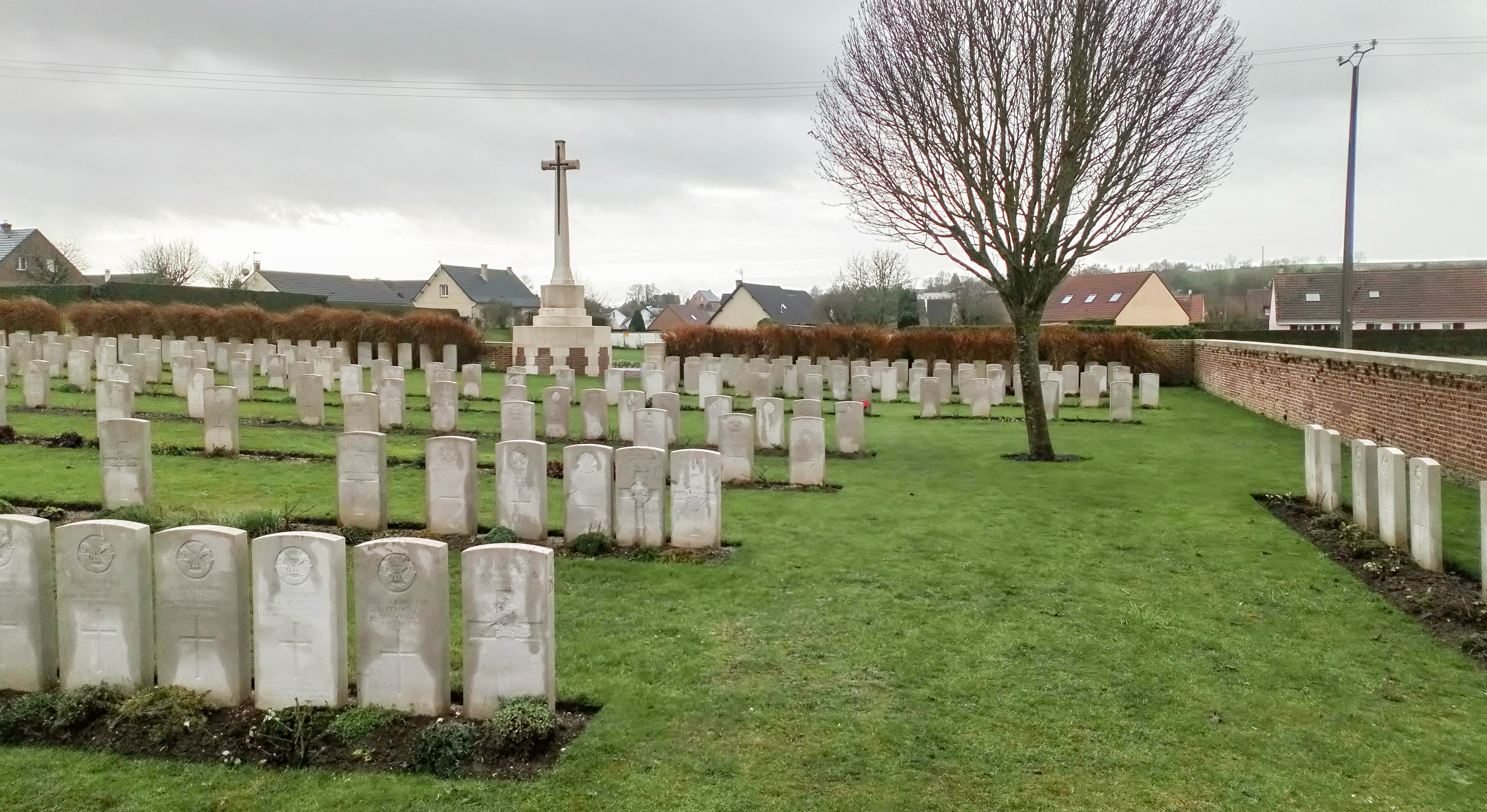

Details
- Established: April 1916
- Location: Bray-sur-Somme, Somme, France
- Country: United Kingdom (UK)
- Coordinates: 49.9472°N 2.7195°E
- Type: Military
- Owned by: Commonwealth War Graves Commission (CWGC)
- No. of graves: 874 total, 750 identified
- Website: cwgc.org
- Find a Grave: Bray Military Cemetery

The Bray Military Cemetery (French: Cimetière britannique de Bray-sur-Somme) is a military cemetery located in the Somme region of France commemorating British and Commonwealth soldiers who fought in the Battle of the Somme in World War I. The cemetery contains mainly those who died from April to March 1916 and in August 1918 near the village of Bray-sur-Somme and over the course of the war in the surrounding area.

== Location ==
The cemetery is located in the north of Bray-sur-Somme, which is approximately 9 kilometers southeast of Albert, France on the D239 road.

== Establishment of the cemetery ==
The cemetery was begun in April 1916 and was used by the British XIV Corps Main Dressing Station in September 1916. In 1917, the cemetery was used by the 5th, 38th and 48th Casualty Clearing Stations. The cemetery was briefly used by the 40th Australian Battalion in August 1918 in their drive through Bray-sur-Somme. After the end of the war, in 1918 and 1924, more graves were brought in from areas north and south of the village.

The cemetery is rectangular and enclosed by a brick wall covered by white capstones. It was designed by Sir Reginald Blomfield and Arthur James Scott Hutton.

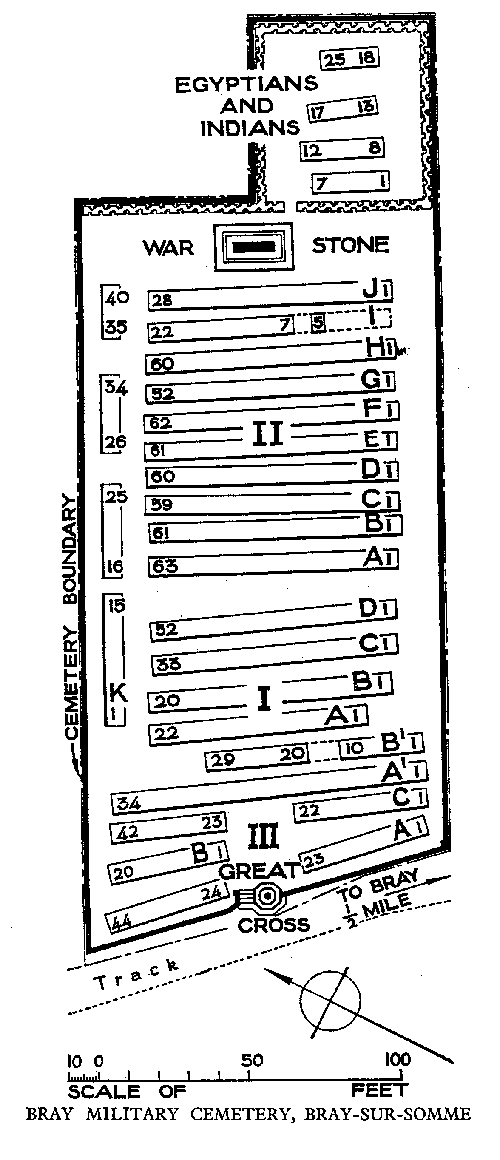
Bray Military Cemetery Plan

=== Statistics ===
The cemetery contains 874 burials, of which 750 are identified and 124 are unidentified.

Identified Burials by Nationality
Nationality	Number of Burials
United Kingdom	705
Australia	29
India	12
Canada	3
South Africa	1
Egypt	Unknown
Total	750
