= Combles Communal Cemetery Extension =

WWI CWGC cemetery in Somme, France

Combles Communal Commonwealth War Graves Commission Cemetery Extension
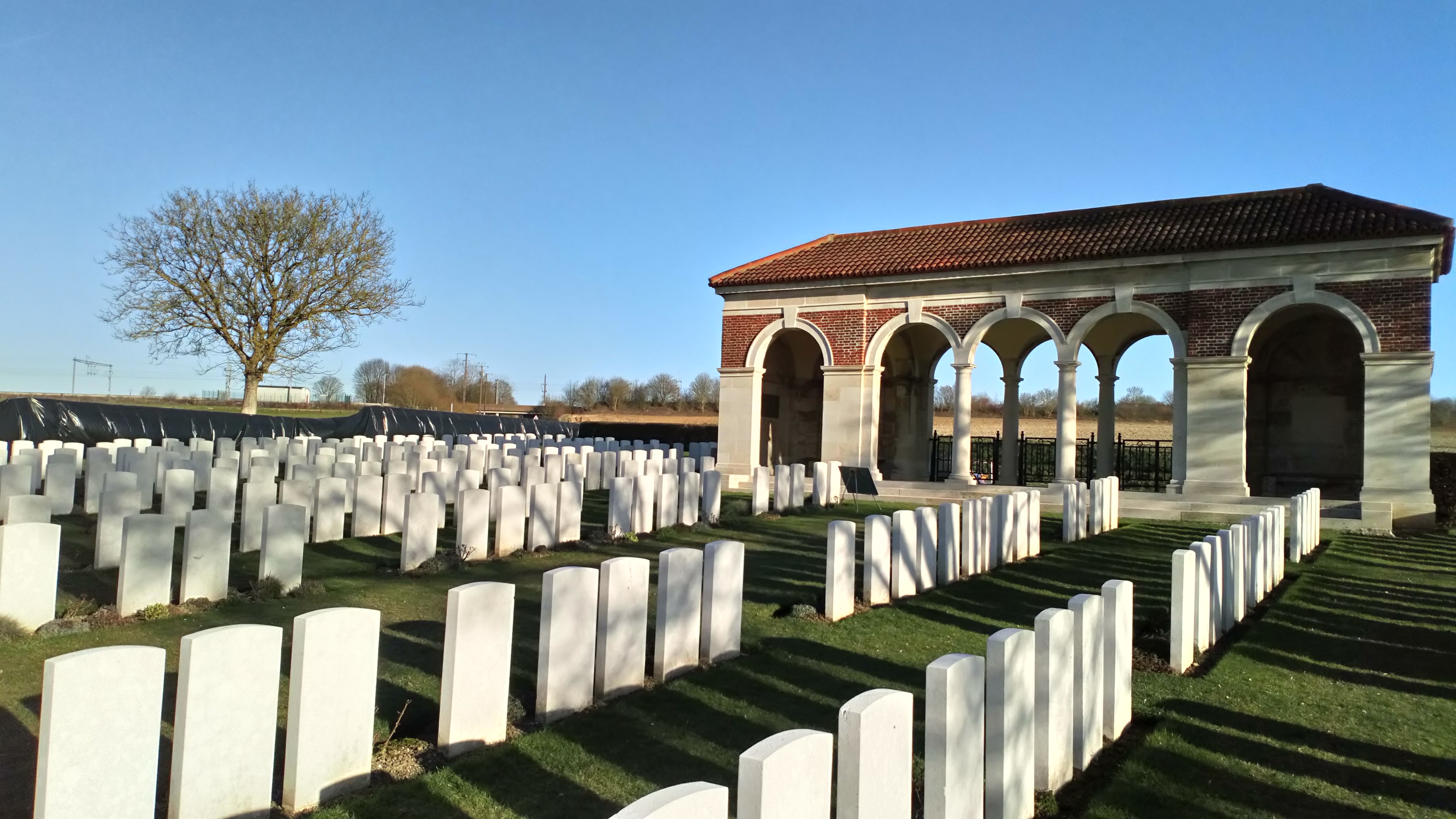
- Interactive map of Combles Communal Commonwealth War Graves Commission Cemetery Extension

Details
- Established: October 1916
- Location: Combles, Somme, France
- Country: British and Commonwealth
- Coordinates: 50°00′39″N 2°52′18″E
- Type: Military
- Owned by: Commonwealth War Graves Commission
- Size: 5356 sq m
- No. of graves: 1508 total, 535 identified
- Website: cwgc.org
- Find a Grave: Combles Communal Commonwealth War Graves Commission Cemetery Extension

The Combles Communal Commonwealth War Graves Commission Cemetery Extension (also known as the Combles Communal Cemetery Extension) is a military cemetery located in the Somme region of France commemorating British and Commonwealth soldiers who fought in the Battle of the Somme in World War I. The cemetery contains mainly those who died near the village of Combles between October 1916 and March 1917 and between May and September 1918. It was designed by Sir Herbert Baker.

== Location ==
The cemetery is located near the A1 and D172 roads, in the village of Combles. It is located approximately 13 kilometers south of Bapaume and 16 kilometers east of Albert, France.

== Fighting near Combles ==
The area around Combles was held by the Germans until it was taken by the French Army and British 56th (London) Division on 26 August 1916. The Germans took the area back on 24 March 1918 despite resistance put up by the South African Brigade at Marrieres Wood. Combles was retaken by the British 18th (Eastern) Division on 29 August 1918.

== Establishment of the Cemetery ==
The cemetery was begun by the French in October 1916 and was used by the British from December 1916 to March 1917. Between June and August 1918, German soldiers were buried in Plot I. 18th Division made more burials in the cemetery in August and September 1918. After the end of the war, more graves were brought in from the surrounding area and from smaller cemeteries.

=== Former burial sites moved to Combles ===
Former burial sites of soldiers now buried in Combles include:

- Fregicourt Communal Cemetery was located in the hamlet of Fregicourt, between Combles and Saillisel. It contains four British soldiers who were buried in the winter of 1916–17.
- Leuze Wood Cemetery, Combles, was located in the northeast corner of Leuze Wood. It contained the graves of eleven British soldiers and five French who fell between September 1916 and January, 1917.
- Longtree Dump Military Cemetery, Sailly-Saillisel was located a distance south of the road from Morval to Sailly-Saillisel. 20 French soldiers and 12 British were buried here in December 1916 and February 1917.
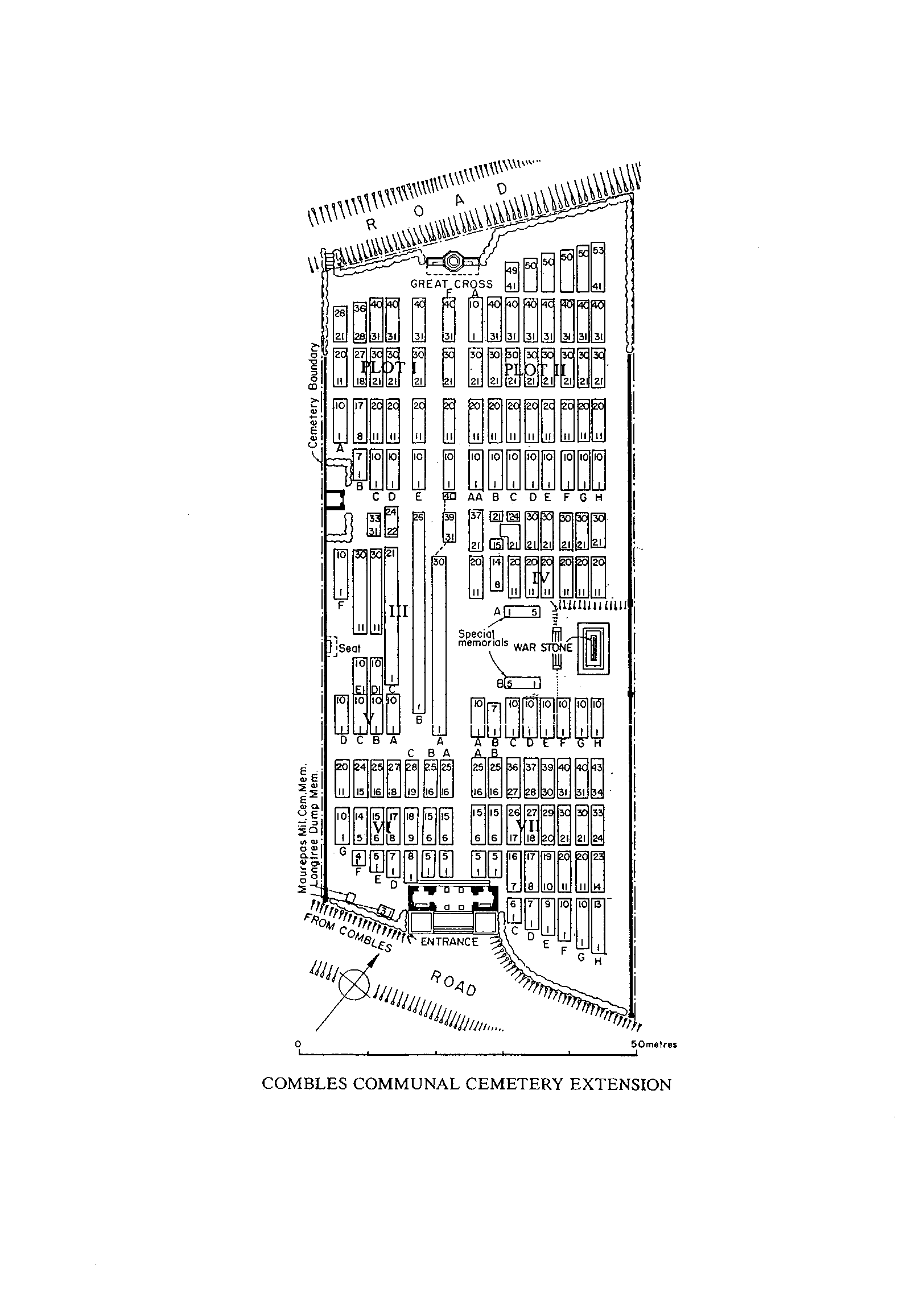
- Combles Communal Cemetery Extension Plan
  Maurepas Military Cemetery was located in the southwest side of Maurepas village. 12 French soldiers, 9 British, and 1 German prisoner were buried here between December 1916 and February 1917. Maurepas was taken by the French I Corps in August 1916.

=== Statistics ===
There 1508 casualties buried in the cemetery, of which 535 are identified. 96 French graves and 194 German soldiers buried in the cemetery have since been moved to separate burial sites. Plots II, V, VI, and VII were added after the end of the war, and Plot IV was greatly expanded by an influx of 944 burials from the surrounding area and cemeteries listed above. Special memorials are dedicated to 9 British and 1 South African believed to be buried among the unknown, and to 3 British soldiers from Longtree Dump and Maurepas whose graves were destroyed by shellfire. The cemetery covers an area of 5356 square meters.

Burials by Nationality
Nationality	Number of Burials
United Kingdom	1462
Australia	22
South Africa	11
Canada	7
