= Happisburgh Cliffs =

UK Site of Special Scientific Interest

Coordinates: 52.826°N 1.533°E

- Site of Special Scientific Interest
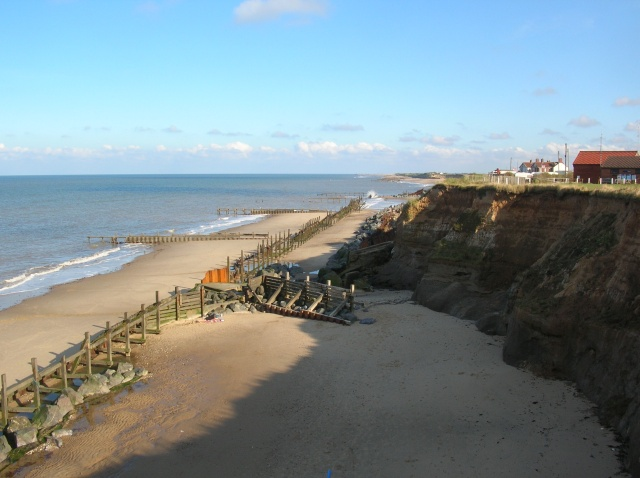
- Location of Happisburgh Cliffs.
- Area of search: Norfolk, England
- Grid reference: TG 381 312
- Interest: Geological
- Area: 6.1 hectares (15 acres)
- Notification date: 1985
- Location map: Magic Map

Happisburgh Cliffs is a 6.1-hectare (15-acre) geological Site of Special Scientific Interest west of North Walsham in Norfolk, England. It is a Geological Conservation Review site.

These cliffs are unique as they display three glacial deposits, from the 1.9 million year old Pre-Pastonian Stage to the Beestonian and the Cromer Tills of the Anglian stage 450,000 years ago, the most severe ice age of the Pleistocene.

The cliffs are above a public beach.
