= Boulleville =

- Commune
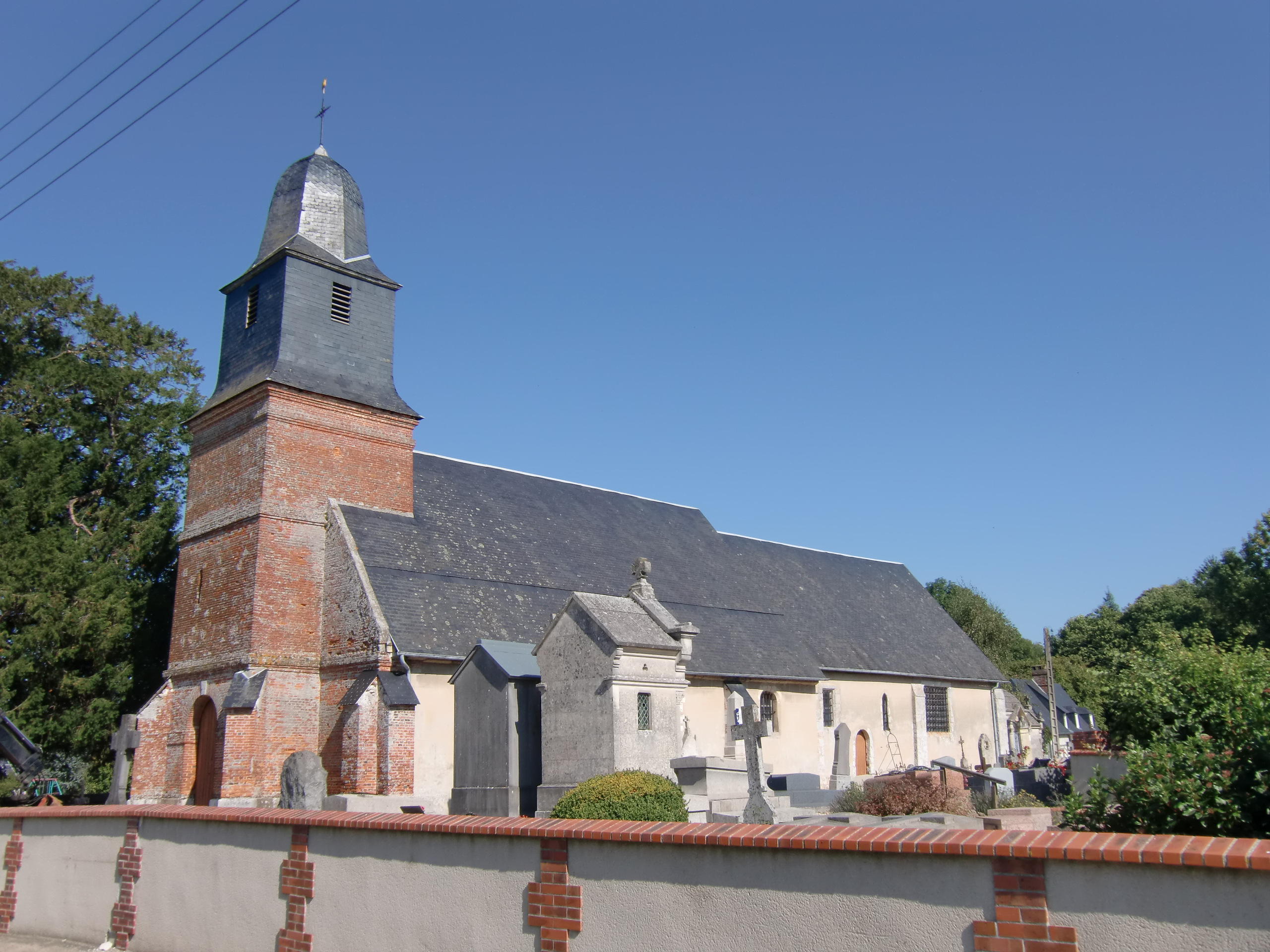
- The church in Boulleville
- Location of Boulleville
- Location within France Location within Normandy
- Coordinates: 49°22′08″N 0°23′36″E
- Country: France
- Region: Normandy
- Department: Eure
- Arrondissement: Bernay
- Canton: Beuzeville
- Intercommunality: Pays de Honfleur-Beuzeville

Government
  - Mayor (2025–2026): Sabrina Sanchez
- Area^{1}: 7.17 km^{2} (2.77 sq mi)
- Elevation: 122 m (400 ft)
- Highest elevation: 129 m (423 ft)
- Lowest elevation: 39 m (128 ft)
- Population (2023): 1,236
  - Density: 172/km^{2} (446/sq mi)
- Time zone: UTC+01:00 (CET)
  - Summer (DST): UTC+02:00 (CEST)
- INSEE/Postal code: 27100 /27210
- ^{1} French Land Register data, which excludes lakes, ponds, glaciers > 1 km^{2} (0.386 sq mi or 247 acres) and river estuaries.

Boulleville (French pronunciation: [bulvil]) is a commune in the Eure department in Normandy in northern France.

== Population ==
Historical population
Year	Pop.	±% p.a.
1968	343	—
1975	451	+3.99%
1982	458	+0.22%
1990	533	+1.91%
1999	793	+4.51%
2007	892	+1.48%
2012	1,017	+2.66%
2017	1,148	+2.45%
2023	1,236	+1.24%
Source: INSEE

== See also ==
- Communes of the Eure department
