= Whimpwell =

Former settlement in NE Norfolk, England

- Lost settlement
- Country: England
- County: Norfolk
- Hundred: Happing
- Recorded: Domesday Book (1086)
- Lost to the sea: By the later Middle Ages

Whimpwell (also Wimpwell) was a small settlement in the hundred of Happing, Norfolk, east of present-day Happisburgh. It was recorded in the Domesday Book as having 9 households. The settlement was lost to North Sea coastal erosion, with only one field remaining by 1183. The name survives as Whimpwell Street and the hamlet of Whimpwell Green.

== Domesday Book ==
The first recorded mention of Whimpwell is found in the Domesday Book, where it is described as a settlement of only nine households in Happing hundred, making it one of the smaller settlements described in the survey. There were two holdings, both in the fee of St Benet's Abbey.

== Archaeological remains ==
In 1987, divers found an L-shaped stone structure two miles off Happisburgh and fifty feet down. The structure measured 75 metres by 200 metres and up to 12 metres high in places, which has been proposed as a possible quay for the settlement of Whimpwell.

== Legacy ==
'Whimpwell' appears in local place names - Whimpwell Street, which is in the centre of Happisburgh, and the hamlet Whimpwell Green, part of the parish of Happisburgh, about 1 mile south of the village centre.

== Other lost villages ==
Other villages lost to the sea in the area include the majority of nearby Eccles on Sea and Shipden , east of Cromer.
