= Carnoy Military Commonwealth War Graves Commission Cemetery =

Cemetery located in Somme, in France

Coordinates: 49°58′56″N 2°45′16″E

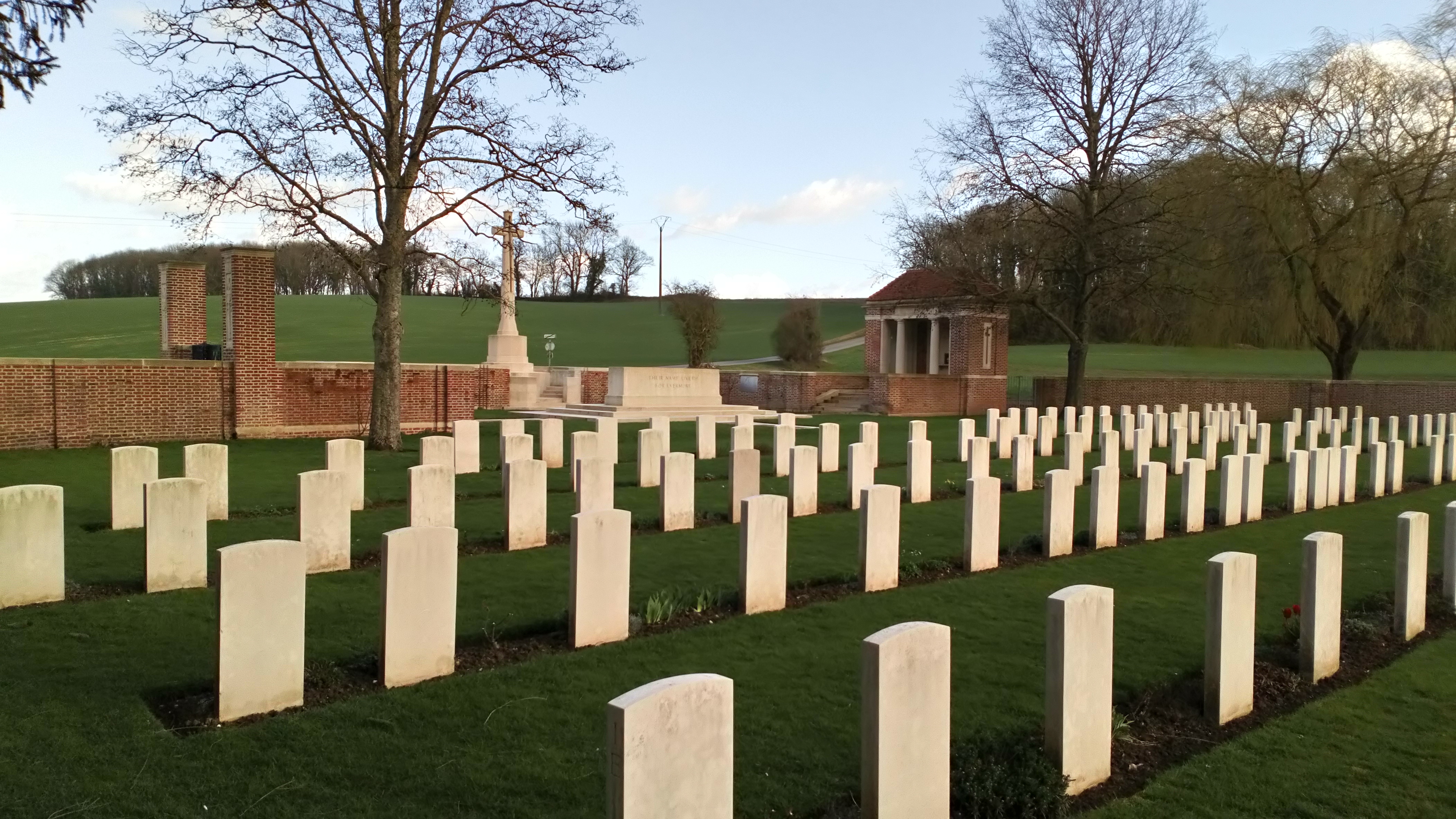
Carnoy Military Commonwealth War Graves Commission Cemetery

The Carnoy Military Commonwealth War Graves Commission Cemetery is a war cemetery located on the Somme battlefield in France. The cemetery contains the remains of 826 casualties from the First World War. Its name is derived from the nearby town of Carnoy.

== Foundation ==
The cemetery was begun in August 1915 by the 2nd King's Own Yorkshire Light Infantry. It was temporarily closed in 1917 and its land was converted to an advanced base for ambulances and field hospitals. From March to August 1918 it was occupied by German forces following the German spring offensive. Some of the German war dead were buried at Carnoy, though these bodies were removed in 1924. Today the cemetery covers 4440 square meters and serves as a final resting place for around 826 bodies.
