= Grade I listed buildings in North Norfolk =

There are over 9,000 Grade I listed buildings in England. This page is a list of these buildings in the district of North Norfolk in Norfolk.

== North Norfolk ==
Name	Location	Type	Completed (Note: The date given is the date used by Historic England as significant for the initial building or that of an important part in the structure's description.)	Date designated	Grid ref. (Note: The grid reference is based on the British national grid reference system, sometimes known as OSGB36, used by the Ordnance Survey.) Geo-coordinates	Entry number (Note: The "List Entry Number" is a unique number assigned to each listed building and scheduled monument by Historic England.)	Image
Church of All Saints	Thurgarton, Aldborough, North Norfolk	Parish Church (redundant)	Medieval	4 October 1960	TG1811535895; 52°52′35″N 1°14′23″E	1373472	Church of All Saints More images
Church of St Mary	Antingham	Parish Church	Medieval	4 October 1960	TG2525732840; 52°50′45″N 1°20′37″E	1373433	Church of St Mary More images
Church of St Lawrence	Ashmanhaugh	Parish Church	Mid 11th century	16 April 1955	TG3279721962; 52°44′42″N 1°26′51″E	1049929	Church of St Lawrence More images
Remains of Baconsthorpe Castle	Baconsthorpe	Castle	After Civil War	30 September 1987	TG1209638168; 52°53′57″N 1°09′07″E	1049845	Remains of Baconsthorpe Castle More images
Church of All Saints	Edingthorpe, Bacton	Parish Church	12th century	16 April 1955	TG3233033151; 52°50′45″N 1°26′55″E	1373426	Church of All Saints More images
Ruins of Bromholm Priory	Bacton	Chapter House	12th century	16 April 1955	TG3475433247; 52°50′44″N 1°29′05″E	1373815	Ruins of Bromholm Priory More images
Church of St Giles	Houghton St Giles, Barsham	Parish Church	14th century	6 March 1959	TF9237235362; 52°52′53″N 0°51′27″E	1049418	Church of St Giles More images
East Barsham Manor	East Barsham, Barsham	Manor House	1520-1530	30 November 1951	TF9170733915; 52°52′07″N 0°50′48″E	1049454	East Barsham Manor More images
The Gatehouse to East Barsham Manor	East Barsham, Barsham	Gatehouse	post 1527	16 January 1984	TF9172733888; 52°52′06″N 0°50′49″E	1373706	The Gatehouse to East Barsham Manor
The Slipper Chapel	Houghton St Giles, Barsham	Roman Catholic Chapel	Mid 14th century	6 March 1959	TF9208335316; 52°52′52″N 0°51′11″E	1170439	The Slipper Chapel More images
Church of St Michael	Barton Turf	Parish Church	14th century	16 April 1955	TG3433921865; 52°44′37″N 1°28′13″E	1049931	Church of St Michael More images
Church of All Saints	Beeston Regis	Parish Church	Medieval	4 October 1960	TG1743643074; 52°56′28″N 1°14′04″E	1049521	Church of All Saints More images
Priory of St Mary in the Meadow	Beeston Regis	Church	1216-1539	4 October 1960	TG1675642801; 52°56′20″N 1°13′27″E	1373641	Priory of St Mary in the Meadow More images
Church of All Saints	Cockthorpe, Binham	Parish Church	c. 1300	6 March 1959	TF9814142220; 52°56′27″N 0°56′50″E	1373671	Church of All Saints More images
Church of St Mary (Binham Priory)	Binham	Church	12th century	6 March 1959	TF9817939942; 52°55′13″N 0°56′47″E	1170780	Church of St Mary (Binham Priory) More images
Gatehouse at Binham Priory	Binham	Benedictine Monastery	15th century	30 November 1951	TF9807639938; 52°55′13″N 0°56′42″E	1049509	Gatehouse at Binham Priory More images
Church of St Nicholas	Blakeney	Parish Church	13th century	6 March 1959	TG0330943598; 52°57′04″N 1°01′30″E	1039495	Church of St Nicholas More images
Church of St Maurice	Briningham	Parish Church	c. 1300	6 March 1959	TG0388034394; 52°52′06″N 1°01′39″E	1049422	Church of St Maurice More images
Church of All Saints	Sharrington, Brinton	Parish Church	c. 1300	6 March 1959	TG0304336650; 52°53′20″N 1°01′00″E	1305969	Church of All Saints More images
Church of St Andrew	Brinton	Parish Church	15th century	6 March 1959	TG0381035722; 52°52′49″N 1°01′39″E	1049393	Church of St Andrew More images
Church of All Saints	Catfield	Parish Church	14th century	16 April 1955	TG3817821245; 52°44′11″N 1°31′36″E	1373413	Church of All Saints More images
Church of St Margaret	Newgate, Cley Next the Sea	Parish Church	14th century	4 October 1960	TG0485043130; 52°56′47″N 1°02′51″E	1172407	Church of St Margaret More images
Church of St Botolph	Banningham, Colby	Parish Church	Medieval	4 October 1960	TG2156829440; 52°49′01″N 1°17′12″E	1172141	Church of St Botolph More images
Church of St Andrew	Saxthorpe, Corpusty and Saxthorpe	Parish Church	12th century	4 October 1960	TG1161730422; 52°49′47″N 1°08′23″E	1373804	Church of St Andrew More images
Parish Church of St Peter and St Paul	Cromer	Parish Church	15th century	28 November 1950	TG2197142201; 52°55′53″N 1°18′05″E	1049032	Parish Church of St Peter and St Paul More images
Church of All Saints	Toftrees, Dunton	Parish Church	14th century	6 March 1959	TF8979227570; 52°48′44″N 0°48′53″E	1049295	Church of All Saints More images
Church of St Mary	Erpingham	Parish Church	Medieval	4 October 1960	TG1987131251; 52°50′02″N 1°15′46″E	1172181	Church of St Mary More images
Church of St Peter and St Paul	Fakenham	Church	14th century	6 March 1959	TF9192629704; 52°49′50″N 0°50′51″E	1039454	Church of St Peter and St Paul More images
Felbrigg Hall	Felbrigg Park, Felbrigg	House	Circa 1621-24	20 February 1952	TG1927939414; 52°54′27″N 1°15′34″E	1373644	Felbrigg Hall More images
Church of St. Andrew	Field Dalling	Parish Church	Medieval	6 March 1959	TG0062439015; 52°54′40″N 0°58′56″E	1049788	Church of St. Andrew More images
Church of St Mary	Barney, Fulmodeston	Parish Church	Pre 1100	6 March 1959	TF9942432778; 52°51′20″N 0°57′38″E	1152872	Church of St Mary More images
Church of All Saints	Gimingham	Parish Church	Medieval	4 October 1960	TG2856536683; 52°52′44″N 1°23′43″E	1049804	Church of All Saints More images
Church of St Mary	Great Snoring	Parish Church	c. 1200	6 March 1959	TF9463234524; 52°52′23″N 0°53′26″E	1170846	Church of St Mary More images
Church of All Saints	Bale, Gunthorpe	Parish Church	c. 1300	6 March 1959	TG0109436758; 52°53′26″N 0°59′16″E	1305752	Church of All Saints More images
Church of St Andrew	Gunton, Hanworth	Church	1769	24 April 1987	TG2291134129; 52°51′30″N 1°18′35″E	1373457	Church of St Andrew More images
Hanworth Hall	Hanworth	Country House	c. 1700	20 February 1952	TG1933235491; 52°52′20″N 1°15′27″E	1049863	Hanworth Hall More images
Church of St Mary	Happisburgh	Parish Church	14th century	16 April 1955	TG3798031152; 52°49′31″N 1°31′51″E	1169843	Church of St Mary More images
Church of St Martin	Hindringham	Parish Church	14th century	6 March 1959	TF9842236410; 52°53′19″N 0°56′52″E	1049373	Church of St Martin More images
Holkham Hall	Holkham Park, Holkham	Country House	1734-1764	30 November 1951	TF8845642842; 52°56′59″N 0°48′13″E	1373659	Holkham Hall More images
The Leicester Monument	Holkham Park, Holkham	Column	1845-8	30 November 1951	TF8845043590; 52°57′24″N 0°48′14″E	1171158	The Leicester Monument More images
The Temple	Holkham Park, Holkham	Garden Temple	1729-31	30 November 1951	TF8819041965; 52°56′31″N 0°47′57″E	1049515	Upload Photo
The Triumphal Arch	Holkham Park, Holkham	Gatehouse	c. 1760	20 May 1983	TF8823239439; 52°55′10″N 0°47′54″E	1049476	The Triumphal Arch More images
Church of All Saints	Crostwight, Honing	Parish Church	Early 14th century	16 April 1955	TG3339729989; 52°49′01″N 1°27′44″E	1169968	Church of All Saints More images
Gatehouse to St Benets Abbey	Horning	Abbey	1020	16 April 1955	TG3802615785; 52°41′15″N 1°31′14″E	1171673	Gatehouse to St Benets Abbey More images
Hoveton House	Hoveton	House	c. 1680	16 April 1955	TG3196017573; 52°42′22″N 1°25′56″E	1049903	Upload Photo
Church of Holy Trinity	Ingham	Parish Church	1340-44	16 April 1955	TG3910026012; 52°46′43″N 1°32′38″E	1049353	Church of Holy Trinity More images
Mannington Hall	Mannington, Itteringham	Hall House	c. 1460	20 February 1952	TG1437432008; 52°50′34″N 1°10′54″E	1304622	Mannington Hall More images
Church of St Peter and St Paul	Knapton, North Norfolk	Parish Church	Early 14th century	16 April 1955	TG3075334177; 52°51′20″N 1°25′34″E	1306264	Church of St Peter and St Paul More images
Church of St Mary and St Andrew	Langham, North Norfolk	Parish Church	14th century	6 March 1959	TG0076341237; 52°55′52″N 0°59′08″E	1049495	Church of St Mary and St Andrew More images
Church of St Andrew	Little Snoring	Parish Church	Norman	24 January 1984	TF9530732561; 52°51′18″N 0°53′58″E	1373753	Church of St Andrew More images
Detached Tower, Church of St Andrew	Little Snoring	Round Towered Church	C11-C12	24 January 1984	TF9529632552; 52°51′18″N 0°53′57″E	1049264	Detached Tower, Church of St Andrew More images
Church of St Catherine, Ludham	Ludham	Parish Church	14th century	16 April 1955	TG3881118266; 52°42′34″N 1°32′02″E	1049913	Church of St Catherine, Ludham More images
Barningham Hall	Matlaske	Country House	1612	20 February 1952	TG1471735376; 52°52′23″N 1°11′20″E	1373792	Barningham Hall More images
Church of St Peter	Melton Constable Park, Melton Constable	Parish Church	Pre 1066	6 March 1959	TG0378431960; 52°50′48″N 1°01′29″E	1049221	Church of St Peter More images
Melton Constable Hall	Melton Constable Park, Melton Constable	House	c. 1500	30 November 1951	TG0307931925; 52°50′47″N 1°00′51″E	1153044	Melton Constable Hall More images
Church of All Saints	Morston	Parish Church	12th century	6 March 1959	TG0083843825; 52°57′15″N 0°59′18″E	1373691	Church of All Saints More images
Church of St Nicholas	North Walsham	Church	Pre Conquest	21 June 1950	TG2833330272; 52°49′18″N 1°23′15″E	1039527	Church of St Nicholas More images
Market Cross	North Walsham		Post 1549	21 June 1950	TG2824530242; 52°49′17″N 1°23′10″E	1281216	Market Cross More images
Church of St Mary	Northrepps	Parish Church	Medieval	4 October 1960	TG2445839065; 52°54′08″N 1°20′10″E	1049812	Church of St Mary More images
Church of St Margaret	Paston	Parish Church	14th century	16 April 1955	TG3228234435; 52°51′26″N 1°26′56″E	1373419	Church of St Margaret More images
Church of St Nicholas	Potter Heigham	Parish Church	12th century	16 April 1955	TG4194819930; 52°43′22″N 1°34′53″E	1049923	Church of St Nicholas More images
Raynham Hall, North East Service Wing and Wall	East Raynham, Raynham	Country House	1619	30 November 1951	TF8821125755; 52°47′47″N 0°47′25″E	1049270	Raynham Hall, North East Service Wing and Wall More images
Service Wing, Raynham Hall	East Raynham, Raynham	Country House	c. 1731	24 January 1984	TF8816825792; 52°47′49″N 0°47′22″E	1305177	Upload Photo
Church of St Nicholas	Salthouse	Parish Church	14th century	4 October 1960	TG0761743678; 52°57′01″N 1°05′20″E	1152302	Church of St Nicholas More images
Church of All Saints	Scottow	Parish Church	14th century	16 April 1955	TG2655723740; 52°45′49″N 1°21′24″E	1049165	Church of All Saints More images
Enclosing Wall and Gatehouse to Waxham Hall	Waxham, Sea Palling	Wall	c. 1570	16 April 1955	TG4406226343; 52°46′46″N 1°37′03″E	1172520	Enclosing Wall and Gatehouse to Waxham Hall
Waxham Great Barn	Waxham, Sea Palling	Barn	c. 1570	16 April 1955	TG4391126202; 52°46′42″N 1°36′54″E	1172536	Waxham Great Barn More images
Waxham Hall	Waxham, Sea Palling	Farmhouse	c. 1800	16 April 1955	TG4386325874; 52°46′31″N 1°36′51″E	1049363	Waxham Hall More images
Church of St James	Southrepps	Parish Church	Medieval	4 October 1960	TG2567936794; 52°52′52″N 1°21′09″E	1373493	Church of St James More images
Church of St John the Baptist	Stiffkey	Parish Church	Late 13th century or early 14th century	6 March 1959	TF9747442985; 52°56′52″N 0°56′16″E	1373655	Church of St John the Baptist More images
Church of St Mary	Stody	Parish Church	15th century	4 October 1960	TG0558835061; 52°52′25″N 1°03′12″E	1304544	Church of St Mary More images
Church of St Margaret	Suffield	Parish Church	Medieval	24 April 1987	TG2331931246; 52°49′57″N 1°18′50″E	1049871	Church of St Margaret More images
Church of All Saints	Tatterford, Tattersett	Parish Church	13th century	6 March 1959	TF8516329194; 52°49′42″N 0°44′49″E	1172641	Church of All Saints More images
Church of St Botolph	Trunch	Parish Church	Late 14th century	16 April 1955	TG2871434856; 52°51′45″N 1°23′46″E	1306175	Church of St Botolph More images
Church of St Mary	Tunstead	Parish Church	14th century	16 April 1955	TG3086022713; 52°45′10″N 1°25′10″E	1152357	Church of St Mary More images
Church of All Saints	Upper Sheringham	Parish Church	Early 14th century	4 October 1960	TG1442841853; 52°55′52″N 1°11′20″E	1049800	Church of All Saints More images
Church of All Saints	Walcott	Parish Church	1427	16 April 1955	TG3605831754; 52°49′54″N 1°30′10″E	1169916	Church of All Saints More images
Church of All Saints and St Peter	Great Walsingham, Walsingham	Church	14th century	6 March 1959	TF9384937552; 52°54′02″N 0°52′50″E	1373997	Church of All Saints and St Peter More images
Church of St Mary and All Saints	Little Walsingham, Walsingham	Church	14th century	6 March 1959	TF9352836490; 52°53′28″N 0°52′31″E	1039385	Church of St Mary and All Saints More images
Flint Boundary Wall Enclosing Remains of St Mary's Friary, Extending from Rear of No 6 Market Place to a Point Roughly Opposite	Walsingham	Boundary Wall	Later than Medieval	15 February 1979	TF9323736554; 52°53′30″N 0°52′16″E	1039391	Upload Photo
Remains of St Mary's Friary	Walsingham	Kitchen	15th century	6 March 1959	TF9330036596; 52°53′31″N 0°52′19″E	1373991	Remains of St Mary's Friary More images
Remains of St Marys Priory	Walsingham	Church	15th century	30 November 1951	TF9354736777; 52°53′37″N 0°52′33″E	1171928	Remains of St Marys Priory More images
The Abbey	Walsingham	Country House	1720	30 November 1951	TF9350836732; 52°53′36″N 0°52′30″E	1039369	The Abbey More images
The Priory Gatehouse (or Abbey) Gatehouse. Wall adjoining Priory Gatehouse to south, fronting High Street	Walsingham	Wall	Late 19th century	30 November 1951	TF9350836754; 52°53′36″N 0°52′31″E	1374019	The Priory Gatehouse (or Abbey) Gatehouse. Wall adjoining Priory Gatehouse to south, fronting High Street More images
Church of St Mary Magdalene	Warham	Parish Church	Norman	6 March 1959	TF9428941674; 52°56′14″N 0°53′23″E	1049474	Church of St Mary Magdalene More images
Church of St Botolph	Westwick	Parish Church	Medieval	16 April 1955	TG2860325950; 52°46′58″N 1°23′18″E	1049134	Church of St Botolph More images
Weybourne Priory ruins	Weybourne	Augustinian Monastery	11th century	4 October 1960	TG1118843028; 52°56′35″N 1°08′30″E	1049802	Weybourne Priory ruins More images
Church of St Andrew	Wickmere, North Norfolk	Parish Church	Medieval	4 October 1960	TG1657133760; 52°51′28″N 1°12′56″E	1373464	Church of St Andrew More images
Wolterton Hall	Wolterton, Wickmere, North Norfolk	Country House	1726-1740	20 February 1952	TG1632231836; 52°50′26″N 1°12′38″E	1049875	Wolterton Hall More images
Church of All Saints	Wighton	Parish Church	c. 1300	6 March 1959	TF9406139953; 52°55′19″N 0°53′07″E	1171738	Church of All Saints More images
Church of St Margaret	Witton	Parish Church	Early 14th century	16 April 1955	TG3310431574; 52°49′52″N 1°27′32″E	1170243	Church of St Margaret More images
Church of St Peter	Ridlington, Witton	Parish Church	Early 14th century	16 April 1955	TG3456331084; 52°49′34″N 1°28′49″E	1170258	Church of St Peter More images
Church of St Mary	Wiveton	Parish Church	Medieval	6 March 1959	TG0436042800; 52°56′37″N 1°02′24″E	1373501	Church of St Mary More images
Church of St Mary	Worstead	Parish Church	Medieval	16 April 1955	TG3020026059; 52°46′59″N 1°24′43″E	1373814	Church of St Mary More images
