= Binham (disambiguation) =

Binham is a village and a civil parish in the English county of Norfolk.

Binham or Bynham may also refer to:

- Binham Priory, a ruined Benedictine priory in Binham, founded in the late 11th century
- Simon Binham (fl. c. 1335–1350), English chronicler and Benedictine monk of Binham Priory
- William Binham (fl. c. 1374–1396), English theologian and Benedictine prior of Wallingford, Berkshire
