= Barningham Hall =

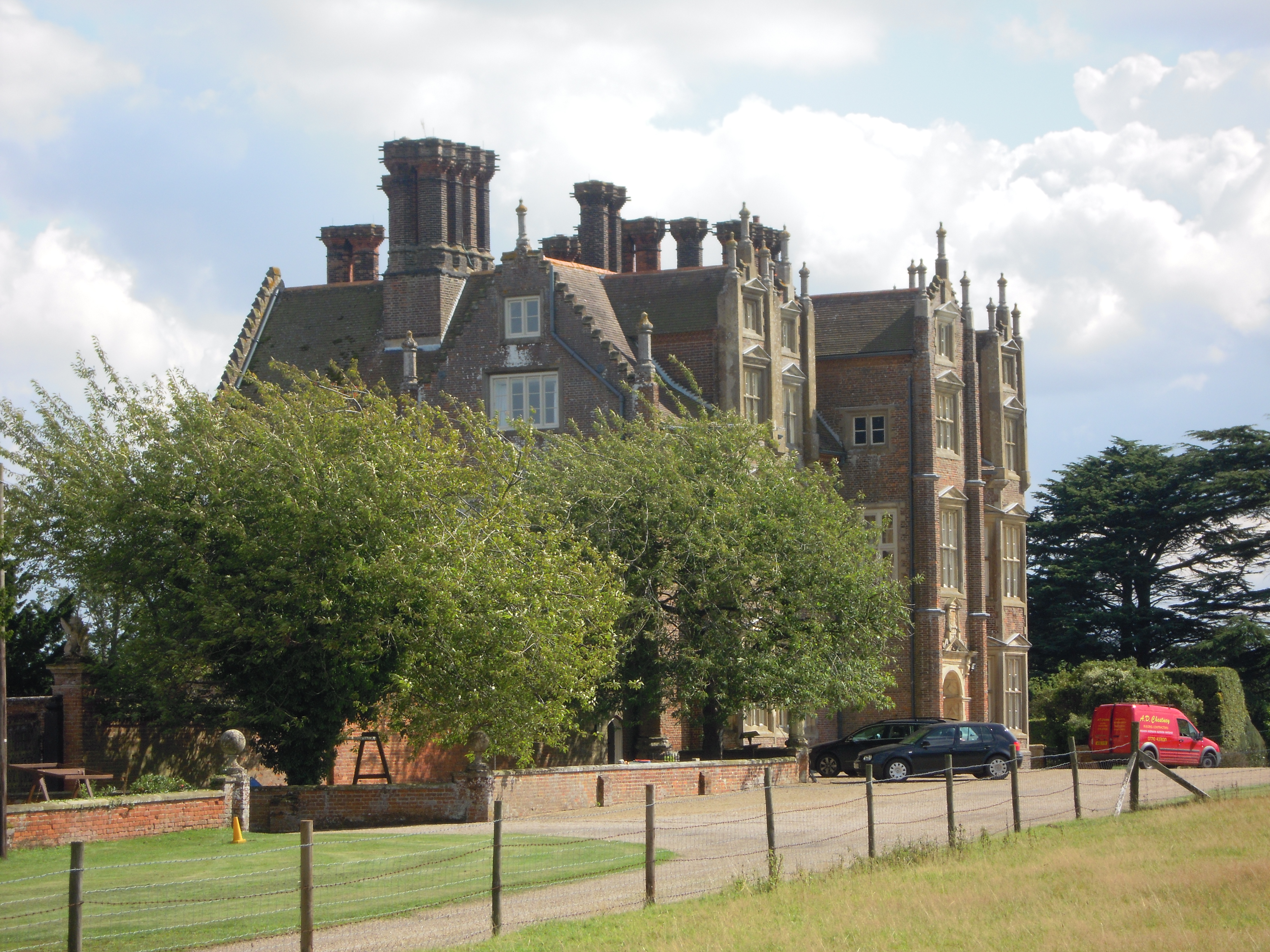
- Viewed from the north west

- Location within Norfolk

General information
- Type: Historic house
- Location: Barningham Winter, Barningham Hall, Matlask, Norfolk, NR11 7HY, Sheringham, England
- Coordinates: 52.873257°N 1.189029°E
- Completed: 1612
- Renovated: 1805
- Client: Sir Edward Paston

Design and construction
- Architects: John Adey Repton (hall), Humphrey Repton (1805 renovations)

Website

Listed Building – Grade I
- Designated: 20 February 1952
- Reference no.: 1373792

Barningham Hall is a privately owned Grade I listed country house and estate, half a mile north-west of the village of Matlaske in the English County of Norfolk, United Kingdom. The house was built for Sir Edward Paston in 1612, although the house seen today is the result of renovations, alterations and an enlargement project carried out under the supervision and design of Humphry Repton and his architect son John Adey Repton in 1805.

== Description ==
The hall stands within its 4,000 acre estate and was remodelled in 1805 by the Reptons. The main body of the structure is built in red brick with stone dressings. The west facing façade has five bays with the central bay used as the porch and front entrance to the house. This façade dates from the early house built by Paston. The porch has polygonal angled buttresses to each corner topped with finials. The bays continue up through the steep roof to form two storey dormers giving the hall an impression of height. The porch has a semicircular porch arch in stone, bearing the original halls construction date of 1612. The porch rises to the same height to give the façade symmetry. All the windows have stone mullions, transoms and pediments over the windows. The south facing façade was extensively re-modelled by the John Adey Repton. He added bays and replaced the windows although the crowstep gables with polygonal buttresses to the quoins are all survived from the original house. He also changed the east façade to include a simpler version of the crowstep gables in 1810. At this time Repton also added an extension to the east side of the hall which contained a kitchen and a gun room. Below the ground floor of the hall are the original enfilade cellars. The cellars have two staircase, one from the wine cellar to the kitchen and another to the principle entertaining rooms on the ground floor. On the roof there are polygonal chimneys with star shaped toppings. They sit upon a roof of plain red tiles with a castellated brick cornice around the eves

=== Other estate buildings ===
To the north of the hall is the coach house and stable block which are connected to the hall with high brick wall on the west and service building to the east. The stable and coach house are in an L shape and range to the north and the east of the courtyard and are both Grade II listed buildings. The east block which was the stable block has a wooden clock turret with a bell under a leaded cupola over a crow-stepped gabled bay. Either side are this central bay there are smaller crow-stepped gabled bay. The building is built in red Norfolk brick with a tile and pantile (Rear) roof. The northern side building was the coach house and coachman's cottage. The building is over three storeys and has three bays with equal sized crow-stepped gables. With dormers. It is built in red brick with some diaper decorative pattern built into the brick bond. The roof is of plain red tile with fish tail tiles to the front

== History ==
=== Curzun Family ===
After a period of time following the great survey known as the Domesday Book the manor of Barningham was in the ownership by William de Curzun. Curzun lived in the reign of Henry II. He was followed by Ralph Curzun and Sir Robert Curzun all of whom were lord of the manor. In 1345 the lands and manor of Barningham was in the ownership of John de Reppes. By 1361 the ownership had passed to William and Maude Wynter.

=== Wynter family ===
The hall that stands today was built in 1612 on land owned by the Wynter family and replaced a house which was demolished and stood a short distance from the present building. The old house had been the property of the Wynter family for many generations. The first member of the Wynter family of any note was William Wynter who twice served as the High Sheriff of the bailiwick of Norfolk and Suffolk in 1380 and 1392. He is recorded as owning the house and manor of Barningham Winter and when he died his son John Wynter inherited the manor of Barningham Winter along with the house. He was also lord of the manors of Matlask, Bessingham, Wickmere, Plumstead, Aldborough, and Baconsthorpe. His father also owned the manors of Egmere and Wighton and it is assumed that John was also lord at these places. John Wynter was a lawyer and worked in Royal administration, beginning seven years before King Richard II was overthrown. He served Richard for three terms as escheator. Following the deposition of Richard, Wynter was shrewd enough to support the return of Henry Bolingbroke in July 1399 to become King Henry IV of England. John Wynter died in 1414 leaving the house and estate to his son Edmund Wynter. Edmund was also in the legal profession and he died in 1448. In his will he left the manor house and all its contents to his widow as a life interest with it all being passed on to his eldest son John Wynter after her death. The house and title passed down several generations of Wynter's until the reign of Elizabeth I when the house and manor was sold to Sir Edward Paston.

=== The Pastons ===
The Paston family were a well connected and influential family in Norfolk. The patriarch Sir William Paston (1528–1610) who was the founder of the Paston Grammar School in North Walsham owned Caister Castle, Paston Hall and Oxnead Hall. Another member of the family, Sir Edward Paston (1550–1630), built and owned Appleton hall in 1599 and was on part of what is now the Sandringham Estate. In 1612 the existing manor house and estate at Barningham was acquired by another Paston Family member. His name was Sir Edward Paston (1550 – 1630) and he had the old Wynter manor house demolished and a new larger hall built a short distance from the old manor. Edward Paston died in 1630 at the age of 80. he left the house and estate to Clement Paston who was his grandson. He in turned left it to another Edward Paston. The fortunes of the Paston family declined by the 1730s. William Paston, 2nd Earl of Yarmouth (1654-1732) had converted to Anglicanism in 1689, but refused to swear allegiance to William and Mary and had subsequently lost all his offices. When he died he left the family with enormous debts and huge mortgages on the Paston Properties. In this financial confusion, Edward Paston abandoned the estate and hall at Barningham in 1736. It remained empty for the next twenty years and was sold in 1756 to settle Edward Paston's debts.

=== Subsequent ownership ===
The house and estate were purchased from Paston by William Russell from London, who was a whale bone merchant who also had interests in the West Indies. Roughly crushed whale bones were used to renovate pastures in Britain in the late eighteenth century and used extensively in East Anglia creating huge profits for the bone merchants. Russell was one such gentleman. Kings Lynn was a major port for the whale industry and there were several whale bone and oil processing mills in the area including Narborough and Congham. Barningham Hall was an ideal location for Russell being close to these whale business operations. However Russell only held the property for 19 years and he sold the estate to Thomas Lane in 1775. Ten years later in 1785 Lane sold the estate to Thomas Vertue Mott. The Hall and estate has remained with this family until the present day.

== Gallery ==
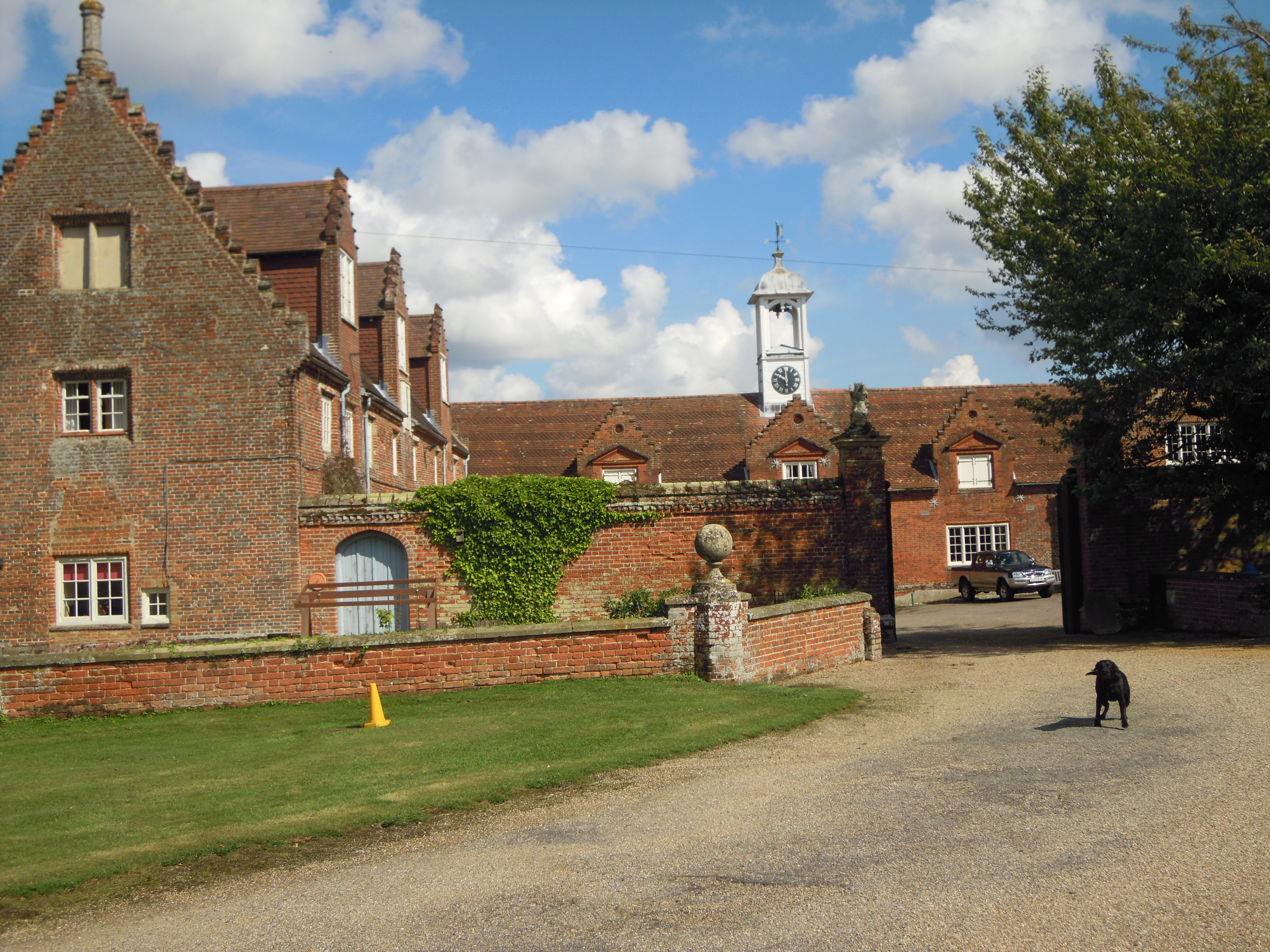
The stable block and coach house designed by John Adey Repton in 1805.

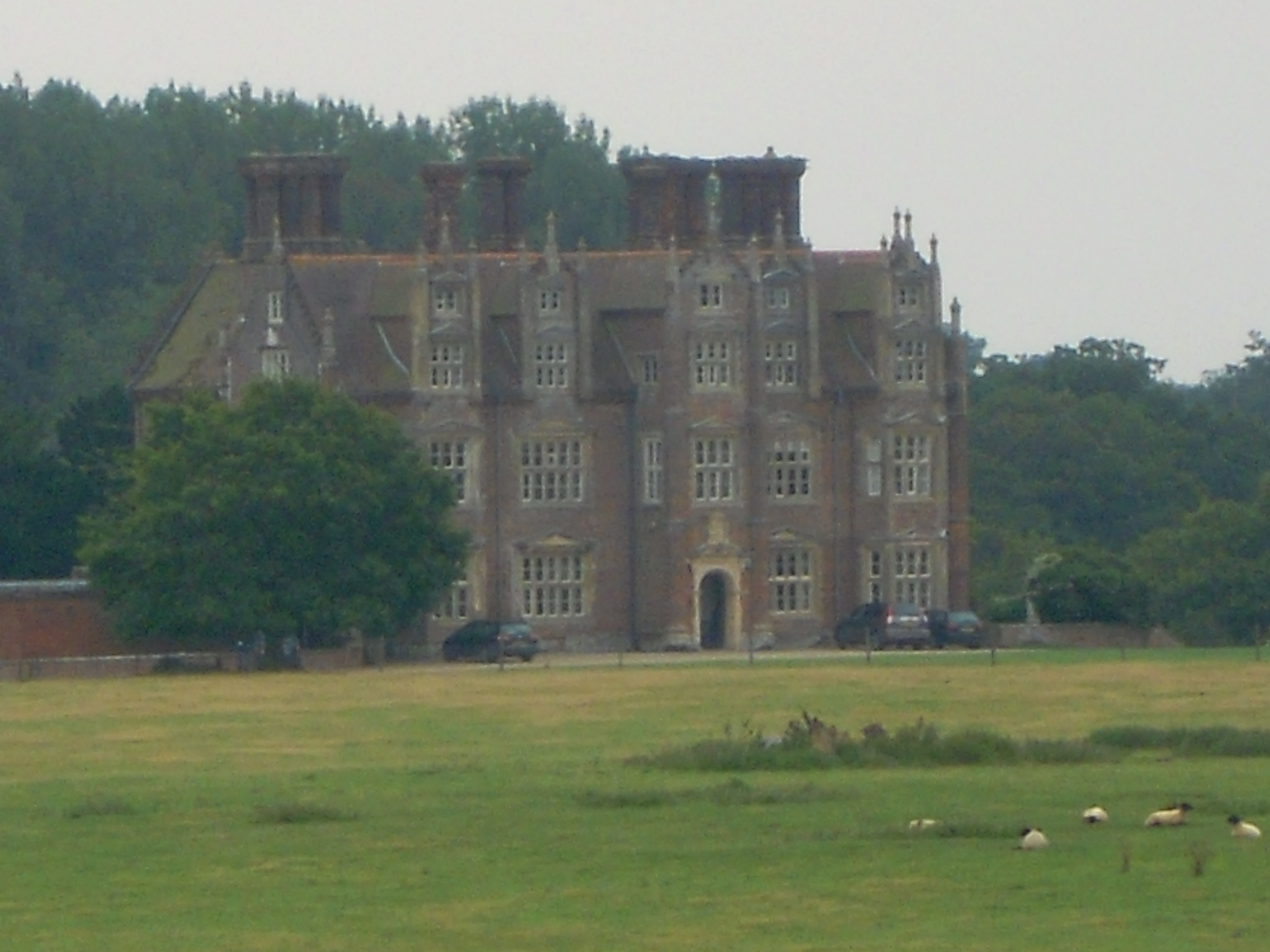
Front elevation of the Hall.

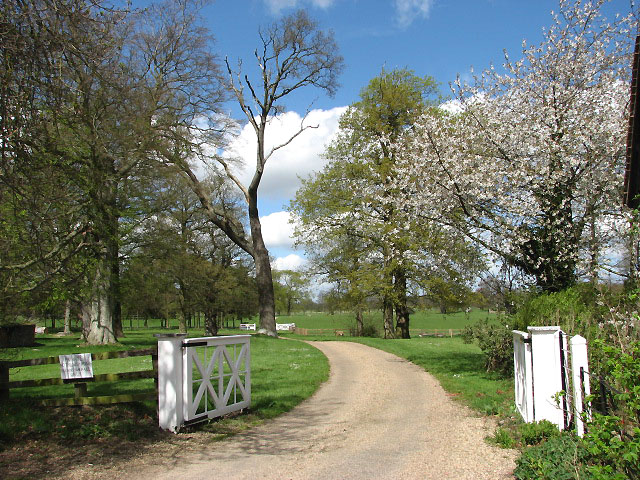
Entrance and driveway to Barningham Hall from the village of Matlask.

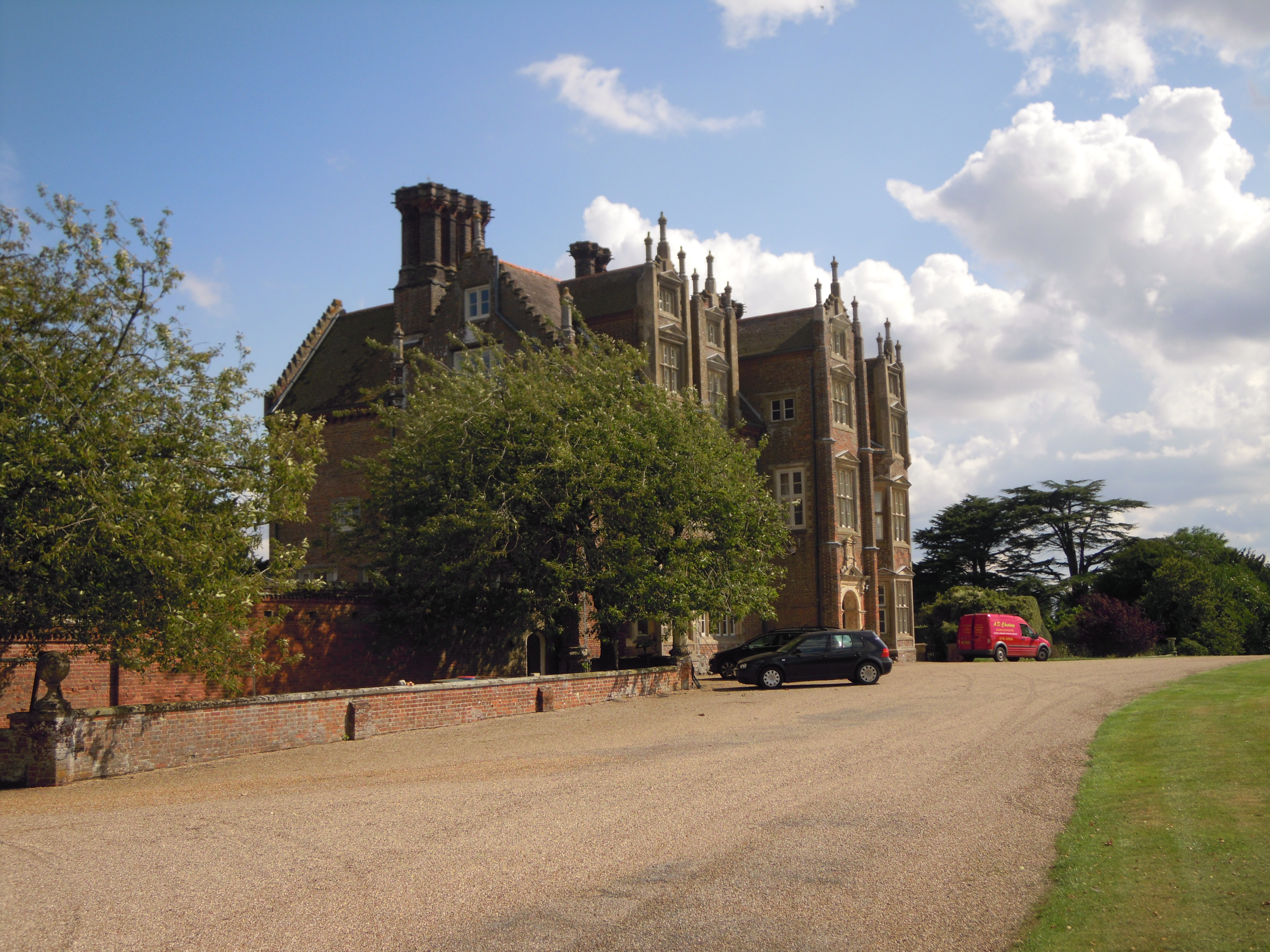
Barningham Hall viewed from the north-west.
