= Church of St Catherine, Ludham =

Coordinates: 52°42′34″N 1°32′02″E

St Catherine's Church
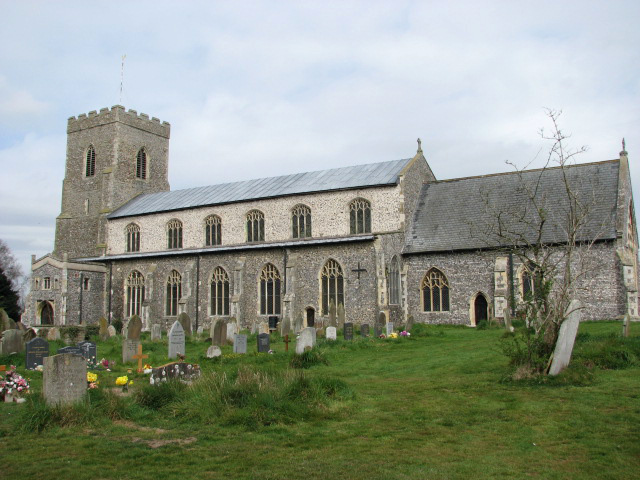
- St Catherine's Church
- Location: Ludham, Norfolk
- Country: England
- Denomination: Church of England

History
- Dedication: St Catherine of Alexandria

Architecture
- Heritage designation: Grade I
- Style: Early English, Perpendicular

Administration
- Province: Canterbury
- Diocese: Norwich

Clergy
- Priest: Gary Noyes

St Catherine's Church is a Church of England church in Ludham, Norfolk. It is noted for its tympanum and rood screen, both painted and both pre-reformation survivals. The church is recorded in the National Heritage List for England as a grade I listed building and is dedicated to St Catherine of Alexandria, whose symbol - the wheel - appears in the spandrels of the hammerbeam roof.

== History ==
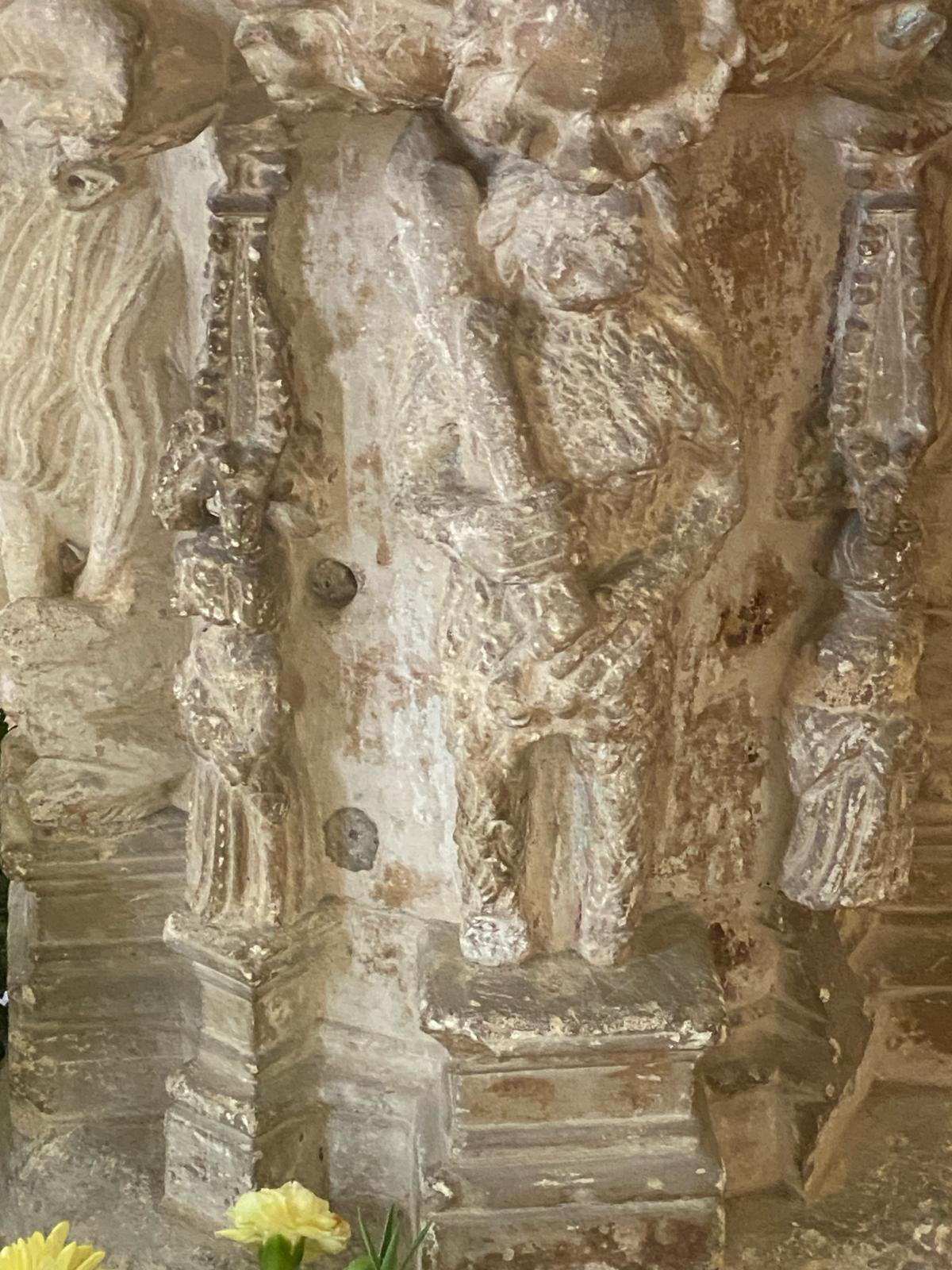
The font of St Catherine's, depicting a female wodewose

The decorated gothic west tower and chancel date from the 14th century, while the perpendicular gothic nave and aisles date from the 15th century. However, a church is known to have existed on the site from the 11th century onwards. Unusually, the rector of St Catherine's is also the Bishop of Norwich. This is due to the expropriation of the revenues of the church by the Abbot of St Benet's in 1220 - the successor to whom was later made Bishop of Norwich by Henry VIII.

The rebuilding of the nave, roof and aisles in the 15th century would have been greatly assisted by the integration of the church and St Benet's in the lucrative East Anglian wool trade.

The 15th century octagonal font is distinguished for its highly unusual depiction of a female wodewose. The top is rounded with the symbols of the four evangelists.

== Tympanum ==
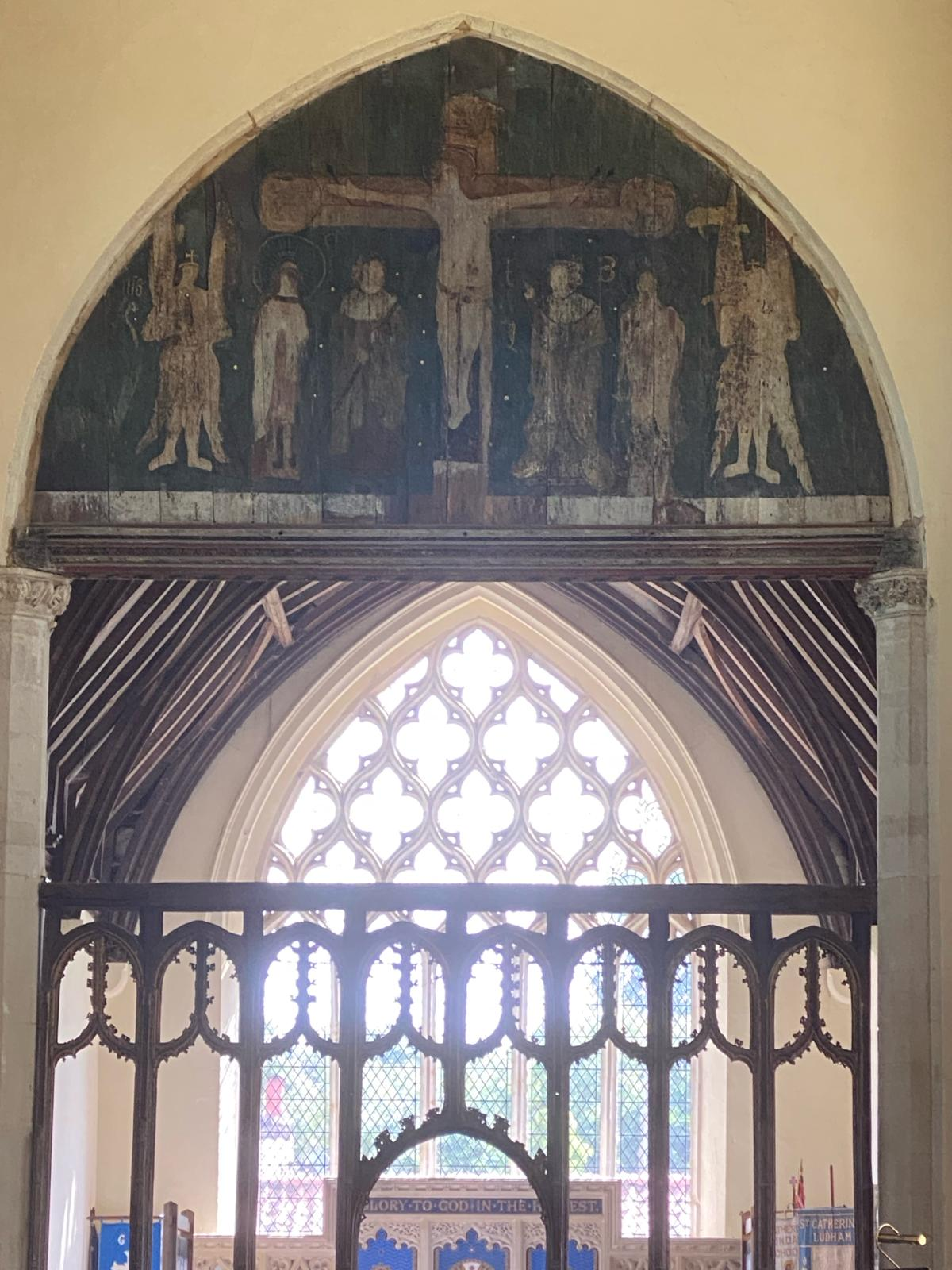
The tympanum of St Catherine's

An extremely rare painted tympanum survives, separating the nave from the chancel. The west side depicts the crucifixion, while on the east side the coat of arms of Elizabeth I are shown. These arms were originally painted on a canvas nailed over the crucifixion, but were removed at an unknown stage and replaced on the reverse side in 1890.

== Rood Screen ==
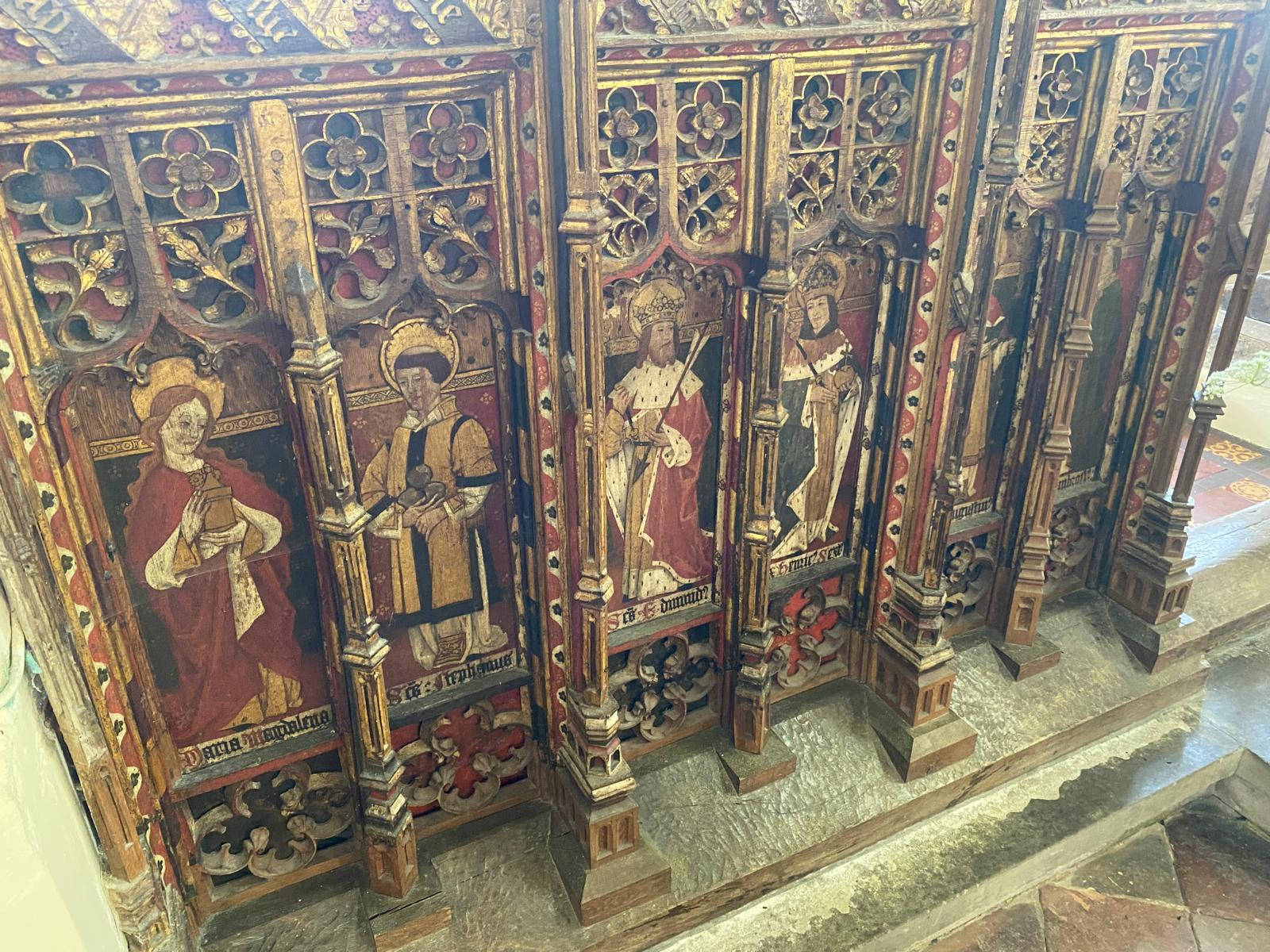
The rood screen of St Catherine's

Besides the tympanum, the 1493 Rood Screen is the other notable artistic feature of St Catherine. Described by Pevsner as of "exceptionally good quality", it depicts, from left to right:

- St Mary Magdalene
- St Stephen
- St Edmund
- King Henry VI
- St Augustine
- St Ambrose
- St Gregory
- St Jerome
- King Edward the Confessor
- St Walstan
- St Lawrence
- St Apollonia

== See also ==
Grade I listed buildings in North Norfolk
