= Matlaske =

Village in Norfolk, England

Coordinates: 52.86856°N 1.19584°E

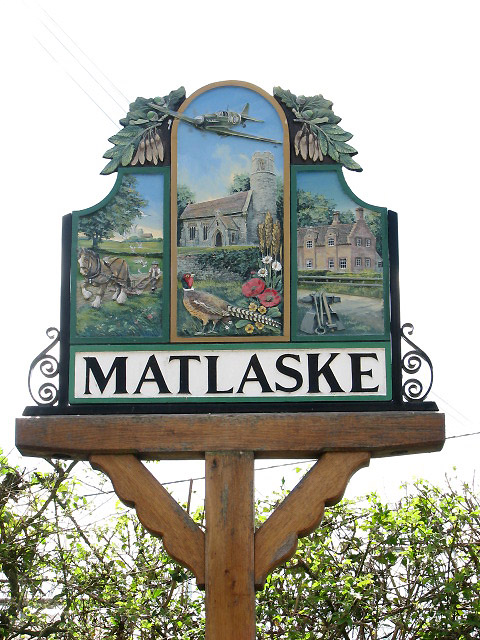
- Village sign

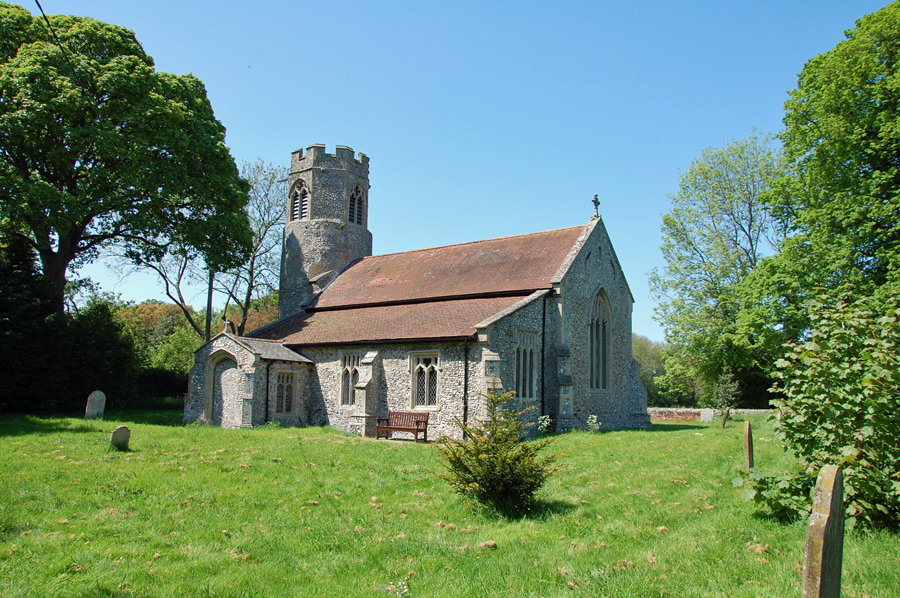
- St Peter's church

- Location within Norfolk
- Area: 5.45 km^{2} (2.10 sq mi)
- Population: 139 (parish, 2011 census)
  - Density: 26/km^{2} (67/sq mi)
- OS grid reference: TG1534
  - London: 136 miles (219 km)
- Civil parish: Matlask
- District: North Norfolk
- Shire county: Norfolk
- Region: East
- Country: England
- Sovereign state: United Kingdom
- Post town: NORWICH
- Postcode district: NR11
- Dialling code: 01263
- Police: Norfolk
- Fire: Norfolk
- Ambulance: East of England
- UK Parliament: North Norfolk

Matlaske is a village and a civil parish in the English county of Norfolk. The village is 21.6 miles (34.8 km) North-north-west of Norwich, 9.3 miles (15.0 km) south-west of Cromer and 136 miles (219 km) north-north-east of London. The nearest railway station is at Sheringham for the Bittern Line which runs between Sheringham, Cromer and Norwich. The nearest airport is Norwich International Airport. The parish of Matlask in the 2001 census, a population of 124, increasing to 139 at the 2011 Census. For the purposes of local government, the parish falls within the district of North Norfolk.

== Description ==
The Ordnance Survey and North Norfolk Council Information spell the village name 'Matlaske' while the parish name is 'Matlask', without the 'e'. The name comes from Old English and means 'Ash tree where meetings are held'. The village is located in the north of the county and sits just outside the landscaped grounds of Barningham Hall.

== History ==
Matlaske has an entry in the Domesday Book of 1085. In the great book Matlaske is recorded by the name of Matelasc, Matelesc or Matingeles. The parish is recorded as king's land in the custody of Godric; from Count Alan and Ribald. Their oldest resident was Mrs Mary Hook who died in 2017, aged 103 and is buried at Barningham Church.

=== The Second World War ===
During the summer of 1940 Matlaske became home to a satellite airfield to RAF Coltishall which is located 12 miles (19 km) south east of the village. By October 1940 two grass runways were in operation here. On 27 October Coltishall was bombed which instigated the Spitfires of No 27 squadron to be the first operational aircraft at Matlaske. Two days after the move Matlaske itself was attacked by the Luftwaffe when five enemy aircraft strafed the field causing slight damage to the parked Spitfires and causing some casualties to people. In November 1941 Westland Whirlwinds of 137 squadron were moved from Coltishall to Matlaske. On 12 February 1942 the Whirlwinds were sent on an operation to prevent the Channel dash of the German warships Scharnhorst, Gneisenau and Prinz Eugen from Brest to the safety of German north sea ports. Four out of the six Whirlwinds were lost during the action. In September 1942 the airfield was offered to USAAF as base for one of their fighter groups, which was not taken up. In August 1944 the airfield was closed to flying. By September 1944 it was re-opened with No 150 Wing of the Second Tactical Air Force taking up residence using Mustang III's. In October Spitfires where back on the base with 229, 453 and 602 Squadrons. They launched missions from Matlaske to the continent to try to destroy V-2 rocket sites. The last operational sorties were launched from Matlaske by the Spitfires of 453 squadron in April 1945. After the squadron left the base was deserted and was quickly given up by the RAF and was one of the first airfields to be handed back to farming. The old control tower still stands and can be found to the east of the village on the Holt road.

== Prominent buildings ==
=== The parish church of Saint Peter ===
The parish church at Matlaske dates as far back as the Saxon period and has a round tower of Norman origins, part of the original church which stood here between 1066 and 1189. During a service on 19 March 1726 the chancel collapsed and was never rebuilt. Miraculously no-one was hurt. The church was restored in 1878. The building is constructed from coursed flint work with some stone dressing on the roof where there are plain and fish scale tiles. Most of the roof dates from 1878 and is supported on corbels carved with rustic faces, dating from the medieval period, although the roof of the south aisle dates from 1710. The font dates from the 15th century. On one wall is a restored canvas with the royal coat of arms of George III. In front of the sanctuary hangs a large brass chandelier.

=== Barningham Hall ===
A short distance North West of the village is the Barningham estate and within it Barningham Hall, a grade I listed building. The mansion was built in 1612 for Sir Edward Paston, constructed in red brick and stone and is a fine example of Jacobean architecture. The west elevation has a three-storey porch tower with two-storied dormer windows. The south elevation was remodelled in 1805 by Humphrey and John Adey Repton. They also installed a central oriel window and extra bay windows and had a hand in much of the interior work although there is panelling and plasterwork which date back to the 17th century. The landscaped grounds are also the work of the Reptons. They created the park, lake and woodlands and set out the terrace on the south of the house. An avenue of oak trees leads to the west front of the hall. There is also a walled kitchen garden. In the grounds are the remains of Saint Mary's church, where the MP Sir Charles Mott-Radclyffe, his first wife Diana Mott-Radclyffe and second wife Stella, Lady Mott-Radclyffe are buried. The film 'Brothers of the Hood' was shot in the grounds of Barningham. It continues to be privately owned by descendants of the Mott-Radclyffe Family.

=== Matlaske Old School House ===
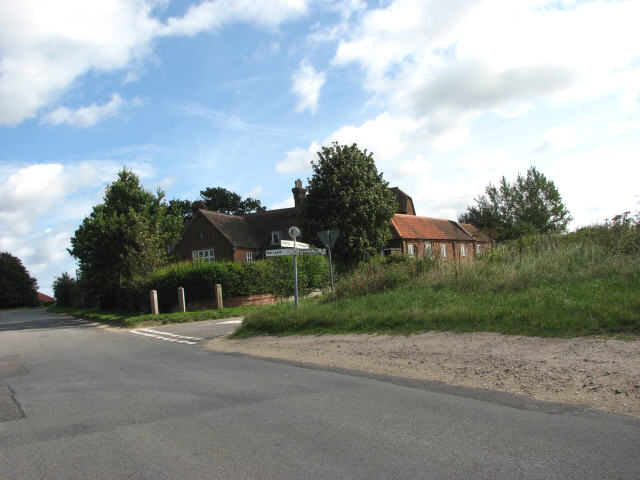
The old School House

On the south west lane out of the village at a road junction is the old school house which was built in 1876 but was closed in 1964. The school served as a village hall until the late 1970s when the property was renovated and turned into private dwellings.

== Bibliography ==
- Wood, Duncan (2020) Matlaske History, Volume 1 (Amazon)
- Wood, Duncan (2021) Matlaske History, Volume 2 (Amazon)
- Wood, Duncan (2021) Matlaske History, Volume 3 (Amazon)
