= Holy Trinity Church, Ingham =

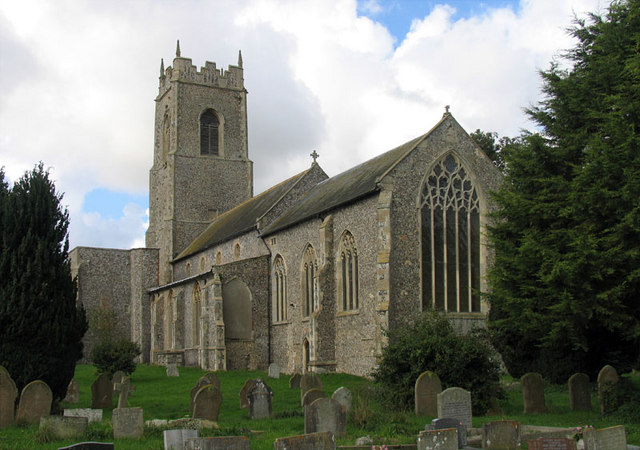
- Holy Trinity Church, Ingham
- Holy Trinity Church, Ingham
- 52.7788°N 1.5438°E
- OS grid reference: TG 39100 26012
- Location: Ingham
- Country: England
- Denomination: Church of England

History
- Dedication: Holy Trinity

Architecture
- Heritage designation: Grade I listed

Holy Trinity Church in Ingham, Norfolk, England has been designated as a Grade I listed building by Historic England. The tower dates from the 15th century.
