= Ingham, Norfolk =

Village in Norfolk, England

Coordinates: 52.77889°N 1.54379°E

Ingham
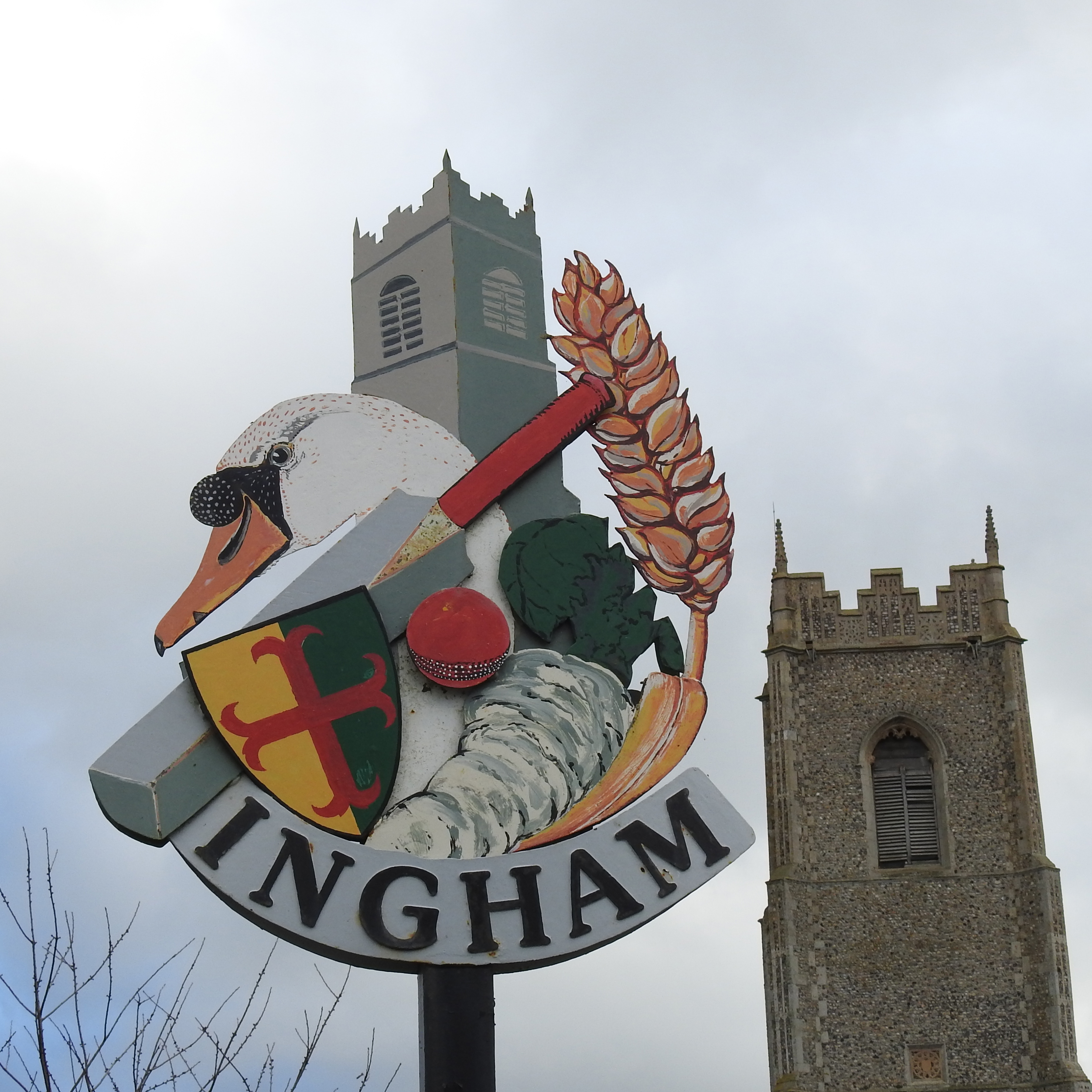
- Ingham Village Sign

- Location within Norfolk
- Area: 2.37 sq mi (6.1 km^{2})
- Population: 362 (2021 census)
  - Density: 153/sq mi (59/km^{2})
- OS grid reference: TG 390 260
  - London: 135 miles (217 km)
- Civil parish: Ingham
- District: North Norfolk
- Shire county: Norfolk
- Region: East
- Country: England
- Sovereign state: United Kingdom
- Post town: NORWICH
- Postcode district: NR12
- Dialling code: 01692
- UK Parliament: North Norfolk

Ingham is a village and civil parish in the English county of Norfolk.

Ingham is located 6.9 miles (11.1 km) south-east of North Walsham and 15 miles (24 km) north-east of Norwich. The parish includes the hamlet of Calthorpe Street.

== History ==
Ingham's name is of Anglo-Saxon origin and derives from the Old English for Inga's homestead, possibly linked to the Germanic Ingaevones tribe.

In the Domesday Book, Ingham is listed as a settlement of 45 households in the hundred of Happing. In 1086, the village was divided between the East Anglian estates of Count Alan of Brittany and St Benet's Abbey.

The Lordship of Ingham was possessed at a very early date by the Ingham family. An Oliver de Ingham was living in 1183 and a John de Ingham is known to have been Lord in the reign of Richard I. The great-grandson of John, the distinguished Oliver Ingham lived here and his son-in-law Miles Stapleton of Bedale, Yorkshire, inherited jure uxoris.

Ingham Old Hall has its origins in the medieval times having been built circa 1320. In the 14th century the Hall was inhabited by the local Lord of the Manor, Sir Miles Stapleton, whose tomb stands in Ingham's Holy Trinity church alongside that of his father in law, Sir Oliver de Ingham.

A tower mill was built in Ingham c.1763. It was replaced by another tower mill c.1872, which survives.

== Geography ==
According to the 2021 census, Ingham has a population of 362 people which shows a decrease from the 374 people recorded in the 2011 census.

== Holy Trinity Church ==
Ingham's parish church was built the 1340s by Sir Oliver Ingham and later attached to a Trinitarian Priory from the 1360s, built by Sir Miles Stapleton. Holy Trinity stands on Mill Road and has been Grade I listed since 1955. The church holds Sunday service twice monthly.

Holy Trinity holds several carved stone memorials to Sir Oliver Ingham and Sir Roger de Bois with his wife Lady Margaret.

== Amenities ==
The village has one public house, The Ingham Swan, which is one of only two public houses tied to the Woodforde's Brewery of Woodbastwick in Norfolk. The original building was built in the 14th century and was part of Ingham Priory until its destruction under Henry VIII in the 16th century. In Spring 2010 it was renamed The Ingham Swan to avoid confusion with The Swan in nearby Stalham. The building has had much interior renovation.

== Governance ==
Ingham is part of the electoral ward of Happisburgh for local elections and is part of the district of North Norfolk.

The village's national constituency is North Norfolk, which has been represented by the Liberal Democrat Steff Aquarone MP since 2024.

== War Memorial ==
Ingham War Memorial is a tall marble memorial located inside Holy Trinity Churchyard which lists the following names for the First World War:

Rank	Name	Unit	Date of death	Burial/Commemoration
2Lt.	Charles W. S. Littlewood MC	7th Coy., Royal Engineers	10 Jul. 1917	London Cemetery
Cpl.	John R. Claxton	2nd Bn., Essex Regiment	3 May 1917	Arras Memorial
Pte.	Bertie J. Pestell	Norfolk Regiment	11 Nov. 1916	Holy Trinity Churchyard
Pte.	Alfred W. Hunt	1st Bn., Norfolk Regt.	23 Apr. 1917	Arras Memorial
Pte.	Robert W. Woolston	8th Bn., Norfolk Regt.	26 Apr. 1918	Crouy British Cemetery
Dhd.	Samuel H. Rudram	H.M.Trawler Thomas Cornwall	29 Oct. 1918	Chatham Naval Memorial

The following name was added after the Second World War:

Rank	Name	Unit	Date of death	Burial/Commemoration
LAC	Walter J. Hales	No. 228 Squadron RAF (Sunderlands)	25 Aug. 1942	Holy Trinity Churchyard
