= Simon Binham =

English Benedictine monk and chronicler (fl. c. 1350)

Dom. Simon Binham O.S.B.

Personal life
- Flourished: c. 1335–1350

Religious life
- Religion: Catholic

Simon Binham or Bynham (fl. c. 1335–1350) was an English chronicler and Benedictine monk of the priory of Binham, Norfolk. He assisted the prior of Binham in opposing the exactions of Hugh, abbot of St. Albans, and was imprisoned for some time with the other rebellious monks. He is said to have contributed to the continuation of the Chronicle of Rishanger, but his other writings are largely lost.

== Life ==
Simon Binham was probably a native of East Anglia. He became a monk of the Benedictine priory of Binham, Norfolk, one of the cells belonging to the abbey of St. Albans.

He is first recorded as upholding his prior, William Somerton, in resisting the perceived unjust exactions of Hugh, abbot of St. Albans (1308–1326). The cause of the Binham monks was taken up by the gentry of the neighbourhood, and Sir Robert Walkefare, the patron of the cell, prevailed on Thomas, 2nd Earl of Lancaster, to uphold them. Emboldened by this support, the prior and his monks refused to admit the visitation of the abbot, and the gentlemen of their party garrisoned the priory against him. The abbot, however, appealed to the king, Edward II, who ordered the prior's supporters to return to their homes. Simon and the other rebellious monks were brought to St. Albans and imprisoned. After a while they were released and admitted into the brotherhood, but as a mark of disgrace were sentenced to walk in fetters in all processions of the convent.

Simon lived to become an influential member of the house, for in the time of Abbot Michael (1336–1349) he was chosen by the chapter as one of the three receivers or treasurers of the collections made for the support of scholars and needy brethren.

== Works ==
In a notice of the historians of St. Albans, Simon Binham is said to have written after Henry Blankfrount or Blaneforde, and before Richard Savage. The works of Binham and Savage are largely lost, or at least are unidentified. It has, however, been suggested that Binham may have written some of the fragments published in the Rolls edition of the Chronicle of Rishanger.

== Sources ==
- Stow, George B. (2004). "Binham, Simon (fl. c. 1350), Benedictine monk and chronicler". Oxford Dictionary of National Biography (online ed.). Oxford University Press. doi:10.1093/ref:odnb/2418. (Subscription, Wikipedia Library access or UK public library membership required.)

Attribution:

- This article incorporates text from a publication now in the public domain: Hunt, William (1886). "Binham, Simon". In Stephen, Leslie (ed.). Dictionary of National Biography. Vol. 5. London: Smith, Elder & Co. p. 56.
