= Walsingham Friary =

Franciscan friary in Norfolk, England

Coordinates: 52.8921°N 0.8720°E

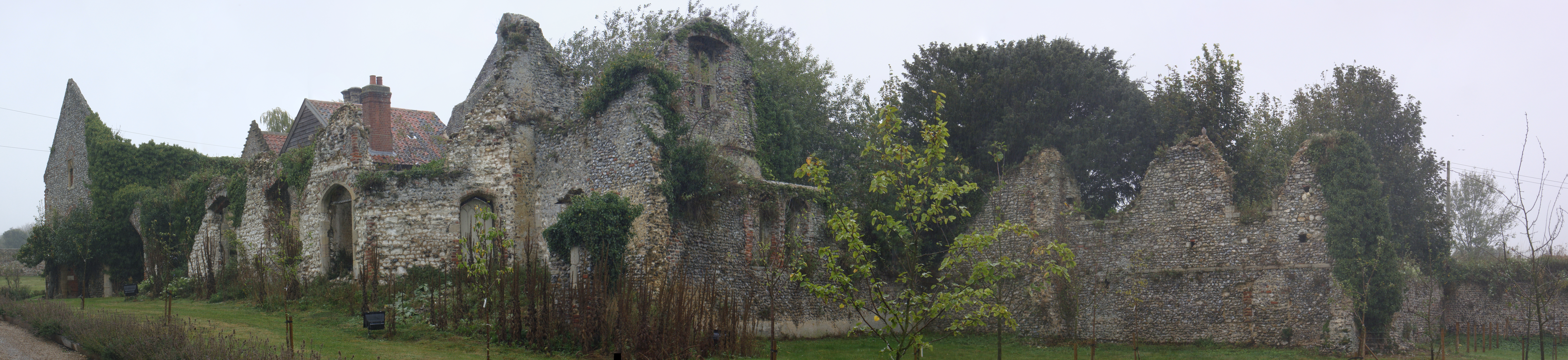
The remains of Walsingham Friary

Walsingham Friary was a Franciscan friary at Walsingham, Norfolk, England. It was founded in 1347 and suppressed in the 16th century in the Dissolution of the Monasteries.
