= Thomas Paston =

16th-century English politician

Sir Thomas Paston (by 1517 – 4 September 1550), of London, was an English politician.

He was a son of Bridget Heydon, a daughter of Sir Henry Heydon of Baconsthorpe, and Sir William Paston (c.1479 – 1554), a son of Sir John Paston and his first wife, Margery Brewes.

In 1539, Sir Thomas benefitted from the dissolution of the monasteries by gaining access to the wealth of Binham Priory. He demolished some of the priory to use the stones to build a house in Wells-next-the-Sea.

He was a member of parliament (MP) for Norfolk in 1545.

By 1544, he married Agnes, daughter of Sir John Leigh of Stockwell, Surrey. They raised two sons and one daughter.
