= Cockthorpe =

Village in Norfolk, England

Coordinates: 52.94°N 0.94°E

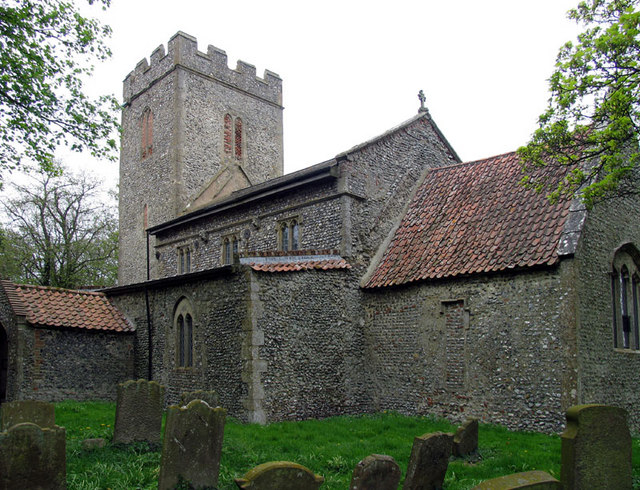
- All Saints' Church

- Location within Norfolk
- OS grid reference: TG982422
- Civil parish: Binham
- District: North Norfolk
- Shire county: Norfolk
- Region: East
- Country: England
- Sovereign state: United Kingdom
- Post town: Wells-next-the-Sea
- Postcode district: NR23
- Dialling code: 01328
- Police: Norfolk
- Fire: Norfolk
- Ambulance: East of England
- UK Parliament: North Norfolk

Cockthorpe is a village and former civil parish, now in the parish of Binham, in the North Norfolk district, in the English county of Norfolk.

Cockthorpe is located 6.4 miles (10.3 km) north-west of Holt and 26 miles (42 km) north-west of Norwich.

== History ==
The village's name is of mixed Viking and Anglo-Saxon origin and derives from an amalgamation of the Old Norse and Old English for a outlying farmstead or settlement with an abundance of either chickens or gamebirds.

In the Domesday Book of 1086, Cockthorpe is recorded as a settlement of 5 households in the hundred of Greenhoe. In 1086, the village formed parts of the estates of William de Beaufeu.

In the 17th century, Cockthorpe provided a number of notable Royal Navy officers, including Sir Christopher Myngs, Sir John Narborough, and Sir Cloudesley Shovell.

Between 1940 and 1961, Cockthorpe was host to RAF Langham, a satellite airfield for RAF Bircham Newton operated by RAF Coastal Command.

== Geography ==
In 1931 the parish had a population of 55, this was the last time that separate population statistics were collated for Cockthorpe. On 1 April 1935 the parish was abolished and merged with Binham.

The nearest railway station is at Sheringham for the Bittern Line which runs between Sheringham, Cromer and Norwich. The nearest airport is Norwich International Airport.

== All Saints' Church ==
Cockthorpe's parish church is located on Airfield Road and dates back to the Eleventh or Twelfth Centuries.

All Saints' fell into disuse during the Second World War but features Medieval wall paintings which were uncovered in the 1990s as well as stained-glass windows designed by J. & J. King of Norwich.

== Notable residents ==
- Colonel Christopher Calthorpe- (c.1560-1662) Virginian settler and representative, born in Cockthorpe.
- Vice-Admiral Sir Christopher Myngs- (1625-1666) naval officer and privateer, likely born in Cockthorpe.
- Admiral Sir John Narborough- (1640-1688) naval officer, likely born or lived in Cockthorpe.
- Fleet Admiral Sir Cloudesley Shovell- (1650-1707) naval officer, born in Cockthorpe.

== Governance ==
Cockthorpe is part of the electoral ward of Priory for local elections and is part of the district of North Norfolk.

The village's national constituency is North Norfolk, which has been represented by the Liberal Democrat Steff Aquarone MP since 2024.

== War Memorial ==
There is no war memorial in Cockthorpe and it is possible that the village is one of the undocumented Thankful Villages.
