= Binham =

Village in Norfolk, England

Coordinates: 52.918°N 0.949°E

- village
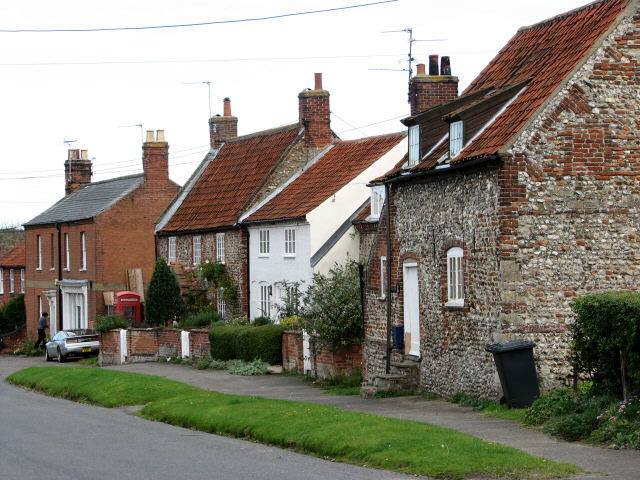
- Flint Cottages, Binham, Norfolk

- Location within Norfolk
- Area: 11.52 km^{2} (4.45 sq mi)
- Population: 319 (2021 Census)
  - Density: 28/km^{2} (73/sq mi)
- OS grid reference: TF 980 390
  - London: 124 miles (200 km)
- Civil parish: Binham CP
- District: North Norfolk
- Shire county: Norfolk
- Region: East
- Country: England
- Sovereign state: United Kingdom
- Post town: FAKENHAM
- Postcode district: NR21
- Dialling code: 01328
- Police: Norfolk
- Fire: Norfolk
- Ambulance: East of England
- UK Parliament: North Norfolk

Binham is a village and a civil parish in the English county of Norfolk. It is 29.3 miles (47.2 km) north west of Norwich, 16.9 miles (27.2 km) west of Cromer, and 4.9 miles (7.9 km) east-south-east of the town of Wells-next-the-Sea.

== History ==
Binham's name is of Anglo-Saxon origin. Despite its Anglo-Saxon origins, there is evidence of human settlement within the parish from long before this period. There are archeological records such as Neolithic tools and Roman coins & pottery.

The village is listed in the Domesday Book of 1085 under the name of Benincham, and Bin(n)eham as a settlement of 65 households in the hundred of North Greenhoe. Binham was part of the estates of Peter de Valognes and featured two mills within the parish.

There are numerous 17th-century buildings within Binham which are all Grade II listed, including Chapel Corner, Manor Farmhouse and Ivy Farm. Between 2009 and 2023 a series of archaeological test pits were dug in the parish. The report was published in 2017.

=== 1990 aircraft incident ===
On Wednesday 2 May 1990 General Dynamics F-111 Aardvark '70-2368' of the 492nd Tactical Fighter Squadron at RAF Lakenheath had an engine fire, from a fan disc failure, and crashed three miles south of Blakeney Point. Part of the aircraft went through a cottage roof.

The aircrew landed near Wighton.

- Capt. David F. Ratcliffe, pilot
- First Lt. Brian W. Kirkwood, WSO

== Geography ==
The nearest railway station is at Sheringham for the Bittern Line which runs between Cromer and Norwich. The nearest airport is Norwich International Airport.

The civil parish has an area of 11.52 km^{2} (4.45 sq mi) and in the 2001 census had a population of 273 in 124 households, including Cockthorpe and increasing to 292 at the 2011 census. In the 2021 Census, Binham (including Cockthorpe) had a population of 319 people.

Amenities within the village include a shop and petrol station and a public house. The Chequers Inn is Grade II listed and dates to the 17th-century.

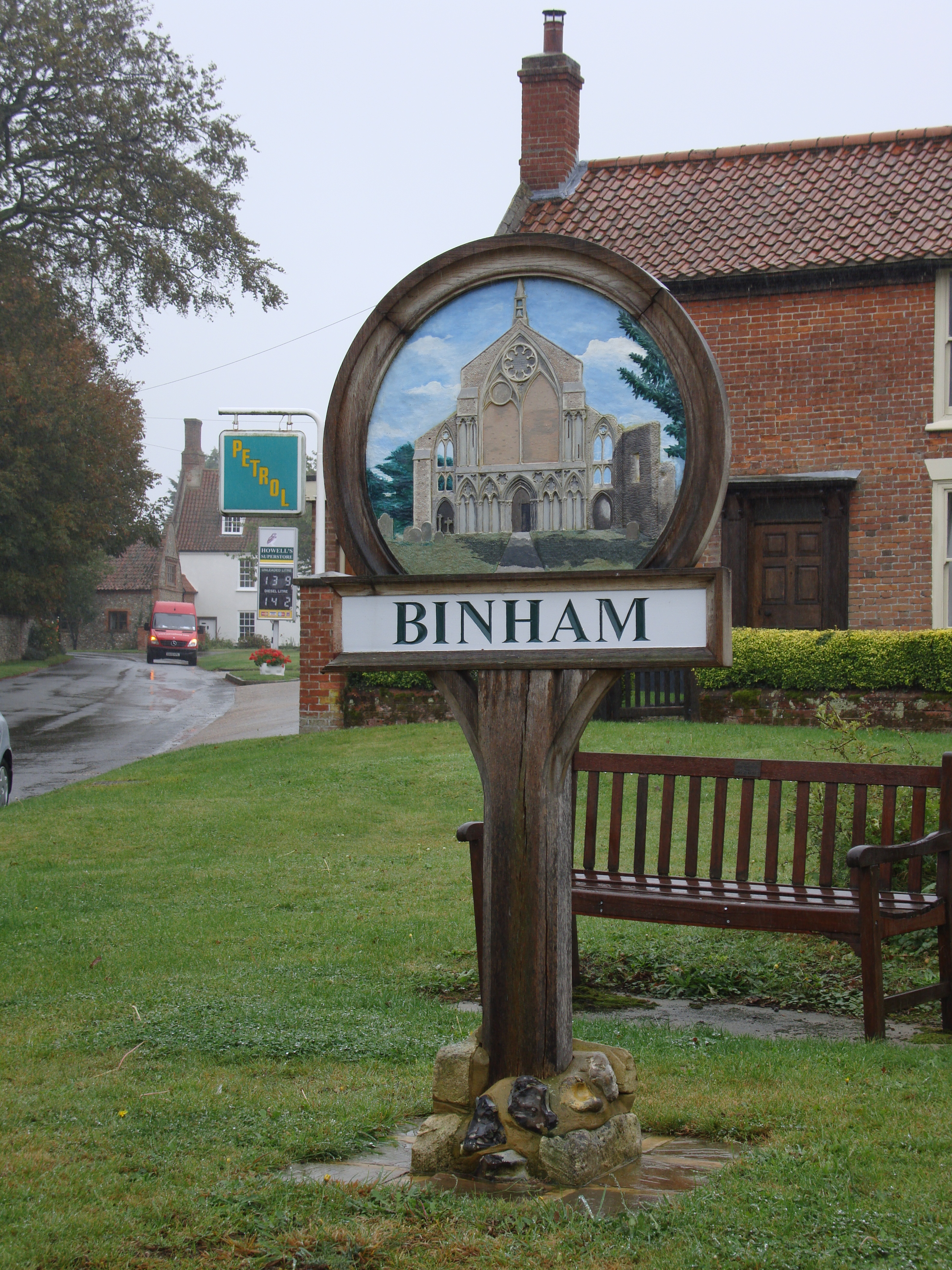
Binham village sign, depicting the priory

== Binham Priory and St. Mary's church ==
Close to the village are the remains of the Benedictine St Mary's Priory. Today the nave of the much larger priory church has become the Church of Saint Mary and the Holy Cross and is still used as a place of worship. The remains of the priory are in the care of English Heritage. Both are Grade I listed buildings.

== Governance ==
Binham is part of the electoral ward of Priory for local elections and is part of the district of North Norfolk. It forms part of the North Norfolk parliamentary constituency.

== Binham Market Cross ==
It is one of the best surviving examples of a medieval standing cross in Norfolk. It is situated on the triangular green in the centre of the village near the church. The 15th-century cross is built of Barnack limestone and consists of a socket stone and separate shaft. The 2-metre tall base is made of mortared flint rubble with stepped courses of stone blocks, capped by a platform of thin slabs. The weathered remains of an ornamental moulding can still be seen partway up the shaft, but the stone cross that originally topped the shaft is missing. Many cross-heads were destroyed by iconoclasts during the 16th and 17th centuries. Following the grant of a charter by King Henry I granted the village a charter, so that an annual fair and a weekly market could be held here from the early 12th century, and fairs were allowed to be convened on the green until the early 1950s.
