= Binham Priory =

Coordinates: 52.91997°N 0.94523°E

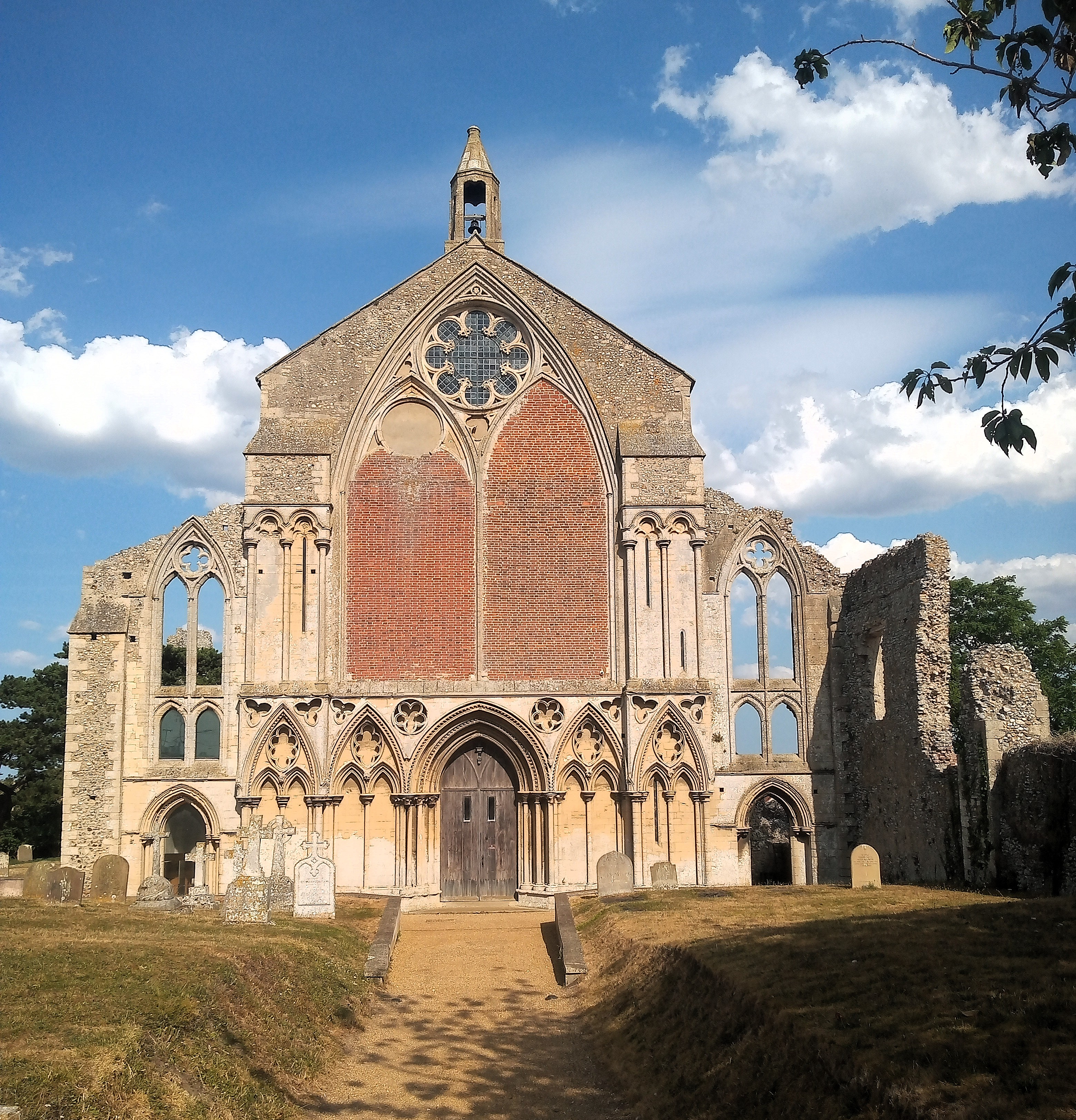
- The west end of Binham Priory in 2026
- Interactive map of Binham Priory
- Location: Binham, Norfolk, England

Site notes
- Public access: Yes (English Heritage)
- Website: binhampriory.org
St. Mary and the Holy Cross
- Denomination: Church of England
History
- Status: Parish church
Architecture
- Functional status: Active
- Heritage designation: Grade I listed
- Architectural type: Norman; Perpendicular; Early English
Administration
- Province: Canterbury
- Diocese: Norwich
- Parish: Binham

St Mary's Priory, Binham, or Binham Priory, is a ruined Benedictine priory located in the village of Binham in the English county of Norfolk.

The nave of the priory church is the Church of St. Mary and the Holy Cross, which is used as a place of worship. The remains of the priory are in the care of English Heritage. According to English Heritage, Binham Priory's "history is one of almost continuous scandal." Many of its priors proved to be unscrupulous and irresponsible.

== History ==
=== Foundation ===
Binham Priory was founded in 1091 as a cell of St Albans Abbey at the behest of Peter de Valognes and his wife Albreda. Peter was granted the manor of Binham after the Norman Conquest. The priory at Binham appears to have been endowed in 1104, and building work was completed about 150 years later, during the middle decades of the 13th century. The priory was obliged to pay one silver mark to its parent monastery on St Alban's Day. The abbot of St Alban's Abbey was permitted to stay at the priory for eight days, and the priory had to have a minimum of eight monks.

=== 13th, 14th and 15th centuries ===
In 1212, Binham Priory was besieged by Robert Fitzwalter over an argument between Fitzwalter and the Abbey of St. Albans. The siege was lifted by the forces of King John. In 1285, King Edward I visited the priory.

In 1381, the records of the priory were burned during the Great Revolt. This action was led by a local man, John Lister, who was an organiser of the rebellion in Norfolk. The British Museum hold a cartulary for the priory that can be dated to the 14th century. The number of monks residing at the priory increased to 13 or 14 during the 14th century, before falling back to six individuals immediately before the suppression of the priory in 1539.

A ley tunnel is said to run from the buildings to an unknown destination, and it is reported that many years ago a fiddler decided to explore these passages; he could be heard for some distance before suddenly ceasing. The fiddler was never seen again.

=== Suppression and later destruction ===
Sir Robert Rich, (Note: Also referred to as Sir Robert Ryche.) a Visitor of Religious Houses and Chancellor of the Court of Augmentations, visited the priory on 29 March 1538. In a letter to Thomas Cromwell, he wrote:

My lord, I intend to suppress Bynham before my return, which pretendyth itself to be a Sell to Seynt Albans, yf ye advertyse me not to the contrary. I have fynes and other matters of record levyed by them not namyng the Abbot of Seynt Albanys; also contynually they make leases under their owne seale, not namyng the Abbott.

Shortly afterwards, the priory was suppressed. On 20 May 1538, the prior, Thomas Williams, was awarded an annual pension of £4. In 1539, most of the priory was destroyed under the orders of Henry VIII. There were at this time only six monks remaining; the priory was estimated to be worth £150.

In February 1539, John Mynne was given a lease of the rectorial tithes of Binham for 21 years at a rent of 20 marks. Mynne was secretary to the Norfolk Commissioners who compiled the Valor Ecclesiasticus for the king, two of whom were Sir Christopher Jenny and Sir Roger Townshend. In April 1539 Jenny wrote to Cromwell that he was comforted by Cromwell’s promise to obtain for him the farm of Binham from the king, not realising that the farm—which included the priory precinct and all the buildings within it—had been let to Townshend the previous month.

On 14 September 1539, the priory was awarded by the king to a local nobleman, Sir Thomas Paston. In total, Paston was given "the Manor of Binham, the site of the Priory and the Rectories of Binham, Barney, and Dersingham and the Manors of Great Walsingham, Gunthorpe, Ryburgh, and Wells and certain revenues from churches formerly belonging to the Priory". Paston used the priory buildings to provide stone for his house in Wells.

The priory buildings were demolished still further by Sir Thomas Paston's son Edward, who planned to build a new house in Binham but eventually gave up on the project. According to the English antiquary Sir Henry Spelman, "Mr. Edward Paston many years since was desirous to build a mansion house upon or near the Priory of Binham and attempting for that purpose to clear some of the ground, a piece of wall fell upon a workman and slew him. Perplexed with this accident in the beginning of this business, he gave it wholly over and would by no means all his life after be persuaded to re-attempt upon it, but built his mansion house, a very fair one, at Appleton.”

== Description of the priory buildings ==
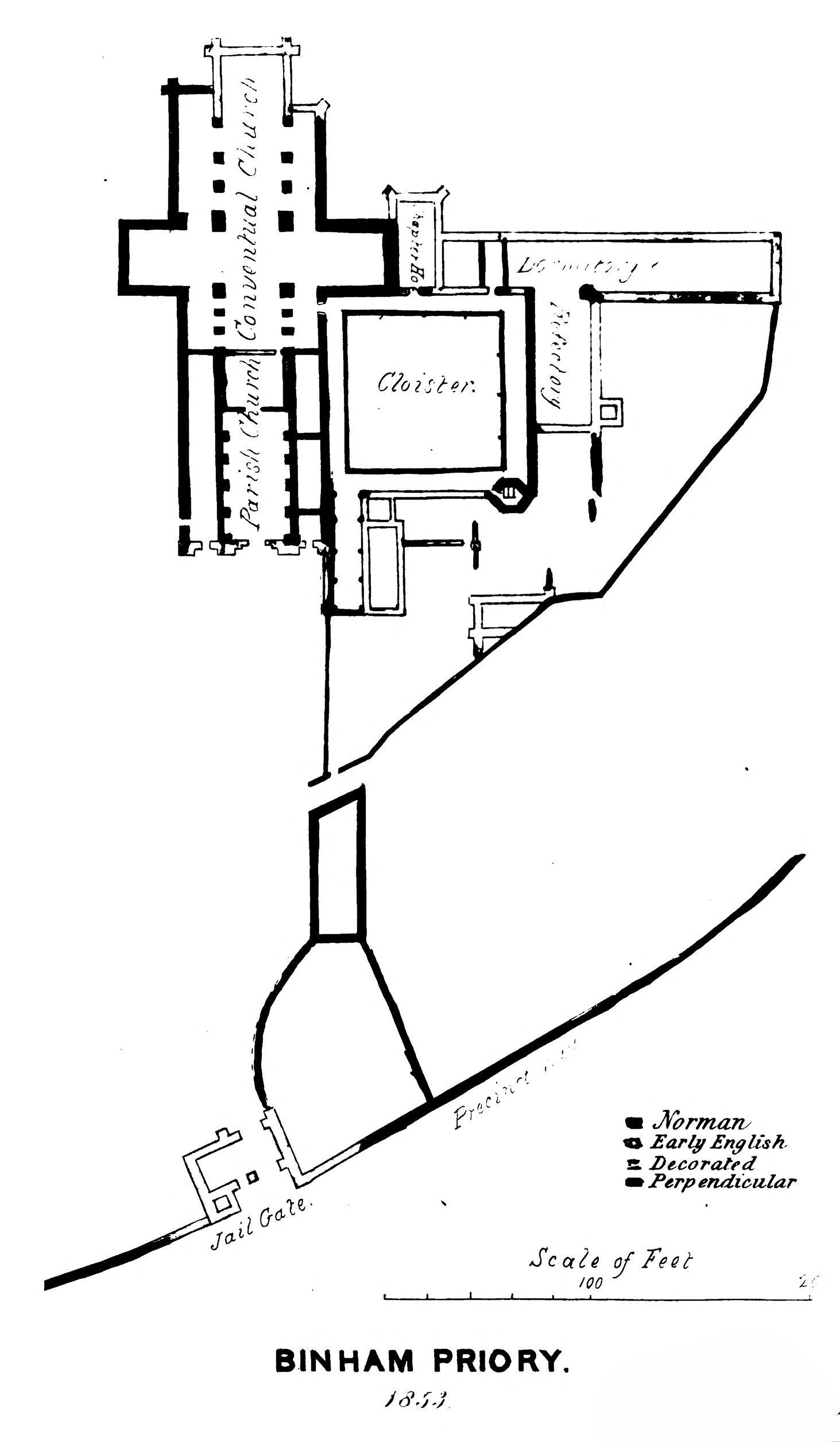
Henry Harrod's plan of the priory (1857)

With the exception of the western part of the priory church, the buildings at Binham Priory were destroyed after the Reformation. The Grade I listed ruins (which include the gatehouse) are under the protection of English Heritage. The ruins form an almost complete example of an English monastic precinct.

=== The priory church ===
The part of the original priory church that has survived is 73 metres (240 ft) long. Because it was built at a time of transition from the Romanesque to the Gothic styles, the church has a mixture of architectural styles. The extant building is used as Binham's parish church. The priory was dedicated to St Mary and the church to the Holy Cross; the current building is dedicated to both St Mary and the Holy Cross.

==== Nave ====
For a long period of time, the nave remained unfinished, with the upper storey being completed last of all. The boundary between the Norman and Early English Gothic styles runs diagonally down the building. On the gallery floor there are two Early English bays on the north side; three of the bays are Early English on the level above. The east wall of the nave contains two original doorways, and represents the pulpitum (the screen that divided the nave from the choir). Above the arcade in the nave was a gallery that was not subdivided. The original nave and the two aisles that ran on either side had 9 bays. The interior of the nave is Norman, with rounded arches set between double shafts. The original pulpit was at the present east end.

All but two of the bays were used as the medieval parish church, which was separated from the monastic end of the church by stone and timber screens, parts of which are still visible.

In creating the 16th-century parish church, the arches of the arcades that separated the nave from the aisles, and the doorways to the eastern end of the church, were blocked, and an east wall was built to replace the rood screen.

==== West front ====
According to the church historian Matthew Champion, the west front is “a work of superb quality, equal to the very best mason's work being undertaken anywhere in England at that time”. The lower level of the west front corresponds architecturally to the lower arcades of the inside of the nave. According to a chronicle written by Matthew Paris, a monk based at St Albans, the west front was built in about 1245 when Richard de Parco was prior. On either side of the central door are two Blind arcades, with quatrefoils, and more complex foils in the stonework. The arches are surrounded by mouldings and are supported on columns with capitals. The doorway's capitals have a crocket design, carved from a single stone. The mouldings and middle door are carved with a dog-tooth design. The west front windows consist of a central window which was bricked up in 1809, and the two aisle windows on either side.

==== Great West Window ====
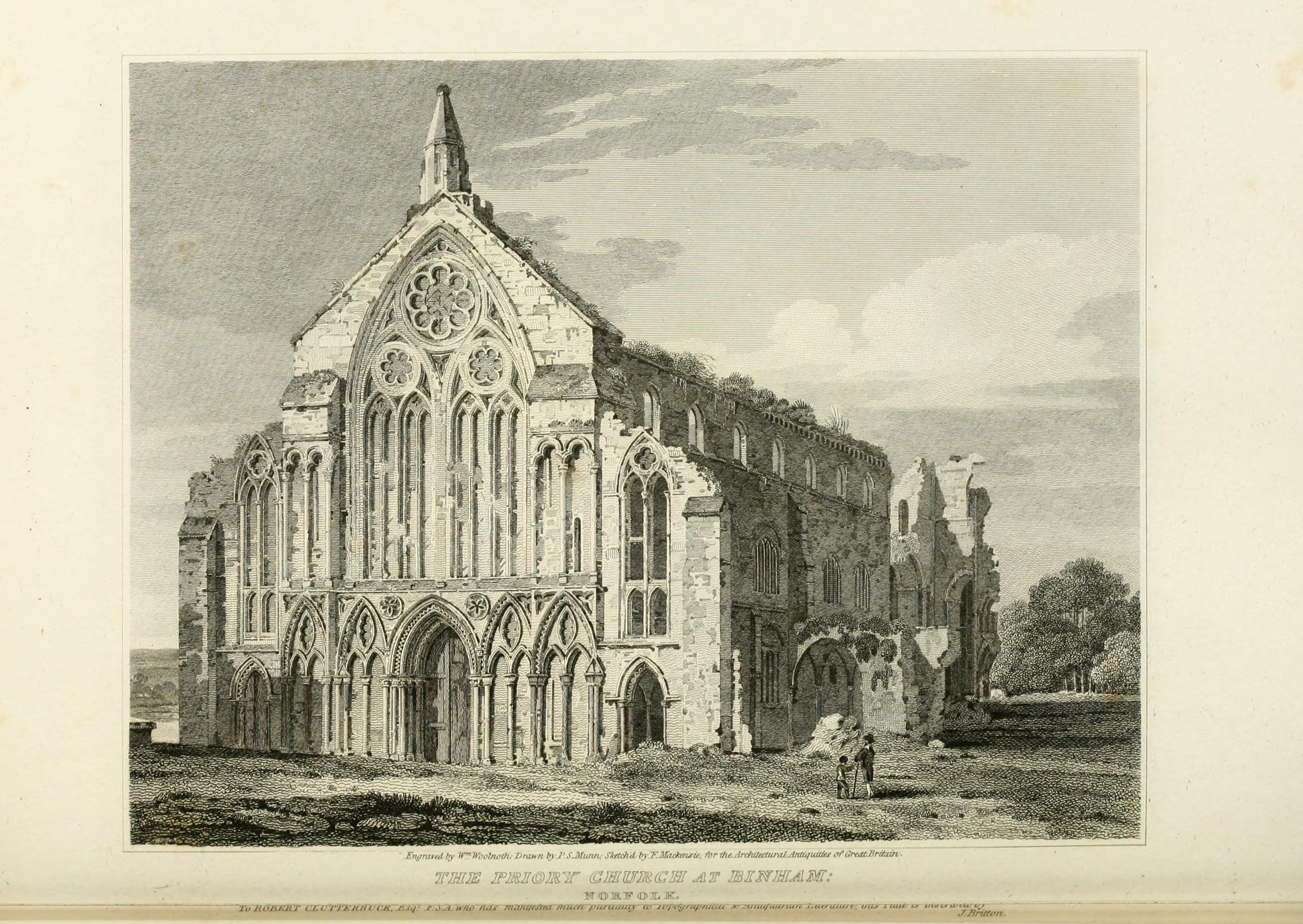
William Woolnoth, The Priory Church at Binham, Norfolk (1807)

The windows of the west front and the north aisle were both bricked up between 1738 and c. 1780.

The west front at Binham Priory has the earliest example in England of gothic bar tracery. Bar tracery was first used in the chancel of Reims Cathedral, which was begun in 1211 and consecrated in 1241. Other early examples of bar tracery in England at Windsor Castle and Lincoln Cathedral are lost. The tracery at Westminster Abbey survives; it is more elaborate and more comprehensive than at Binham, but the surviving tracery at Binham pre-dates the stonework at Westminster Abbey by a decade. (Note: In bar tracery the stone framework of the window is made of fitted pieces of stone, rather than from whole pieces. Bar tracery made it possible to incorporate into a church extensive areas of glass characteristic of Gothic architecture, and make the stonework finely patterned.)

Until 2010, it was unclear as to whether the west window had four or eight lights (the spaces between the stone mullions that make up the tracery pattern). If the window had eight lights, it can be regarded as a revolutionary development in English window design. Survey work in 2010 revealed the presence of inscriptions on the church pillars, with five found around the western end of the nave. The inscriptions were dateable as they were produced on 12th-century stonework that had been painted over during the late 13th or early 14th century. The best surviving of the inscriptions showed part of the design for the west window, and was possibly created in c. 1245 by the mason. The design suggested that the original window had eight lights.

=== Remains of the east end of the church ===
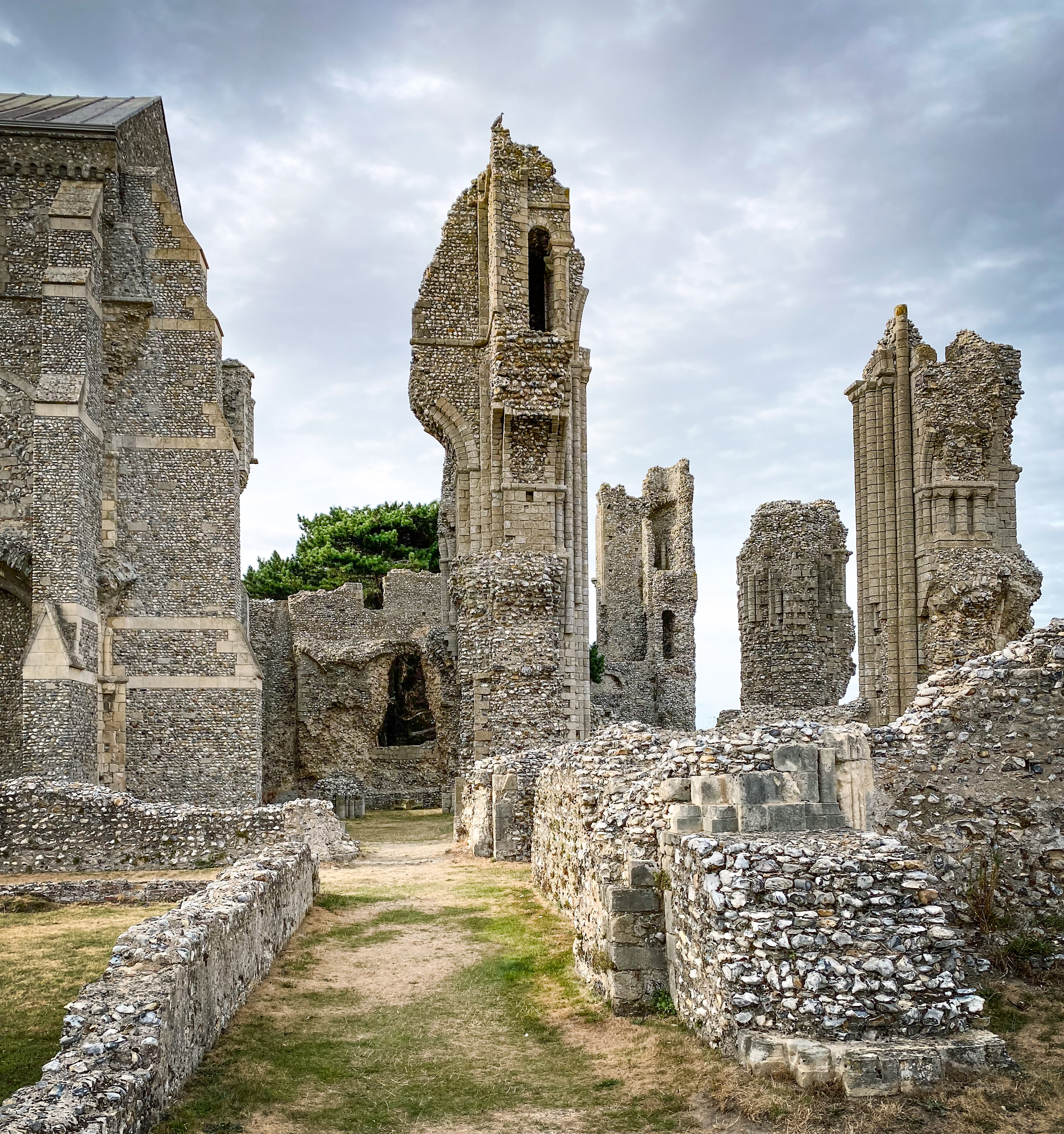
Part of the ruins of the priory

The layout of the ruined eastern end of the priory church can be deciphered from the remains, which are low-lying apart from the crossing piers and parts of the transepts.

The original plan for the chancel, built in c. 1100, was symmetrical. It extended for two bays, flanked by 3-metre-wide (9.8 ft) aisles and an chapel in each of the transepts. The chancel was lengthened during the Perpendicular Gothic period, when the aisles and chancel were provided with square ends.

The base of an apse off the south transept is visible. The central crossing and the two easternmost bays of the nave contained the monks' choir. Four piers that supported the central tower stand to a height of up to 14 metres (46 ft); they retain much of the original ashlar facing. The transepts show both some of the original features as well as evidence of alteration, including the demolition of the apses. In the south transept, the surviving walls include recesses for tombs and the base of a staircase. Parts of the north transept walls survive almost the full original height. Within the walls are remains of stairs.

Parts of the aisles on either side of the nave survive to a maximum height of 1.3 metres (4 ft 3 in), but soil has built up against the outer north aisle wall, so that only the tops of the external buttresses are visible above it. The north aisle was largely intact until the early 19th century. Two of its eastern bays were probably used as a sacristy. A hearth with a chimney, built into a blocked-up window, was perhaps used the monks to bake wafers. A small sunken chamber between the piers of the arcade opposite was possibly a strong room. The south aisle was a later date subdivided by walls; two of these were used to create a late medieval chapel.

The whole of the east end of the church was demolished in 1540.

=== Other features of the precinct ===
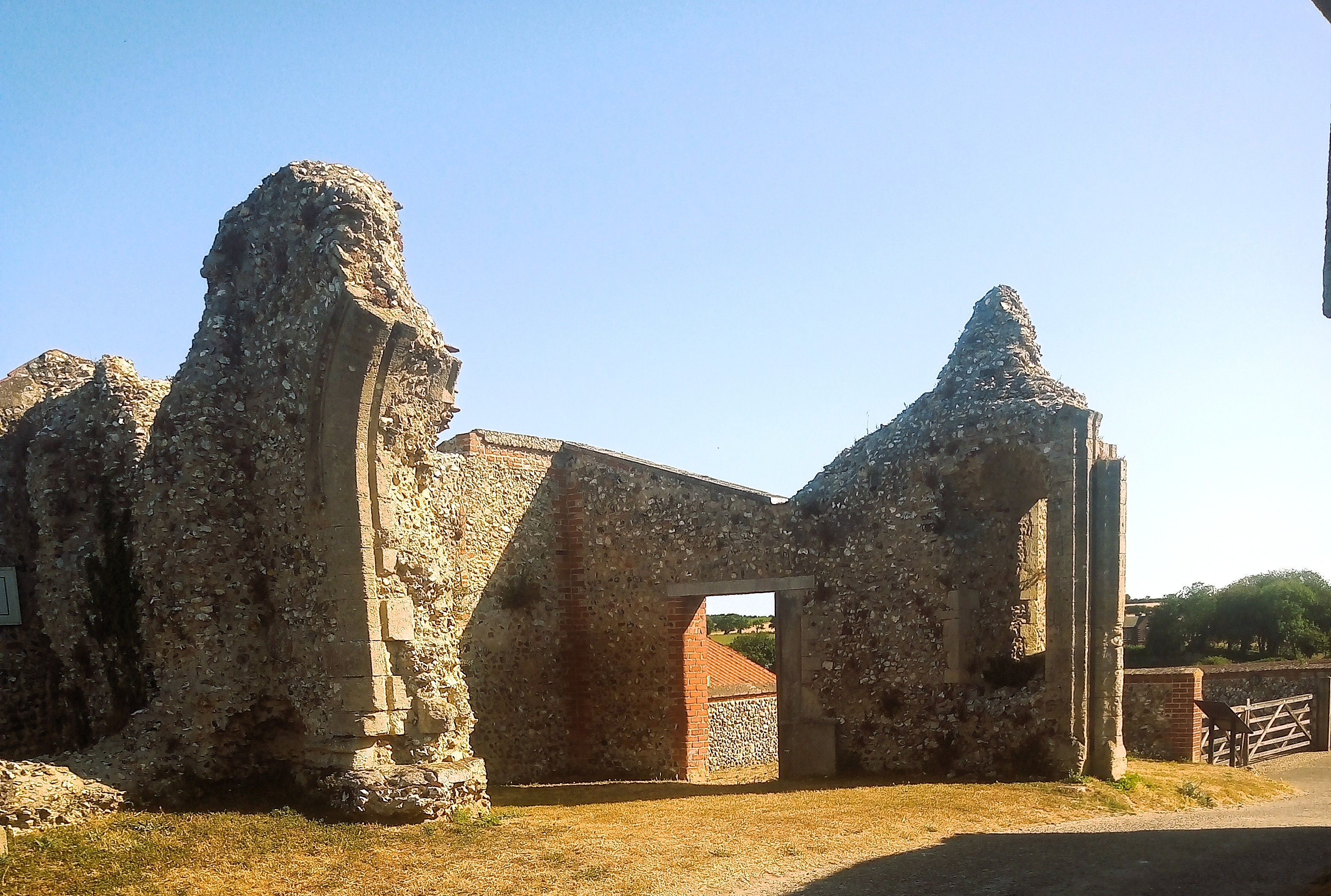
The ruins of the priory gatehouse

Within the precinct of Binham Priory are the possible remains of guest accommodation, farm buildings, a water management system, a water mill, and the remains of fish ponds. The previously lost western side of the medieval wall of the precinct was located in August 2007.

The gatehouse dates from the 15th century.

Having bought the gatehouse and precinct wall were bought in 2002, Norfolk Archaeological Trust began repairs to both features in 2008. In 2009, the previously ruined north aisle was used as the site for a new structure designed to improve access to the surviving building, and install interpretation and display space, a kitchen and a toilet A sloping path was constructed to improve accessibility into the church.

== Excavations ==
During the 1920s and 1930s the Office of Works acquired castles and monasteries that were subsequently protected and opened to the public. Norfolk Archaeological Trust raised the funds required for the site at Binham to be purchased before passing guardianship of the Office of Works in October 1933. Henry Neville supervised the clearance of debris from the newly-revealed cloisters, and the east end of the site from 1934 to 1938, with the work being completed prior to the start of World War Two. The work done during this period also revealed the existence of included the chapter house, the monks’ parlour, the warming room, and an upstairs dormitory, toilets, the refectory, kitchens, storerooms, and accommodation.

The 1930s excavation work did not match current standards; much valuable archaeology was lost when rubble was removed to expose the original plan of the priory.

Further excavations within the priory precinct were undertaken in 1964, 1996, 2005, 2007, 2008, and 2016.

== Notable people associated with the priory ==
=== Priors ===
Data from the Binham Priory website.

Date	Name of prior
1106	Osgod
after 1121–before 1135	Robert
c. 1133 – c. 1143/6	Enisandus
recorded 1189,1193, and 1197	Peter
recorded 1189	Ralph Gubion
recorded 1199–1207	Thomas
recorded 1214, 1220	Richard le Rus
	Richard de Kancia
	Miles
	William de Gedding
1227 (resigned 1244)	Richard de Parco
recorded 1244	Richard de Selford
recorded 1262	William
recorded 1264, 1267	Adam de Motu
	Milo
	Peter
recorded 1279, 1289	Robert de Waltham
recorded 1296	Walter
1317	William de Somerton
1323	Nicholas de Flamstede
1326	William de Somerton
1337	John de Caldewell
recorded 1354	Adam
recorded 1396	Robert Stoke
1425	Michael Cheyne
1430	William Bryt
1436	William Spygon
1438	Nicholas Wellys
1454	Henry Halstead
1461	William Dixwell
1464	John Peyton
1465–1476	William Dixwell
1480	Richard Whitingdon
1481	Thomas Sudbury
1485	William Fresell
1509	John Albon
1539	Thomas Williams

=== Other people ===
- Reginald de Warenne
- Simon Binham

=== Notable burials ===
- Peter de Valognes and his wife Albreda de Saint-Saveur
- Roger de Valognes (their son) and his wife Agnes FitzJohn

== In art ==
According to the antiquary Francis Blomefield, the English printmaker Samuel Buck produced an engraving of the priory in 1738.

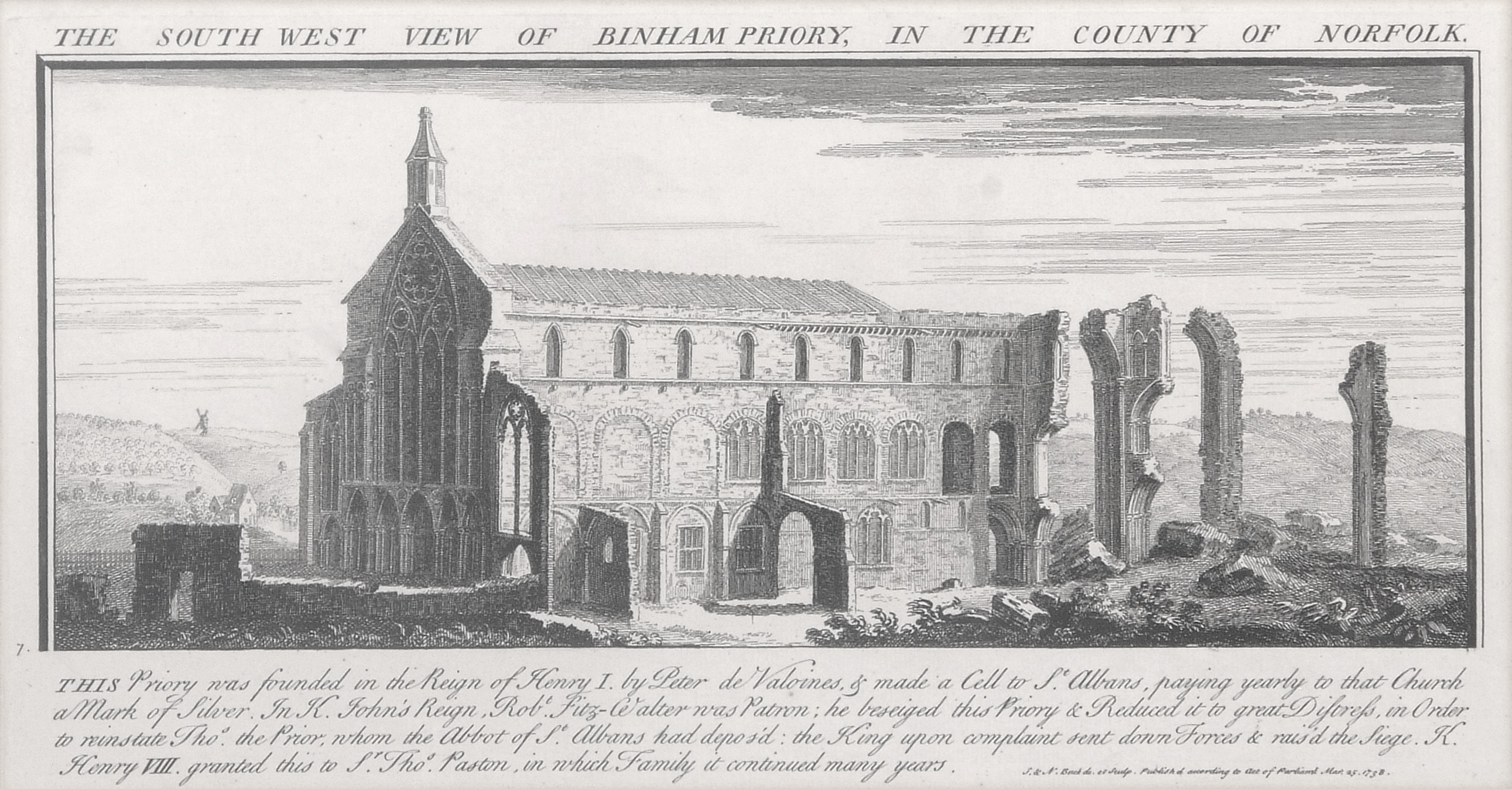
Nathaniel Buck - The South West View of Binham Priory, in the County of Norfolk (1738)

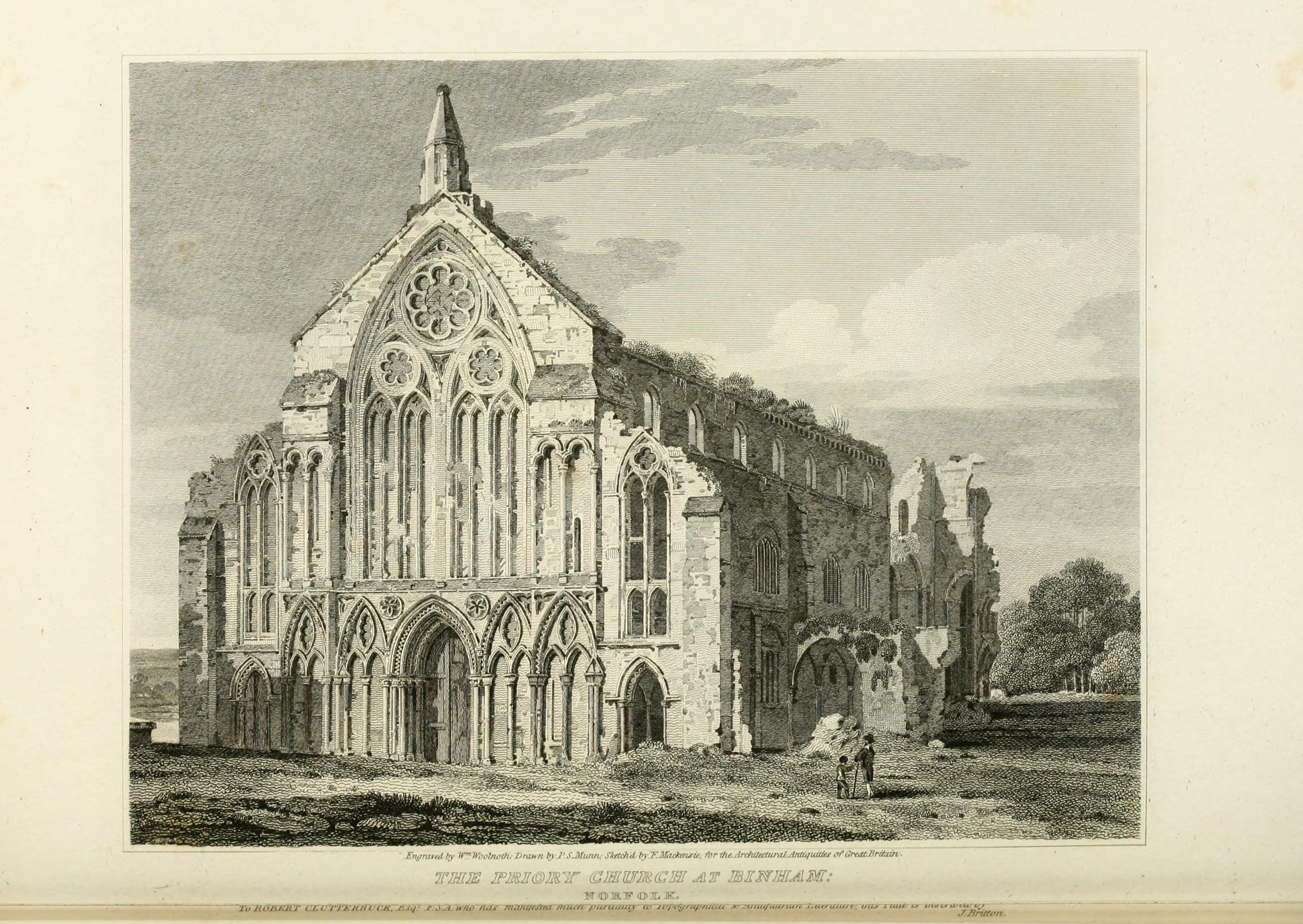
William Woolnoth - The Priory Church at Binham, Norfolk (1807)

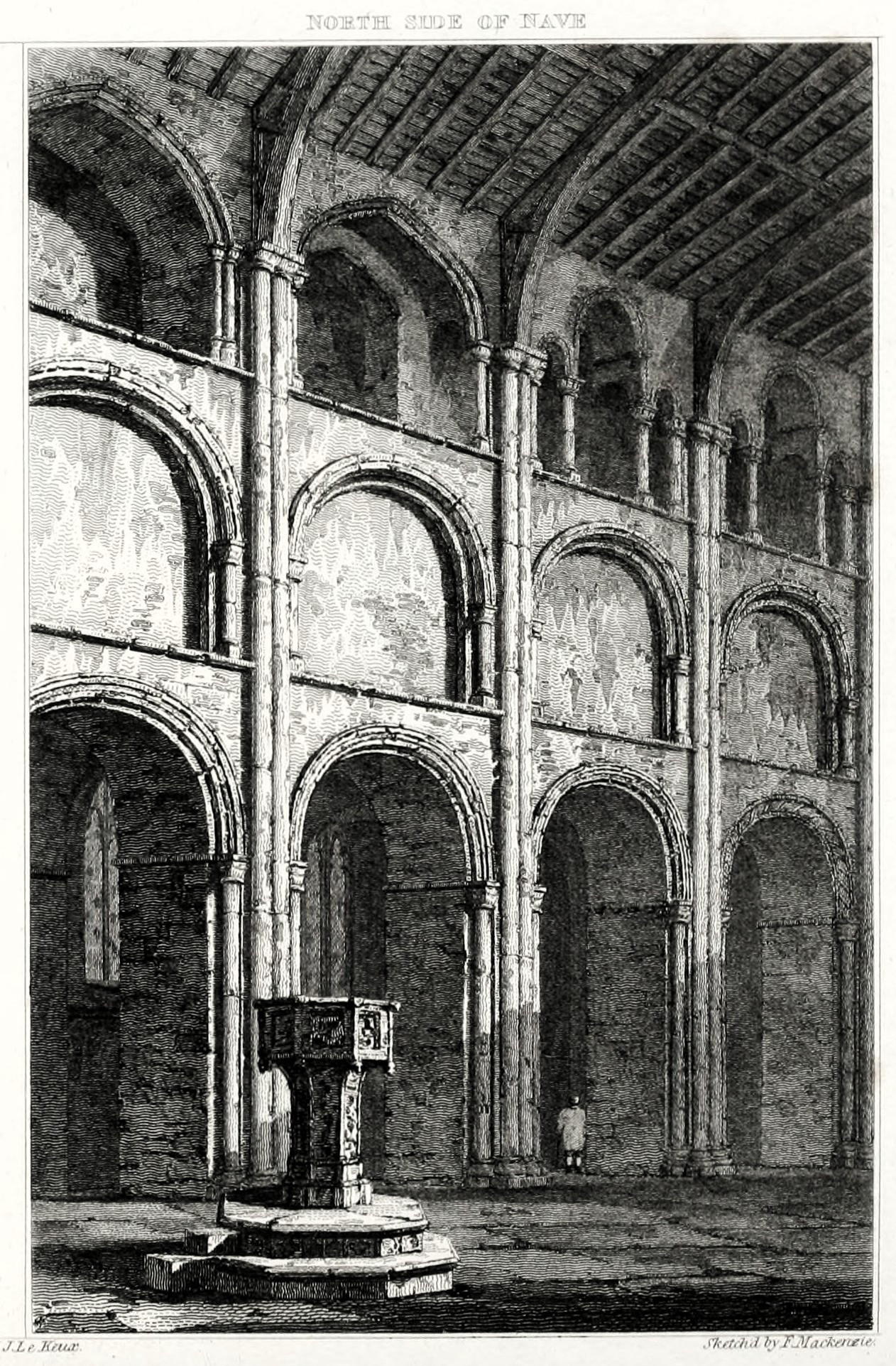
F. Mackenzie - The Priory Church at Binham, Norfolk, interior (1807)

== Use as a parish church ==
The surviving western half of the priory church is in use as the parish church for the parish of Binham.

== See also ==
- List of English abbeys, priories and friaries serving as parish churches

== Sources ==
- Britton, John (1807). The Architectural Antiquities of Great Britain. Vol. 3. London: Longman, Hurst, Rees, and Orme. OCLC 1039946821.
- Burstall, F. Byron (1949). "The Pastons and their Manor of Binham". Norfolk Archaeology. 30 (1): 101–129.
- Butler, Lionel Harry (1979). Medieval Monasteries of Great Britain. London: Joseph. ISBN 0718116143.
- Champion, Matthew J. (2011). "Tracery Designs at Binham Priory". English Heritage Historical Review. 6: 6–21. doi:10.1179/1752016912Z.0000000001.
- Champion, M. (2015). Medieval Graffiti: The Lost Voices of England's Churches. Random House. ISBN 978-0-09-196041-4.
- Douglas, David Charles (1974). The Social Structure of Medieval East Anglia. Oxford Studies in Sicial and Legal History. New York: Octagon Books. OCLC 987960845.
- Le Strange, Richard (1973). Monasteries of Norfolk. King's Lynn, UK: Yates.
- Pevsner, Nikolaus (1962). North-East Norfolk and Norwich. London: Penguin Books.
- Wade-Martins, Peter (2017). A Life in Norfolk's Archaeology: 1950-2016 Archaeology in an Arable Landscape (PDF). Archaeopress Publishing Limited. ISBN 9781784916589.
- Westwood, Jennifer (1985). Albion: A Guide to Legendary Britain. London: Grafton Books. ISBN 978-0-246-11789-2.
