= Woolcott =

Woolcott or Woollcott may refer to:

== People ==
- Alexander Woollcott (1887–1943), American critic and commentator
- Peter Woolcott (born 1953), Australian public servant
- Richard Woolcott (1927–2023), Australian diplomat, author and commentator
- Roy Woolcott (1946–2018), English professional footballer
- Sina Woolcott (1907–2003), New Zealand potter, born in Fiji
- William W. Woollcott (1876–1949), American businessman

== Other uses ==
- Woolcott, Bracken County, Kentucky

== See also ==
- Walcot (disambiguation)
- Walcott (disambiguation)
- Wilcot
- Wolcott (disambiguation)
- Wolgot
- Woolscott
