= Ostende =

Ostende may refer to:

- Ostend, Belgium, (French: Ostende), in Dutch Oostende
- Ostende, Buenos Aires, a resort town in Pinamar Partido, Argentina
- Ostende, a hamlet in the Quarter Ende of Herdecke, Germany
- Breitenfurt-Ostende, a hamlet in Breitenfurt bei Wien, Austria
- Playa de Ostende, a beach in Castro-Urdiales, Spain; see Punta de los Cuervos

== Other uses ==
- Ostende, a 2011 Argentine film directed by Laura Citarella
- Ostend–Vienna Express, a train that ran on the Cologne–Aachen high-speed railway from 1894 to 1993

== See also ==
- Ostend (disambiguation)
- Oostende (disambiguation)
- Oosteinde, a village in North Holland
- Oosterend, North Holland
