= Walcott =

Walcott may refer to:

== People ==
- Walcott (surname)

== Places ==
=== England ===
- Walcott, Lincolnshire
- Walcott, Norfolk

=== United States ===
- Walcott, Arkansas
- Walcott, Iowa
- Walcott, North Dakota
- Walcott, Wyoming
- Walcott Township, Rice County, Minnesota

== See also ==
- Walcot, Lincolnshire
- de Walcott family
- Walcot (disambiguation)
- Wolcott (disambiguation)
- Walcote (disambiguation)
- "Walcott", a song by Vampire Weekend from their 2008 self-titled album
