= De Walcott family =

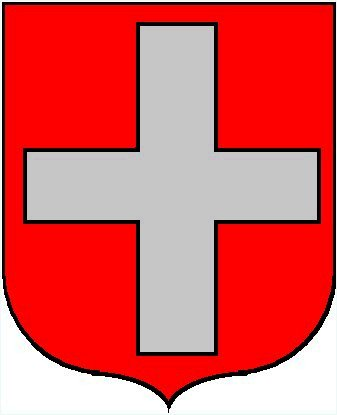
Possible de Walcott coat of arms The reference to this coat of arms is unclear and could refer to either the Walcott family or the Rose family (as noted in Walcott church)

The de Walcott family were Lords of the Manor of Walcott England from the late 12th century until the late 14th century.

This article is adapted from The Historic Happing Website with permission.

== Manor houses ==
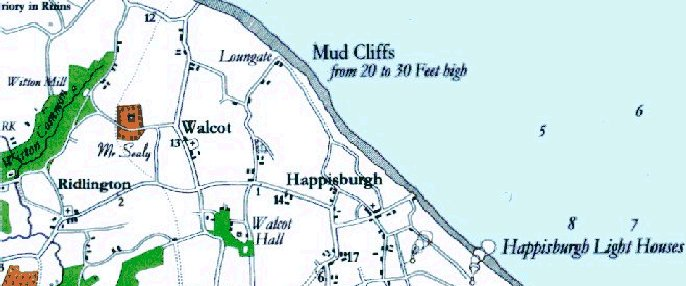
Extract showing Walcott from William Faden's 1797 map of Norfolk

Originally there were two Halls in Walcott, East Hall and West Hall. William Faden's map of Norfolk dated 1797 shows Walcott Hall but unfortunately, it is not entirely clear if this is West or East Hall. However, between 1386 & 1486, there is note of a manor called 'Masons' in Walcott.

== Chronology ==
The de Walcott family is first noted in East Hall in Walcott during the reign of Henry II (1154 to 1189) when William de Edgefield was living when his mother, Maud de Walcott who granted two parts of the tithe of her lands in Walcott to the monks of Bromholm Priory in Bacton.

Peter de Edgefield, father of William and his wife (Hawise) had a daughter (Letitia) who married Sir William de Rosceline and brought this manor into that family.

In 1240 and possibly 1281, Thomas de Walcott held part of the advowson (income) of Walcott church and was lord of West Hall in Walcott.

In 1286, Peter de Rosceline claimed wreck at sea and frankpledge, he and his wife were living in 1316. Their son, Sir Thomas de Roseceline inherited the manor afterwards.

In 1286, Sir Walter de Walcott held a moiety in Hempstead and was patron of Wallington in 1302. Walter was married to Lucia.

In 1286, Alexander de Walcott, son of Walter de Walcott, and his brother Thomas had 16 messuages, 120 acres (0.49 km^{2}) of land, 12 acres (49,000 m^{2}) of pasture, 31 acres (130,000 m^{2}) of wood in Eccles, Hempstead, Palling and Stalham.

Alexander de Walcott was lord of West Hall in 1302, a lord in Walcott in 1315, and in 1316 he and his wife (Maud) held West Hall.

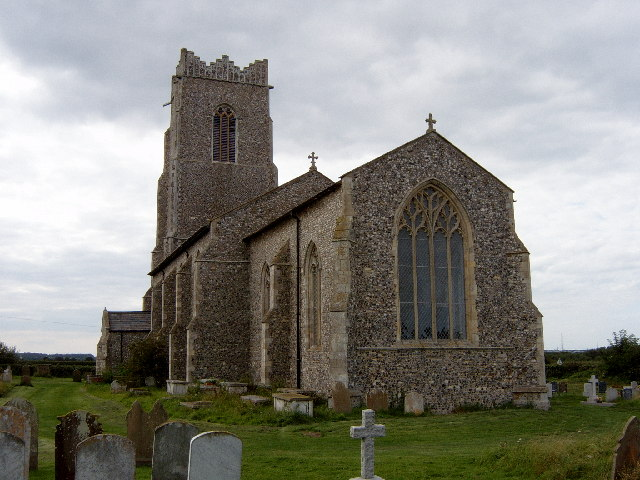
All Saints, Walcott

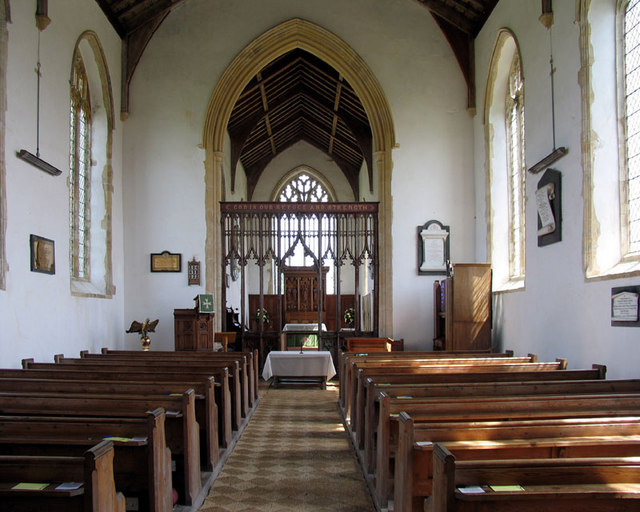
The interior of All Saints, Walcott showing the eastern end

Alexander de Walcott presented his brother Hugh as Rector of Walcott church in 1302 and presented John de Walcott as Rector of Walcott church in 1322.

There is confusion about whom Alexander de Walcott married. Francis Bloomfield states that in 1333 he was married to Joan and paid 15 marks to the King for an interest in Hempstead. However, he is also noted as being married to Maud and had four daughters called Cecilia, Elizabeth, Mariota, and Margaret. Possibly, he was married twice.

In 1340, Alexander de Walcott conveyed his right in West Hall in Walcott to Sir Walter de Walcott [A], his son Alexander de Walcott died in 1341.

Sir Walter de Walcott was a lord in Walcott in 1347 and in 1355 he presented to Walcott church.

In 1347, Simon de Walcott was presented to Walcott church by Thomas de Walcott, Rector of Felbrigg.

Walter married Millicent, daughter and heir of Walter de Gunton and held the manor of Gunton. Walter and Millicent had three daughters – one was Margaret, who married Thomas de Wymondham – and a son, also called Walter [B].

Sir Walter de Walcott died in 1355.

Sir Walter [B] de Walcott died in 1366. He was married to Joan, daughter of Walter de Clopton. Walter and Joan had four daughters: Elizabeth who married Ralph Bray of Wickhampton; Catherine who married John Durward; Margery a nun of Carrow Priory in Norwich; and Margaret who married Sir Robert Berney of Wickhampton and had the manor of Gunton.

There was a Sir Alexander de Walcott living around 1377, although what relation he was to the above is unknown. Walter Rye states that he was not the brother of Sir Walter de Walcott. Alexander probably married a daughter from the Westingthorpe family and had a daughter who married Andrew Brampton plus a son. This son had a son called John de Walcott of Wallington who had a daughter called Isabel who married Robert Brampton.

The last note of the family in Walcott was in 1377 with Sir Alexander de Walcott.

In 1378, William le Parker sold the manor of Brumstead and the manor of Eccles to Simon de Walcote, Rector of Walcote.
