= Walcott, Norfolk =

Village in Norfolk, England

Coordinates: 52.840°N 1.503°E

Walcott
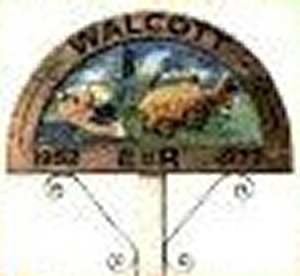
- Walcott village sign

- Location within Norfolk
- Population: 548 (Including Ostend 2011)
- OS grid reference: TG360320
  - London: 137 miles (220 km)
- Civil parish: Walcott CP
- District: North Norfolk
- Shire county: Norfolk
- Region: East
- Country: England
- Sovereign state: United Kingdom
- Post town: NORWICH
- Postcode district: NR12
- Dialling code: 01692
- Police: Norfolk
- Fire: Norfolk
- Ambulance: East of England
- UK Parliament: North Norfolk

Walcott is a small village and civil parish on the North Norfolk coast in England between Mundesley and Happisburgh. The name is formed from the Anglian word 'walh' (cognate with 'Welsh') and the Anglo-Saxon 'cot' meaning 'cottage, hut, shelter or den'. The village is 19.1 miles (30.7 km) north east of Norwich, 11.9 miles (19.2 km) south east of Cromer and 137 miles (220 km) north east of London. The village lies 5.6 miles (9.0 km) east of the town of North Walsham.

The village is the only point where the B1159 (the coast road) actually runs along the edge of the sea. This makes it a popular stopping off point for day-trippers and storm watchers.

The parish was created in 2008, partitioned from the Happisburgh parish.

== History ==
(Note: This section is adapted from The Historic Happing Website with permission. See commons:Commons:OTRS Ticket#2008091010035136)

=== Geology, geography and climate ===
The geology and geography in the vicinity of Walcott have been shaped by past ice ages, sea incursions and rivers that have deposited material over the underlying chalk.

The last ice sheet left Norfolk around 16,000 BC allowing pine trees to colonise the region.

Between 10,000 – 6000 BC the climate became warm and dry allowing alder, oak, elm & lime into the region.

The increasing temperature caused the sea level to rise and around 5000 BC the North Sea was first connected to the English Channel via a narrow strait. Eventually there were wide inter-tidal estuaries around Norfolk, which started to deposit marine clay over the original peat in the Broadland area.

Around 3000 BC the Norfolk coastline was roughly similar to today's outline, although the local cliffs continued to erode. Some of the eroded material goes to form the sand bar, a few miles (kilometres) offshore, that runs parallel with the coastline and is a danger to local shipping.

During the Bronze Age (2,500 – 800 BC) the climate slowly became cooler although the sea level continued to rise and around 750 BC the sea started to breach the spits across the estuaries further south. This resulted in Walcott becoming part of a large peninsula with numerous islands and waterways in the south and east. This peninsula would have made an ideal area for man to colonise with fresh water, fishing and reeds (for thatch) in the west, sea fishing in the east. The good farming land and its isolation would have offered some degree of defence.

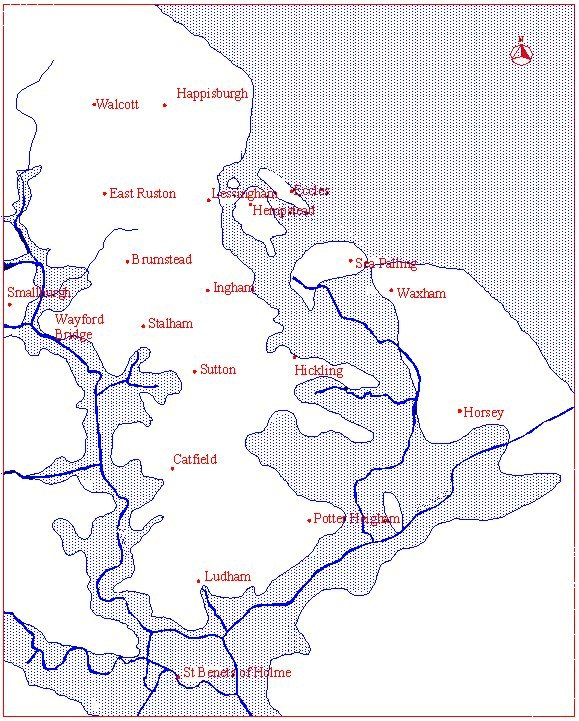
The sea level in the Roman period (+1 metre; 3' approximate).

From the Iron Age to the end of the Roman period (800 BC – 410 AD) the climate became wet and cold and locally the sea level probably reached about 1 metre (3.3 ft) above today's average.

Around 500 AD (during the Anglo-Saxon period) spits of land further south started once again to exclude the sea from the local estuaries and the inlets forming the peninsular began to 'dry out'. These natural barriers have subsequently been maintained by man to protect the farmland behind.

The coastal erosion in the vicinity has been estimated at an approximate rate of 1 metre (3.3 ft) per year and accounts for the loss of an approximate 1 1/4 miles (2.0 km) wide strip of land since the Roman invasion of AD 43 as a result of which several medieval villages (e.g. Waxham Parva, Markesthorpe) disappeared into the sea.

Note: Details of the past vegetation and climate of the region have been determined from borehole logs (and pollen analysis) such as that at Ranworth Broad.

=== Prehistoric ===
The climate was very different during the Palaeolithic or Old Stone Age Era (pre 10,000 BC) as shown by the bones of elephants, rhinoceros, hippopotamus, hyena, etc. found in East Anglia. However, it is considered that only intermittent human occupation occurred at this time. The majority of the artefacts recorded in the vicinity of Walcott from this period were flint hand axes, which suggests forest clearance.

Little activity is noted in the vicinity during the Mesolithic or Middle Stone Age Era (10,000 – 5000 BC) with few artefacts recorded.

During the Neolithic or New Stone Age Era (5000 – 2500 BC) the majority of the artefacts found in the vicinity are concentrated on higher ground.

The number of Bronze Age (2500 – 800 BC) artefacts recorded in the vicinity increases significantly from the Neolithic Era and possibly suggests an increase in the population. There is no natural copper or tin ore in Norfolk so all raw materials must have been imported, probably by trading.

Fewer artefacts dating from the Iron Age (800 BC – 43 AD), compared to Bronze Age, have been recorded in the vicinity. However, this could just reflect the fact that iron deteriorates faster than bronze. Certainly more Iron Age pottery has been recorded in the vicinity than Bronze Age pottery.

The Norfolk Iron Age tribe were called the Iceni and probably consisted of a group of smaller tribes, as in 54 BC Julius Caesar describes them as the Cenimagni – the Greater Iceni. It is possible that east Norfolk (including Walcott) may have been occupied by one of these smaller (possibly poorer) tribes, which could explain the general lack of finds. Some historians consider that the west side of Norfolk was settled before the east side and that society underwent a progressive fragmentation during the Iron Age until around 60 BC when larger groups started to emerge.

=== Roman ===
The number of artefacts recorded in the vicinity increases significantly during the Roman occupation (43 AD – 410 AD) with a small concentration on high ground near Happisburgh and large concentrations in the Stalham/Ingham/Wayford area.

Of the datable Roman artefacts recorded in the vicinity, approximately 75% are 1st and 2nd century AD and 25% are 3rd and 4th century AD. This discrepancy may suggest a decline in Roman activity in the vicinity from around AD 200. The Roman historian Ammianus Marcellinus records barbarians harassing Britain's east coast in AD 367.

=== Early Middle Ages ===
The vicinity shows economic recession and technological regression in the post Roman period. Grave goods found from this period strongly suggest a large influx of people from the Anglian region of Schleswig in north Germany/south Denmark (the Angles), confirmed by the Venerable Bede.

During the Middle Saxon period (AD 650 – 865), the archaeological evidence in Norfolk changes (shortly after AD 700) and suggests that the region was arguably more Christian than pagan.

Late Anglo-Saxon (865–1066) artefacts recorded in the vicinity are few in number but of high quality and are indicative of high status.

Viking forces first raided East Anglia in 865 and it remained under Scandinavian control until 917 when the West Saxons re-conquered East Anglia. It is thought that this was the start of the system of Hundreds – areas of land containing approximately 100 families. Walcott is in the Happing Hundred

The cutting of peat that resulted in the formation of The Broads is thought to have started around AD 900. This practice may have been introduced by the Angles and could indicate the scarcity of firewood at the time.

=== Medieval ===
Before the Norman Conquest Walcott was held by Eadric de Laxfield. There were 4 carucates and 6 acres (about 486 acres) of (arable) land, 8 villagers and 16 smallholders. The lord had 2 ploughs and there were 2 other ploughs. There were 8 acres (3.2 ha) of meadow, 1 mill, 3 cattle, 4 pigs & 80 sheep. There was a church with 20 acres (8.1 ha). There were 7 freemen with 70 acres (28 ha) and 2 ploughs, and there were 5 other ploughs. The value of the manor was 40 shillings. South Erpingham Hundred held 3 freemen in Walcott with 90 acres (36 ha) and 3 ploughs.

Eadric was a major Thane (noble) at that time, based at Eye in Suffolk, with numerous manors and lands in Norfolk, Suffolk and Wiltshire. Whilst some historians consider him to have been Danish, as depicted on the village sign at Happisburgh, all (admittedly slender) evidence relating to his origin suggests that he was English.

Immediately after the Conquest Walcott was given to Robert Malet who died before the Domesday Survey of 1088 when it was granted to Ralph (Ranulf), brother of Iger and held by Humphrey, possibly his nephew. There were 4 carucates and 6 acres (2.4 ha) of land with 3 ploughs, 8 villagers & 16 smallholders. 2 other ploughs, 8 acres (3.2 ha) of meadow, 1 mill, 2 cobs (horses), 16 cattle, 24 pigs, 70 sheep & 4 beehives. 1 church with 20 acres (8.1 ha), 7 freemen with 70 acres (28 ha), 5 other ploughs. Another 4 freemen with 90 acres (36 ha). The value of the manor was 60s. South Erpingham Hundred held 3 freemen in Walcott with 2.5 ploughs. As only men were recorded in the survey, and assuming each man had a wife and 2.4 children, the approximate population of Walcott in 1088 was around 170.

The eponymous de Walcott family were Lords of the Manor of Walcott from about the late 12th century until about the late 14th century.

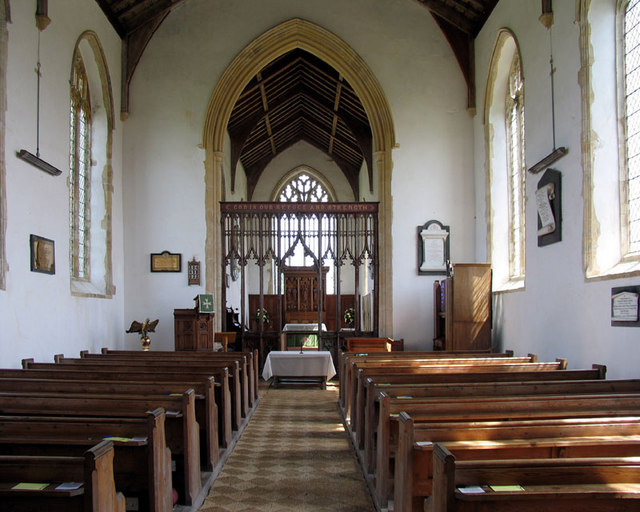
The interior of All Saints, Walcott showing the eastern end.

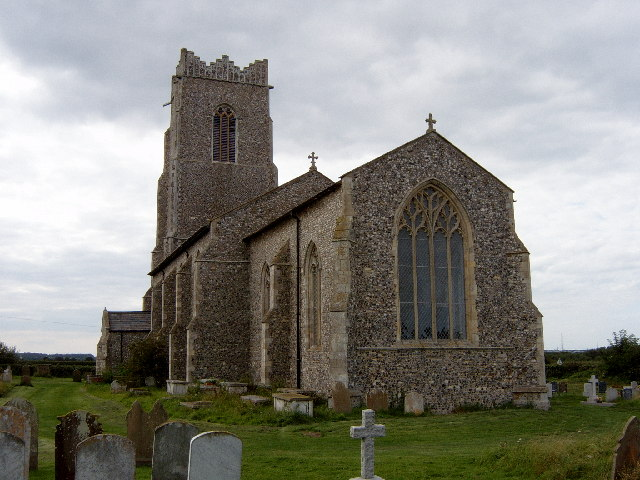
All Saints, Walcott.

The church at Walcott is dedicated to All Saints and dates from the middle 14th century. The Font is 13th century. The font stands on a Celtic limestone memorial slab and both are from an earlier church, the foundations of which may have been discovered in a nearby garden.

During the reign of King Edward I (1239–1307), the church was valued at 20 marks (£13 6s 8d) per year and the Peter pence was 20d.

Originally there were two Halls in Walcott, East Hall and West Hall. William Faden's map of Norfolk dated 1797 shows Walcott Hall but unfortunately it is not entirely clear if this is West or East Hall. However, between 1386 & 1486, there is note of a manor called 'Masons' in Walcott.

The de Engain family of Brumstead and Walcott is first noted in 1404 when Thomas de Engain married Margaret, daughter of John Ellis of Great Yarmouth. In 1405, he passed the manor of West Hall to Lord Willoughby and hence West Hall was united to East Hall in Walcott.

In 1360 the Stapleton family of Ingham established a college of Friars of the order of the Holy Trinity and St Victor to serve Ingham and Walcott. Originally it consisted of a Prior, a Sacrist (who acted as Vicar and lived above the porch) and two brethren. The church is dedicated to the Holy Trinity and was rebuilt in 1360, the Chancel dates from the 1340s and the Font is 13th century. There is a monument to Sir Oliver de Ingham and Lord & Lady de Boys, there was a brass of Sir Miles Stapleton and his wife.

To help pay for a crusade in the Holy Land, in 1254 a special tax was introduced called the Norwich Tax. For Walcott the figures were 25 marks (£16 13s 4d) (the Prior of Bromholm's portion was £1 0s 0d).

Between 1250 and 1350, manorial accounts from Lessingham suggest that the main agriculture in the vicinity was about 50% Barley, 20% Legumes, 15% Wheat and the remaining 15% was Rye, Oats and mixed grain. Livestock consisted of about 55% cattle, 30% sheep and the remaining 15% was horses, oxen and pigs.

The Nomina Villarum was a list of lords in 1316 (86) and shows that Peter Roscelyn & Alexander de Walcott held Lordships in Walcott.

To pay for another crusade in the Holy Land, an assessment of tax was made of individual parishes in 1334, which gives an idea of the comparative wealth of each parish and any changes since the Norwich Taxation of 1254. For Walcott the amount was £6 0s 0d.

The Black Death arrived in Norfolk in the spring of 1349 and spread up the river valleys from Yarmouth, suggesting that it arrived by ship and was spread by river craft. In the autumn of 1349, the harvest in the vicinity brought in less than half the usual amount of corn.

High inflation followed the Black Death as a result of the reduction in the population and the King responded by legally forcing wages down and imposing a Poll (or head) Tax. Needless to say this was very unpopular and there were rebellions in the vicinity (the so-called Peasants' Revolt). Bromholm Priory was attacked and documents were destroyed in June 1381. Eventually the uprising was crushed and in July 1381 a commission was appointed to deal with the insurgents in Norfolk and Suffolk. There is evidence from their enquiry of the work of a Martham stonemason in Walcott and Ingham between 1440 & 1470.

=== Post Medieval ===
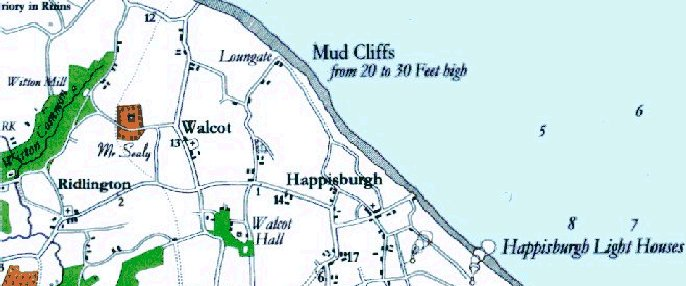
Extract from William Faden's 1797 map of Norfolk showing Walcott.

Most parish registers start shortly after the medieval period and in 1603 an incomplete list of church communicants for each parish was compiled. For Walcott the parish registers start in 1558 and there were 110 communicants in 1603. This suggests that Walcott had had an increase in population since 1088.

In August 1797, William Faden published the first comprehensive map of Norfolk that included Walcott. It is not completely to scale but is roughly correct.

In 1830 there was another rebellion due to the introduction of new farming techniques and machinery that put men out of work. The 'Swing riots' were so called because farmers would receive threatening letters signed by a 'Captain Swing', whose identity has never been determined. Farm machinery in Walcott was destroyed.

From the Whites Trade Directory dated 1845, Walcott had a population of 172 and 685 acres (2.77 km^{2}) of land. S. Bignold was lord of the manor. Robert Atkinson was High Constable. There was a Shopkeeper & Smith, a Wheelwright, John Warner ran the Light House Public House and there were seven Farmers

== Village amenities ==
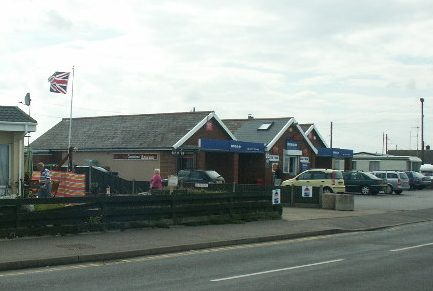
Walcott post office.

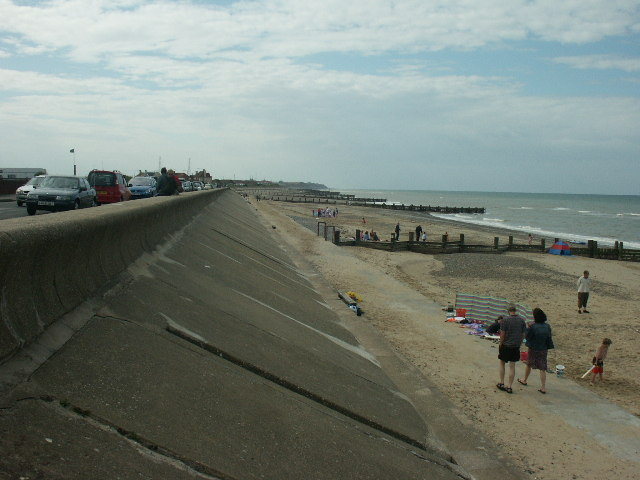
Walcott seafront.

The village has a parish church (All Saints, 14th – 15th century), 2 shops (one incorporating a sub-post office), several restaurants and pubs, a caravan site and an infant school.

There is access to the beach via:

- Walcott Gap, a wooden slipway that runs from the road to the sand and which can accommodate cars or tractors, and trailers, allowing for the launching of small craft including local fishing boats.
- Steps set into the sea defences at several points along the sea front.

== Public transport ==
There is an infrequent bus service through the village connecting it to North Walsham via a circular route.

The nearest railway station is at North Walsham for the Bittern Line which runs between Cromer and Norwich.

The nearest airport is Norwich International Airport.

== Floods ==
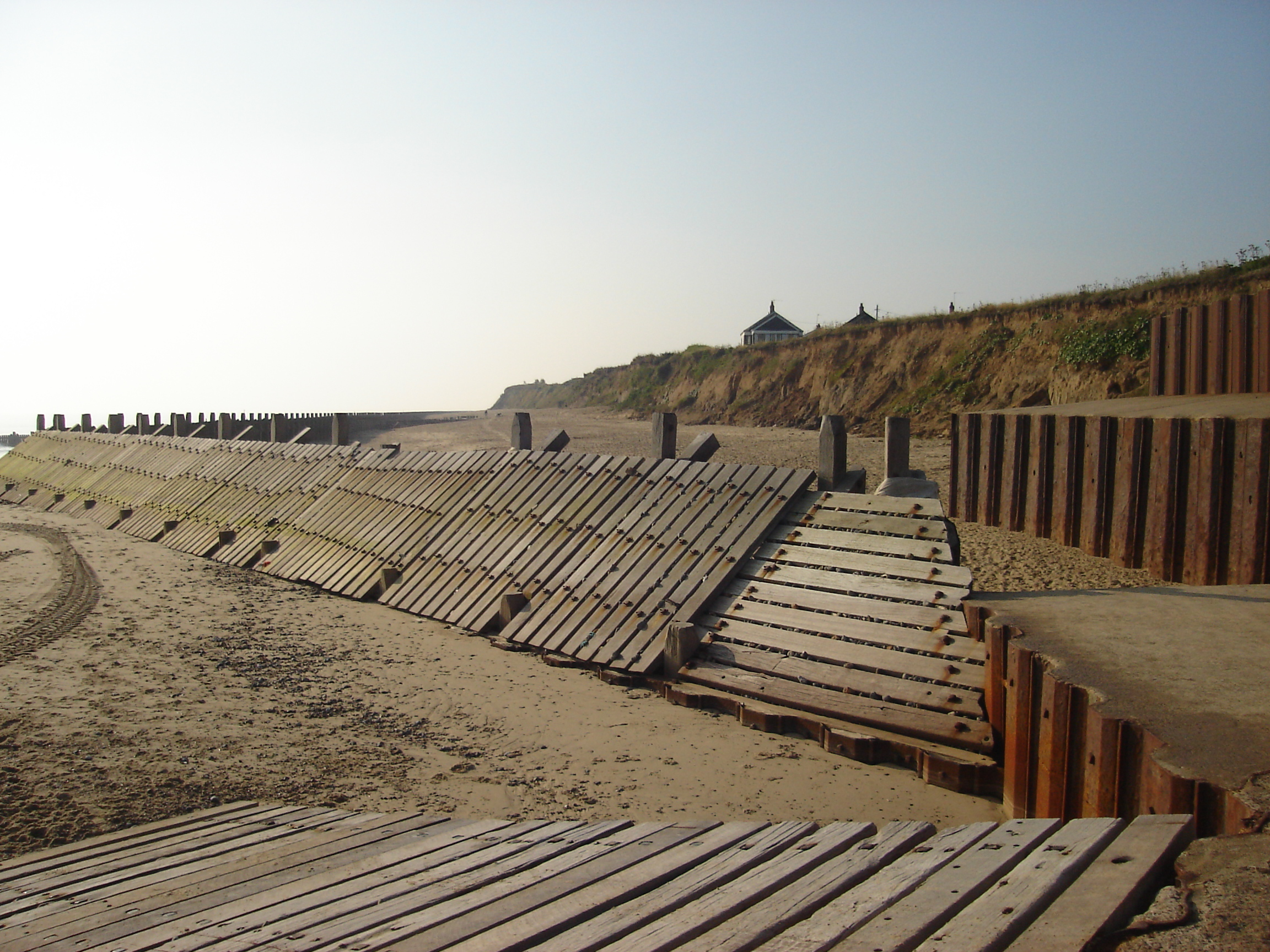
Revetments to the south-east of the village

=== North Sea flood of 1953 ===
On the night of 31 January 1953 a combination of a high spring tide and a severe European windstorm caused a storm tide. The area suffered greatly and much of the village was lost to the sea along with neighbouring Keswick.

=== North Sea flood of 2007 ===
On 10 November 2007 a storm surge hit the East Anglian coast. The sea wall in the village was breached by 12 ft (3.7 m) waves. Property was damaged and boats and caravans were blown across the coast road. The experimental film Wordland(2008) by Phil Coy features the devastation following the flood and interviews with affected locals.

=== North Sea flood of 2013 ===
The village was devastated by a storm surge on 5 December 2013. Dozens of homes and businesses were damaged.

In July 2019 a scheme commenced to deposit almost 3 million cubic yards (two million cubic metres) of sand, forming a 3¾ mile (6-kilometre) artificial dune, to protect nearby Bacton Gas Terminal. Costing £20 million, the scheme will also protect the villages of Bacton and Walcott. The dune will be 7 metres (23 ft) high and extend up to 250 metres (820 ft) out to sea.
