= Ostend (disambiguation) =

Ostend is a major coastal city in Belgium.

Ostend may also refer to:

== Places ==
- Arrondissement of Ostend, West Flanders, Belgium
- Ostend, Essex, England
- Ostend, Norfolk, England
- Ostend (Frankfurt am Main), a city district of Frankfurt am Main, Germany
- Ostend, New Zealand

== Other uses ==
- Ostend (Chamber of Representatives constituency), a constituency of the Belgian Chamber of Representatives from 1831 to 1900
- Ostend Company (1722–1731), a chartered trading company in the Austrian Netherlands (modern-day Belgium)
- Ostend Manifesto
- 9471 Ostend, a minor planet
- Ostend (painting), an 1844 painting by J.M.W. Turner

== See also ==
- Oostende (disambiguation)
- Ostende (disambiguation)
- Oosteinde, a village in North Holland
