= Oostende =

Oostende can mean:

- Ostend (Dutch: Oostende), a city in Belgium
- Oostende, Netherlands, a drowned village in Zeeland, Netherlands
- A.S.V. Oostende K.M., a Belgian football club
- BC Oostende, a Belgian professional basketball team
- Belgian minehunter Oostende

== See also ==
- Ostend (disambiguation)
- Ostende (disambiguation)
- Oosteinde, a village in North Holland
- Oosterend, North Holland
