= Wolcott =

Wolcott may refer to:

== Places in the United States ==
- Wolcott, Colorado
- Wolcott, Connecticut
- Wolcott, Indiana
- Wolcott, Kansas
- Wolcott, New York
- Wolcott (village), New York
- Wolcott, Vermont
- Fort Wolcott, Rhode Island

== People ==
- Alexander Wolcott, Connecticut politician
- Edward O. Wolcott, Colorado Senator
- Frank Wolcott, Union Army officer, rancher, and old west law man and outlaw
- F. S. Wolcott, American owner of the Rabbit's Foot traveling vaudeville company
- George Norton Wolcott, American entomologist
- Jackie Wolcott, American diplomat
- James Wolcott, American writer and critic
- Jesse P. Wolcott, U.S. Representative from Michigan
- Josiah O. Wolcott, U.S. Senator from Delaware
- Marion Post Wolcott, U.S. photographer for the Farm Security Administration
- Oliver Wolcott, one of the signers of the United States Declaration of Independence
- Oliver Wolcott Jr., 2nd United States Secretary of the Treasury and Governor of Connecticut
- Roger Wolcott (Massachusetts politician), Governor of Massachusetts
- Roger Wolcott (Connecticut politician), Governor of Connecticut

== Ships ==
- USRC Wolcott, more than one ship of the United States Revenue-Marine and United States Revenue Cutter Service

== See also ==
- Justice Wolcott (disambiguation)
