= Edingthorpe =

Village in Norfolk, England

Coordinates: 52.83°N 1.44°E

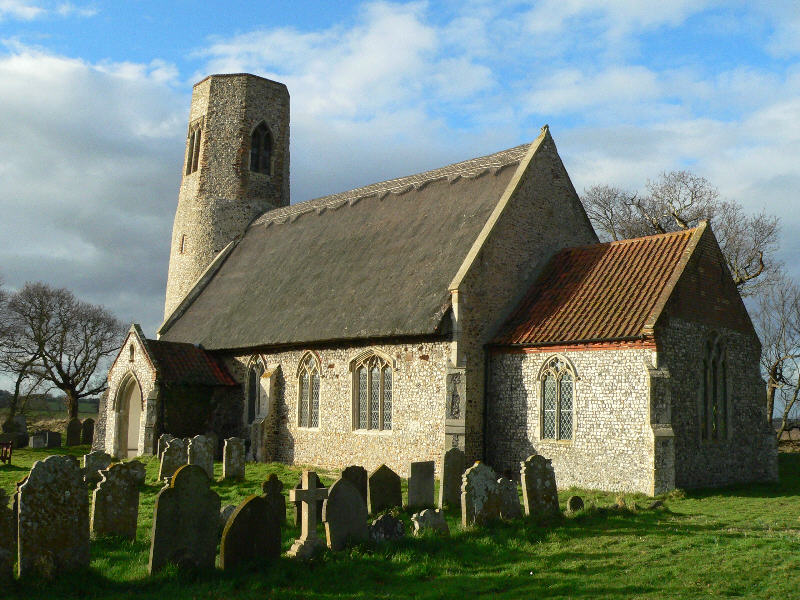
- All Saints' Church, Edingthorpe

- Location within Norfolk
- OS grid reference: TG319327
  - London: 114 miles (183 km)
- Civil parish: Bacton
- District: North Norfolk
- Shire county: Norfolk
- Region: East
- Country: England
- Sovereign state: United Kingdom
- Post town: NORTH WALSHAM
- Postcode district: NR28
- Dialling code: 01692
- Police: Norfolk
- Fire: Norfolk
- Ambulance: East of England
- UK Parliament: North Norfolk

Edingthorpe is a small village and former civil parish, now in the parish of Bacton, in the North Norfolk district, of the English county of Norfolk. The village is located 10 miles (16 km) south-east of Cromer and 18 miles (29 km) north-east of Norwich.

== History ==
Edingthorpe's name is of mixed Anglo-Saxon and Viking origin and derives from an amalgamation of the Old English and Old Norse for Eadgyth's or Eadgifu's farmstead or settlement. The etymology of Edingthorpe is unusual because both Eadgyth and Eadgifu are feminine names.

Edingthorpe is not listed in the Domesday Book.

In the Seventeenth Century, Edingthorpe Hall was built in the Jacobean style. The building was damaged by a fire in the Nineteenth Century and subsequently restored.

On 1 April 1935 the parish was abolished and merged with Bacton under the County of Norfolk Review Order, 1935.

== Geography ==
In 1931 the parish had a population of 213. This was the last time separate population statistics were collated for Edingthorpe, as in 1935 the parish was merged.

== All Saints' Church ==
Edingthorpe's church is one of Norfolk's remaining 124 Anglo-Saxon round tower churches and dates from the Fourteenth Century, with Twelfth Century foundations. All Saints' is located outside of the village on Church Lane and has been Grade I listed since 1955.

The church also features a Fourteenth Century painting of Saint Christopher.

"It has a very special dignity and simplicity, standing there on its low hill above the harvest fields as though it were the faithful servant of the life around it."- Siegfried Sassoon on All Saints' Church, Edingthorpe.

== Governance ==
Edingthorpe is part of the electoral ward of Bacton for local elections and is part of the district of North Norfolk.

The village's national constituency is North Norfolk, which has been represented by the Liberal Democrat Steff Aquarone MP since 2024.

== War Memorial ==
Edingthorpe War Memorial is a weathered stone memorial set into the wall of Green Farm. The memorial lists the following names for the First World War:

Rank	Name	Unit	Date of death	Burial/Commemoration
LCpl.	Bernard J. Muriel	1st Bn., Essex Regiment	13 Aug. 1915	Helles Memorial
Gdsm.	John W. Childs	2nd Bn., Coldstream Guards	28 Sep. 1916	Milton Cemetery
Gnr.	Robert Scott	67th Bty., Royal Garrison Artillery	6 Nov. 1916	Thistle Dump Cemetery
Pte.	Walter P. Pye	23rd Bn., Royal Fusiliers	25 Mar. 1918	Arras Memorial
Pte.	William G. Spinks	8th Bn., Norfolk Regiment	1 Jul. 1916	Thiepval Memorial

The memorial also lists the following for the Second World War:

Rank	Name	Unit	Date of death	Burial/Commemoration
FLt.	Reginald B. Oliver	Royal Air Force Volunteer Reserve	31 Mar. 1942	St. Andrew's Churchyard
Sgt.	John C. Hedge	RAFVR	15 May 1943	All Saints' Churchyard
Pte.	Cecil H. Scott	1st Bn., Royal Norfolk Regiment	27 Jun. 1944	La Délivrande War Cemetery
Pte.	John Neal	5th Bn., Royal Norfolk Regt.	27 Sep. 1943	Thanbyuzayat War Cemetery
