= Walcot =

Walcot may refer to:

== Places ==
- Walcot, Bath, a suburb of the city of Bath, England
- Walcot, Lincolnshire, near Folkingham, Lincolnshire, England
- Walcot, North Lincolnshire, a hamlet in the civil parish of Alkborough, Lincolnshire, England
- Walcot, Oxfordshire, a hamlet in Oxfordshire near Charlbury
- Walcot, Shropshire, a village in the borough of Telford and Wrekin, Shropshire, England
- Walcot, Swindon, a suburb

=== Derived names ===
- Walcot Hall, a Carolean country house, in Southorpe parish, now in Cambridgeshire, England
- Walcot Hall, a Georgian country house near Alkborough, North Lincolnshire, England
- Walcot Hall, a Georgian country house in Lydbury North parish, Shropshire, England

== People ==
- Thomas Walcot (1629–1685), British judge and politician
- Thomas Walcot (Lieut Colonel) (1625-1683), British soldier
- William Walcot (1874–1943), British architect, graphic artist and etcher

== See also ==
- Walcott, Lincolnshire
- Walcote (disambiguation)
- Walcott (disambiguation)
- Woolcott (disambiguation)
