= Bacton, Norfolk =

Village in Norfolk, England

Coordinates: 52.850°N 1.477°E

Bacton
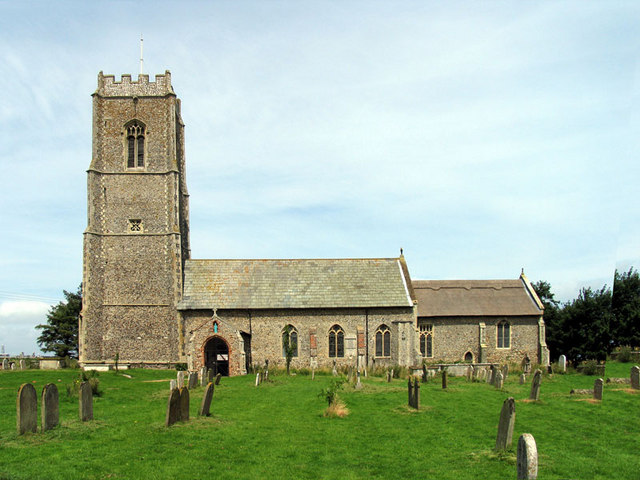
- St Andrew's Church, Bacton

- Location within Norfolk
- Area: 9.45 km^{2} (3.65 sq mi)
- Population: 1,194 (parish, 2011 census)
  - Density: 126/km^{2} (330/sq mi)
- OS grid reference: TG344337
  - London: 139 mi (224 km)
- Civil parish: Bacton
- District: North Norfolk
- Shire county: Norfolk
- Region: East
- Country: England
- Sovereign state: United Kingdom
- Post town: NORWICH
- Postcode district: NR12
- Dialling code: 01692
- Police: Norfolk
- Fire: Norfolk
- Ambulance: East of England
- UK Parliament: North Norfolk

Bacton is a village and civil parish in Norfolk, England. It is on the Norfolk coast, 12 miles (20 km) south-east of Cromer, 25 miles (40 km) north-west of Great Yarmouth and 19 miles (30 km) north of Norwich. Besides the village of Bacton, the parish includes the nearby settlements of Bacton Green, Broomholm, Keswick and Pollard Street. The civil parish of Bacton also includes Edingthorpe, which was added to Bacton civil parish under the County of Norfolk Review Order, 1935.

== Geography ==
The seaside village, whose name is derived from 'Bacca's farm/settlement', is located on the North Norfolk coast between Mundesley and Walcott, Norfolk. Bacton is known for its very quiet sandy beaches offering miles of walking along the beach and cliffs. The England Coast Path passes through the village and also the Paston Way long-distance footpath linking Cromer and North Walsham.

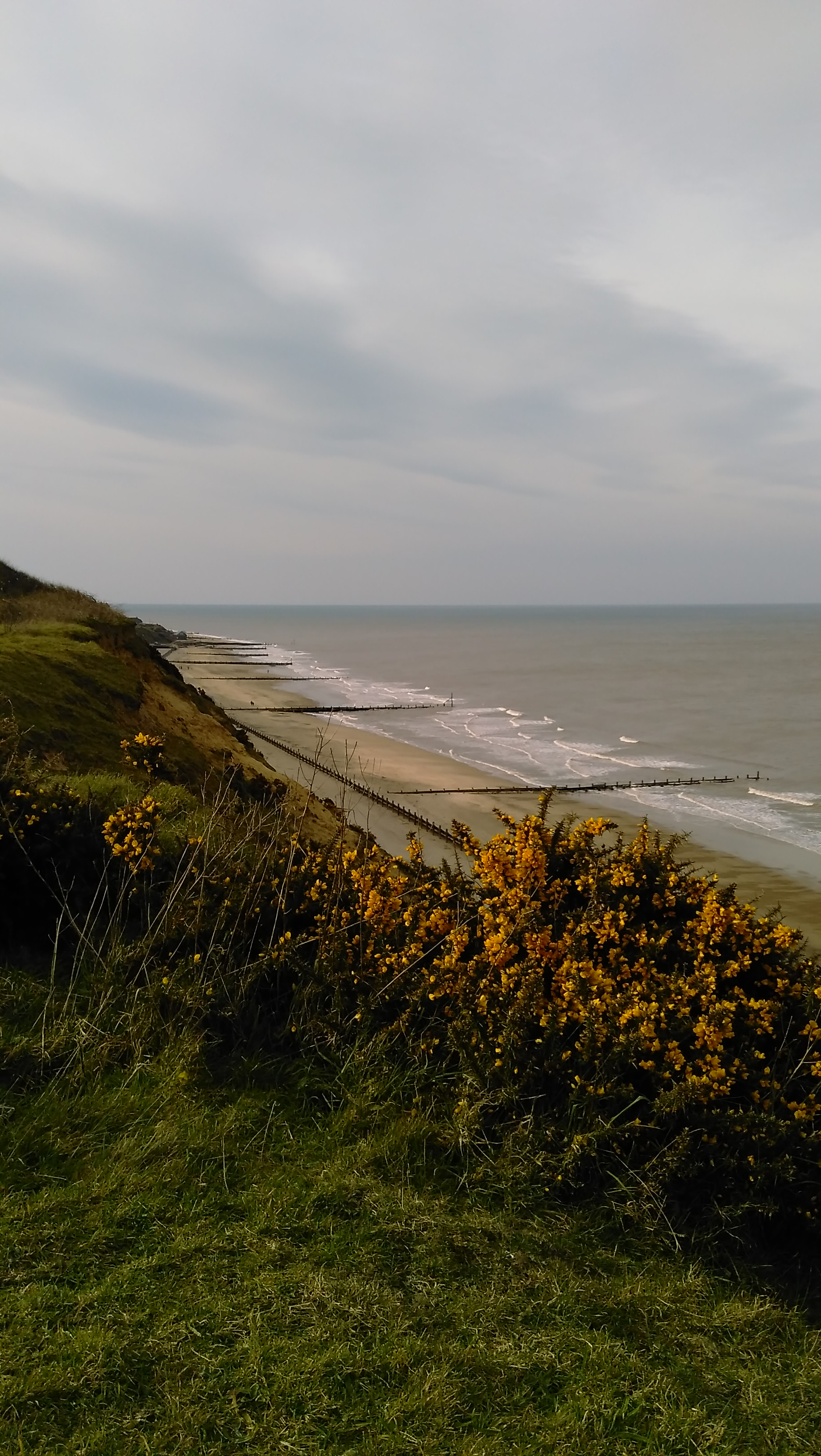
Bacton Beach

In the east of the parish can be found the ruined Cluniac Bromholm Priory.

The civil parish has an area of 9.45 square kilometres (3.65 sq mi) and at the 2001 census had a population of 1,130 in 474 households, increasing to 1,194 at the 2011 Census. For the purposes of local government, the parish falls within the district of North Norfolk.

Amenities in the village include: a village shop, a hotel, two cafes, a Chinese restaurant and kebab house, as well as a recreation ground. In addition there are several caravan parks and estates consisting of privately owned holiday chalets, giving holidaymakers access to the beach. During the First World War there was also an airfield located nearby, RAF Bacton.

== Coastal erosion ==
The village and adjoining coastline has extensive sea defences, erected to prevent coastal erosion. Part of this sea wall in nearby Walcott, Norfolk was damaged in the storm surge in December 2013, which caused damage to several caravans and chalets.

North of Bacton lies the village of Paston where the Bacton Gas Terminal is located. In July 2019 a scheme commenced to deposit almost two million cubic metres of sand, forming a 6-kilometre (4 mi) artificial dune. Costing £20 million, the scheme will protect the gas terminal, as well as the villages of Bacton and Walcott. The sea defences are expected to protect the area for between 15 and 20 years.

== Bacton Gas Terminal ==
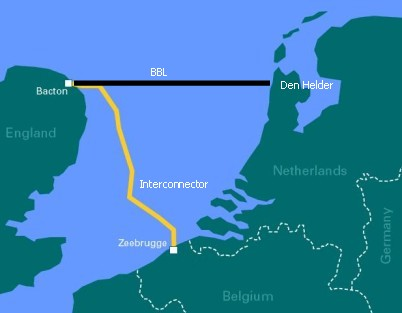
The BBL Pipeline

The Bacton Gas Terminal is at one end of a gas pipeline connecting England to the Netherlands. The pipeline runs from a compressor station at the Balgzand Gas Plant at Den Helder, North Holland, to a coastal terminal near Bacton. It began to be laid in July 2006 and became operational on 1 December 2006.
