= Walcote =

Walcote may refer to more than one place

- Walcote, Leicestershire
- Walcote, Warwickshire

== See also ==
- Walcot (disambiguation)
- Walcott (disambiguation)
