= RAF Bacton =

Former RAF station in Norfolk, England

RAF Bacton
- Near Norwich, Norfolk in England

Site information
- Type: Royal Air Force base
- Owner: Air Ministry
- Operator: Royal Air Force

Location
- Shown within Norfolk
- Coordinates: 52°51′25″N 001°28′09″E

Site history
- Built: 1915
- In use: 1915-1919

Airfield information
- Elevation: 12 metres (39 ft) AMSL
Runways
Direction	Length and surface
00/00	Grass field

RAF Bacton is a former Royal Air Force landing field, built to accommodate aircraft intercepting Zeppelin bombers during the First World War.

== History ==
A unit to use Bacton was a detachment of No. 219 Squadron RAF between 22 July 1918 and March 1919 with various aircraft along with No. 470 (Fighter) Flight.

A hangar from RAF Bacton was relocated to North Walsham after the closure of the airfield, where it became a garage workshop. This building was damaged in high winds, but an attempt to save the roof failed to salvage the structure, which was demolished in April 2007.

== See also ==
- List of former Royal Air Force stations
- List of Royal Air Force aircraft squadrons
