= Woolcott, Bracken County, Kentucky =

Unincorporated community in Kentucky, United States

Woolcott
- Unincorporated community
- Location within the state of Kentucky Woolcott (the United States)
- Coordinates: 38°43′58″N 84°6′1″W
- Country: United States
- State: Kentucky
- County: Bracken
- Elevation: 561 ft (171 m)
- Time zone: UTC-5 (Eastern (EST))
  - Summer (DST): UTC-4 (EDT)
- GNIS feature ID: 509408

Woolcott is an unincorporated community located in Bracken County, Kentucky, United States. It was also known as Murrays Station.
