= Punta de los Cuervos =

Punta de los Cuervos Also named Punta Estebanot
- Promontory
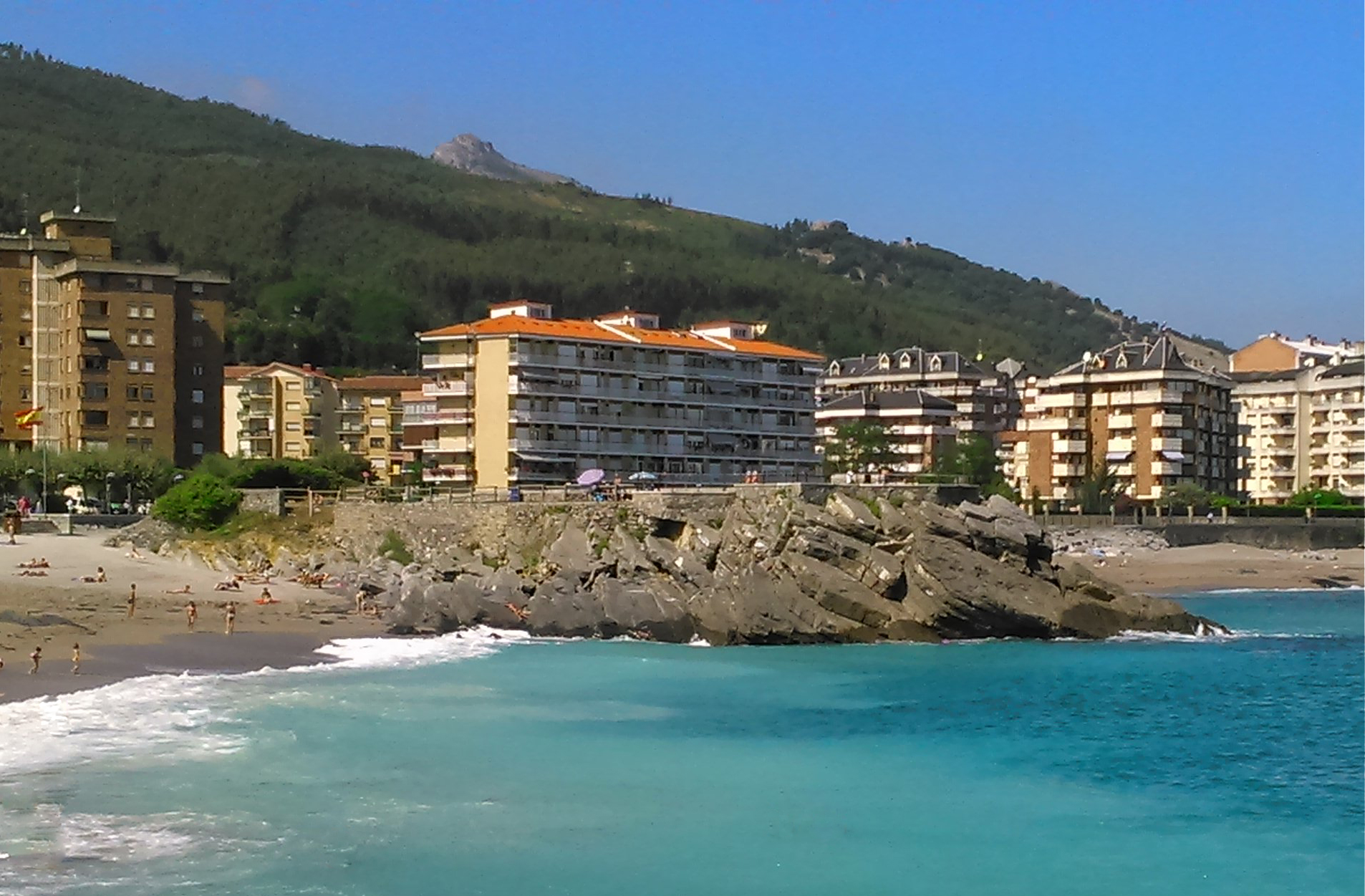
- The Punta de los Cuervos seen from the Ángel García Basoco Music Center
- Interactive map of Punta de los Cuervos
- Coordinates: 43°23′06.9″N 3°13′25.1″W
- Location: Castro Urdiales (Cantabria) Spain
- Offshore water bodies: Cantabric Sea

The Punta de los Cuervos is a promontory of land with rocky base, located in Castro Urdiales (Spain).

The start of the promontory is covered by the Playa de Ostende's artificial sand. It has access stairs and viewpoint.

During the first half of the 20th century, members of the Estebanot Family (of Zamoran origin), among whom was an engineer and an employee of the court, had a house near the Punta de los Cuervos (but not on the Punta), in the area known as "Los Hierros". But some people started to call it "Punta Estebanot" referring to this place, instead of its original name. However, the name "Punta Estebanot" or "Punta de Estebanot" has never been declared official.
