= Justice Wolcott =

Justice Wolcott may refer to:

- Roger Wolcott (Connecticut politician) (1679–1767), chief justice of the Superior Court of Connecticut
- Daniel F. Wolcott (1910–1973), associate justice of the Delaware Supreme Court
- Erastus Wolcott (1722–1793), justice of the Connecticut Supreme Court of Errors (now known as the Connecticut Supreme Court)
