= Bromholm Priory =

Monastery in Bacton, Norfolk, England

Coordinates: 52.844479°N 1.487463°E

- Location of Bromholm Priory in Norfolk
- Location: Near Bacton, Norfolk, England

History
- Built: 1113
- Demolished: 1536

Site notes
- Owner: On private land

Listed Building – Grade I
- Official name: Bromholm Priory ruins
- Designated: 16 April 1955
- Reference no.: 1373815

Listed Building – Grade II*
- Official name: Bromholm Priory: north gatehouse and attached precinct wall; Pillbox at Bromholm Priory
- Designated: 11 May 1987; 17 June 2016
- Reference no.: 1049146; 1434160

Bromholm Priory was a Cluniac establishment situated in a coastal location near the village of Bacton, Norfolk, England. The priory was founded in 1113 by William de Glanville, whose son confirmed and increased his father's endowments. The priory was under the jurisdiction of Castle Acre Priory until 1195, when it was exempted by Pope Celestine III. After Bromholm acquired a fragment of the True Cross taken from Baldwin I's imperial chapel at Constantinople in 1204, news spread rapidly across England. During the 13th century, the priory’s buildings was rebuilt on a larger scale. Henry III granted the priory fairs and a Monday market, which generated much of the priory's income. Amongst other patrons of the priory were members of the wealthy Paston family. The relic is mentioned in documents and other contemporary sources, such as Geoffrey Chaucer's The Reeve's Tale. The year after Bromholm was dissolved in 1536, the lawyer Robert Southwell was awarded the priory precinct. The buildings, which were abandoned and largely destroyed, later formed the nucleus of a farm. In 1834 the priory was a source of building materials for the Wodehouse family. Parts of the ruins in the farm were fortified at the beginning of World War Two as part of a coastal defence system.

The surviving structures reflect the priory's previous prestige and wealth, with the visible remains being the gates, the late 12th-century north transept, part of the south wall of the nave, a large amount of the chapter house, the dormitory, the east end of the refectory, parts of the precinct wall, and traces of possible fish ponds. The oldest and most substantial fragment of the priory is the north transept.

Although modern farming methods have made parts of the precinct unavailable for archaeological investigation, cropmarks have revealed the structural remains of the buildings, the extent of the precinct and the fields, and the existence of what may have been a medieval road. The area has been thoroughly surveyed by fieldwalkers and metal detectorists. The surviving ruins are Grade I and Grade II* listed.

== Background ==
Cluniac Reforms within Christian monasticism originated in 910 with the foundation in Burgundy of the Abbey of Cluny. (Note: Only Cluny was referred to as an abbey, the others were called priories.) Monks there followed the Rule of St Benedict, but their daily routine involved the copying of manuscripts and continual prayer, rather than the traditional Benedictine practice of undertaking manual labour. Cluniac reforms spread throughout Western Europe, and later to England—thirty-three Cluniac houses were founded in England following the foundation of Lewes Priory in 1077. All of the daughter houses throughout Europe were bound to the Abbey of Cluny, by such means as the election of priors, and direct payments to the mother abbey. During the 12th century, Cluny established the practise whereby the abbot was supposed to visit all the priories under its control. Due to the geographical isolation of England from the Continent, English priories were rarely visited.

Bromholm was one of three Cluniac priories founded in Norfolk, alongside those at Castle Acre (in 1089) and Thetford (in 1103). (Note: The west front of Castle Acre Priory is an example of the Cluniac emphasis on architectural elaboration.)

== Foundation and early period ==
The Cluniac priory at Bromholm, (Note: Variously written by authors as Bromholm, Broomholme or Broomholm Priory, Bromholme Priory, Bacton Abbey, and St Andrew's Priory.) was founded in 1113 by William de Glanville, lord of Bacton. It was dedicated to St Andrew. The priory was a cell under the jurisdiction of Castle Acre Priory until 1195, when it was exempted by Pope Celestine III, and came directly under the authority of Cluny. There is no evidence that an Anglo-Saxon monastery was ever established at the location where the priory ruins now exist.

Bartholomew, a son of William de Glanville, confirmed and increased his father's endowments. A charter produced for the Glanville family lists these as being the nearby churches of Keswick (at Bacton), Bromholm, Dilham, and Paston, along with the tithes of local estates. (Note: The charter mentions "two parts of the tithe of Stainges, Horham, Alreton, Rango, and Brig, also of Sneseling, with the whole of the tithe of his mills in Baketon (Bacton) and Wilefoot (Walcot), two parts of the tithe of Honing, and one mill at Mundesley in demesne, with the land of Herfrid the priest and part of his wood in the mill way to Takegate; two parts of the tithes of various homages and tenants; the tithe of the pannage (swine's food in the woods) of Bacton and Botham, and two parts of the right of turbage (the right of the turf) or turbary of Swathefield (? Swafield)." Bartholomew also went on to bequeath to the priory and his fields at Gristcombe, Paston church and its land, and "land at Guneho, Briges, Aldehithe, and Lawceland and of Edith de Briges, thirty acres by the sea, a meadow at Brescholm, a marsh near Bromholm, ten other acres by the sea, and the tithe of Richard the priest of Backettinia, all given in honour of God, the Virgin Mary, and St. Andrew, for the health of his own soul, his father's, and the souls of all his friends living and dead".)

== The Cross of Bromholm ==
=== Acquisition of a fragment of the True Cross ===
Folio f. 62v. from the Chronica Majora by Matthew Paris, in which the priory's acquisition of part of the True Cross is explained

From the 1230s, and until the priory was closed in the 1530s, Bromholm was a famous pilgrimage site throughout medieval England and western Christendom. Its fame was due to its possession of a fragment of the True Cross. The relic was said to have been acquired from an anonymous English priest, who had served in Baldwin I's imperial chapel at Constantinople and been placed in charge of a cross made from a part of the True Cross. In 1204, the priest fled the sack of the city, and eventually brought it to England.

From detailed accounts given in contemporary chronicles such as Chronica Majora, written by the Benedictine monk Matthew Paris, it is known that the priest offered the relic to several monasteries—notably St Albans— in return for an assurance that he and his two young sons be received as monks, but his offer was rejected until he arrived at Bromholm.

According to Paris, Baldwin marched against his enemies without the Cross and other relics, which were always carried before him in battle. His army was defeated by one ten times larger than his, and he disappeared after his men were defeated. The English chaplain who performed Divine Service for the emperor had charge of his relics and other effects. Upon hearing of Baldwin's presumed death, the priest stole the items and left Constantinople. At St. Albans he sold to the abbey a cross set in silver and gold, two fingers of a female saint, and some jewels. When he showed the wooden cross (constructed of two pieces of wood placed across one another, and almost as wide as a man's hand), his revelation of the nature of the relic wasn’t believed, and so he departed. He offered the cross to other monasteries, before arriving at Bromholm, which at that time was poverty-stricken and lacking proper buildings. The prior and brethren were delighted to accept the treasure.

The story of the acquisition of the so-called Rood of Bromholm was well known in medieval times; it appeared in chronicles by Roger of Wendover and Ralph of Coggeshall. As accounts of the acquisition of the relic are largely based on information provided by both Paris and Coggeshall, the year the relic arrived at Bromholm is not known for certain.

=== Veneration ===
A pilgrim's prayer card from the priory, depicting the Cross of Bromholm

News of the cross at Bromholm spread rapidly across England, and it became a destination for pilgrims. It was described as being stained with some of the blood of Christ. The chroniclers relate that immediately it was known about, divine miracles began to occur: the dead were restored to life, the blind recovered their sight, the lame walked, those possessed of devils were released from them, and the sick were healed. The 15th-century English historian John Capgrave wrote that: "no fewer than 39 persons were raised from the dead and 19 blind were restored to sight by the virtues of the Cross of Bromholm".

Inside a 14th-century book of hours, now in Lambeth Library, London, is an attached leaf upon which was painted a heart surrounding a depiction of the Rood of Bromholm. Above the heart is written Jesus Nazarenus Rex Judeorum ('Jesus of Nazarath, Kings of the Jews'). On either side are lines of text that form a couplet:

This cross yat here peyntyd is
Signe of ye cros of bromholm is.

Beneath the heart is a partly-erased comment, "Thys ys the holy cros that yt so sped, Be me ... in my need." Within the outline of the heart and around the cross is written, in minute and much contracted letters, a hymn.

=== The Cross in literature ===
By the rood of Bromholm was once a common oath in England. The relic is mentioned within a similar oath in Geoffrey Chaucer's The Reeve's Tale:

Till that the millner stumbled at a ston,
And doun he felle bakward on his wyf,
That wyste nothing of this nyce stryf;
For sche was falle asleepe a litel wight
With Jon the clerk, that waked al the night,
And with the falle right out of slepe sche brayde.
'Help, holy croys of Bromholme!¹ sche sayde,

The cross also appears in William Langland's Piers Plowman:

As I swear now (so thee [as] I!) that sin will I let,
And never wickedly weigh nor wicked chaffer use,
But wend to Walsingham, and my wife also,
And bid the Rood of Bromholm bring me out of debt.

— Passus 5, lines 224–227

According to the author William Purcell, Bromholm was less of than an aristocratic centre of pilgrimage than the nearby shrine of Our Lady of Walsingham. Purcell notes the significance of this in relation to the relic being mentioned in Piers Plowman and The Reeve's Tale: the former is "a proletarian poem of protest against the oppressions of the rich: and Chaucer's Reeves Tale is a vulgar and extremely funny story told by a working man".

== Priors at Bromholm ==
Name	Dates	Notes
Vincent		Temporary, during the reign of Henry I
Philip	c. 1210	
Vincent		Prior in 1229
Clement		Prior in 1258
John		Mentioned as prior in 1268, 1272.
Roger		In February 1285, Roger stated the need to attend to legal business in Norfolk as an excuse for non-attendance at the chapter-general at Cluny. In 1293, he excused himself because of ill-health.
William de Tutington	?–1313	
William de Witton	1313–?	
John de Hardingham	1334–?	
Clement Chandellier	?–1418	Resigned.
John Paston	1418–?	Became prior on 15 April 1418.
Nicholas		Mentioned as prior in 1419, 1425
John Paston	?–1430	Resigned.
Robert York	1430 –?	
John Tyteshall	1460–after 1480	Prior in 1461 Among the Paston Letters are two from Tyteshall, dated 1461 and c. 1480. In 1466 there were 10 monks.
John Macham	1504–?	
John Underwood	1509–?	Bishop of Chalcedon, prior in 1509.
William Lakenham		Prior in 1530, last prior at Bromholm.

== Patronage ==
=== Royal patronage ===
The daughter of Margaret of Scotland, Countess of Kent, the older sister of Alexander II of Scotland, visited Bromholm in 1233.

The royal patronage of Henry III raised both the wealth and status of Bromholm Priory

Due to its royal patronage by Henry III, Bromholm became recognised throughout medieval England as a place of pilgrimage. Henry was there on 5 April 1226 after having visited Walsingham; (Note: Walsingham had a more important shrine than Bromholm, which as a result was not in the same league of monastic houses.) other occasions in which he came to Bromholm—generally during Lent or just after Easter—included 1 July 1232, 16 February 1234, 13 March 1235, 23 March 1242, and 28 March 1245. The king granted the priory fairs around Holy Cross Day (14th September) and the Feast of St Andrew (30 November), as well as a Monday market, and in 1234 he granted the monks rights of tumbrel and pillory, (Note: A pillory was used to punish men; a tumbrel (an elevated chair) was used to punish women.) and exempted them from certain taxes. The fairs and markets generated much of the priory's income.

In 1233, following a period when he was staying at Bromholm with his court, Henry gave the prior the manor of Burgh Castle; in return the monks released to the King five marks a year. (Note: The grant was confirmed by Edward II in 1312, and continued until the priory was surrendered to the Crown.) Some 20 visits by Henry to the priory (along with gifts he made) were recorded. Donations include the money needed to create a gold crown for Bromholm's statue of Mary in 1241, oak trees for use in the construction of new buildings, and 3,000 thin candles for the chapel on the Feast of the Assumption in 1246.

Other gifts from kings included "four pipes of wine annually from the ports of Yarmouth and Kirkby" from Henry V in 1416.

=== Other patrons ===
Amongst other patrons of the priory were members of the wealthy Paston family. Prior John de Tytleshall wrote to Sir John Paston in 1460, asking for money and timber.

Following Paston's death in London in 1466, his body was brought to Bromholm, and he was interred at the east end of the church. The expenses of his interment were recorded in accounts, which reveal that it was a great occasion. Included as part of the drink consumed were "13 barrels of beer, 27 ditto of ale, one barrel of beer of the great assyze, [and] a runlet of wine of 15 gallons", along with geese, chickens, 1,300 eggs, 28 imperial gallons (130 L; 34 US gal) of milk and cream, 41 pigs, and 49 calves. Gold coins were showered among the people, a barber spent five days shaving the monks, the prior had a cope presented to him for the occasion, and Paston's tomb was covered with cloth of gold. The Paston family tomb chest now at St Margaret's Church, Paston, was originally at Bromholm.

In 1226, Richard Marsh, the bishop of Durham, made a grant for cut marble to use for the rebuilding of Bromholm.

== Decline and dissolution ==
In 1298 there were 25 monks at Bromholm; but a century later the number had decreased to 18. During this period, three masses were sung each day, and two more were said. The destitute state of the priory during the early 13th century, when it was described by Paris as being "very poor and destitute of buildings", and by Coggeshall as "old and worn out", was perhaps due to natural disasters: in 1385, Bromholm's lands were described as being "much wasted by the sea” and its buildings as being "recently burned".

In 1536, Henry VIII's commissioners, Thomas Legh and Richard Layton, visited Bromholm. They noted the existence of the priory's famous relic, along with the girdle and milk of Mary, mother of Jesus, and fragments of the crosses of two of the Apostles, Peter and Andrew. They reported that the prior and three of his monks had confessed their "incontinency". The county Commissioners for Suppression that year found at Bromholm four priests of "very good name and fame" residing at a well-maintained priory, along with 30 servants and labourers. According to the commissioners, the metal from the bells and the roof was worth £200, other goods were valued at £49, and the surrounding wood was considered to be worth 100 marks (£66 13s. 4d.) No records relating the survey of goods during the dissolution procedure have survived.

Bromholm was dissolved in 1536; at the time it was evaluated as having an annual income £109 0s. 8d. The following year, Robert Southwell, a lawyer at the Court of Augmentations, was awarded the priory, its land, and all its funds. In February 1537, he informed Henry VIII's chief minister Thomas Cromwell that the Rood of Bromholm was in his keeping. A second letter from Southwell to Cromwell, written at the end of the month, informed him that the cross had been delivered to Robert Codde, the last prior of Pentney Priory.

In 1547, Edward VI granted the priory and its land to Thomas Wodehouse of Waxham.

== Post-Dissolution history ==
Nathaniel Buck, The South East View of Bromholm Priory, in the County of Norfolk (1738)

The history of the priory following its dissolution is relatively unknown, although coins recovered from the area suggest that the site continued to function commercially in some form. The abandoned priory and its surrounding fields became a farm at some time after the 16th century. Most of the buildings in the precinct had been reduced to ruins by the time they were depicted by Nathaniel Buck in 1738. Buck's South East View of Bromholm Priory shows that the north transept to have been converted into a large dovecote, topped with a lantern roof.

Abbey Farm is depicted on both an 1827 enclosure map and an 1845 tithe map of the area.

In 1834 the priory was a source of building materials for the Wodehouse family, who owned the land; in 1854, it was recorded that crops were growing high where the priory church's altar had been, and parts of the church had been converted into a barn for storing tools, wood, and a cart.

Parts of the ruins were fortified at the beginning of World War Two; in 1940 the floor of the north transept was concreted over and cross-walls were added. It was then used as the location for a gun emplacement. A loopholed wall was built and spigot mortar bases were constructed within the site.

== Seal and arms ==
Impression created by the seal of Bromholm Priory

The prior's seal had a diameter of 3 inches (76 mm). It showed the priory church, with St Andrew depicted under an arch, seated and holding a cross. St Mary is shown within the arch, holding the infant Jesus. The seal's legend read: "Sigillum Prioris et conventus Sci. Andree De Bromhold".

The arms of Bromholm Priory were blazoned as argent, a cross voided sable, coticed of the last, all within a cordure, or.

== The Bromholm Psalter ==
The Bromholm Psalter, now in the Bodleian Library in Oxford, was made by the monks for their own use.

== Architecture ==
No remains of the earliest buildings at Bromholm (dating from the 12th century) have survived. The surviving structures were built at a later date by skilled craftsmen; they reflect the priory's later prestige and wealth as a pilgrimage site.

Bromholm's chapter house in 2019

During the 13th century, the priory was enlarged as a result of its increased wealth following the acquisition of the Cross of Bromholm. A plan made by a Mr Spurden in 1822 depicts the layout of the priory buildings as they appeared at the time. The layout bore similarities to Castle Acre Priory. The priory church possessed a tower and two transepts, a choir and two aisles. To the south of the south transept was a slype and the chapter house. South of the church was the dormitory, and to the west the cloister and a refectory. Spurden indicated what he considered to be a cemetery adjoining the chapter house.

The remains were described in 1911, when a booklet about the priory was published to raise funds for a local church—the entrance gateway, the remnants of some outlying rooms, the north transept, a smaller gate with a collapsed arch near a moat, and a "considerable portion of the church", were all mentioned. By 1984, other previously lost features had been identified, with the visible remains being the gates, the north transept, part of the south wall of the nave, a large amount of the chapter house, the dormitory, the east end of the refectory, parts of the precinct wall, and traces of possible fish ponds. Other medieval features such as fields and a road were identified using cropmarks.

=== North transept ===
Detail of the interior of the north transept

The oldest and most substantial fragment of the priory is the late 12th-century north transept. The north side has flat buttresses, semicircular-arched upper windows, a central doorway, and in one corner, a spiral staircase. The wall in the transept with the most detailing, it has three double-height shafts with two pairs of pointed arches at either end forming short sections of blank arcading. The clerestory has elaborately moulded round arched openings flanked by pairs of shafts with foliated capitals.

The east side, which has an opening with a shallow pointed arch and responds with decorated scallops, would probably have led to a side chapel. There is an upper window opening. The west side openings are infilled with flint. The remains of the arch that would have spanned the north aisle is evident. The wall has two sets of paired openings, the lower (later) pair being more elaborate. The south side of the transept once opened into the body of the church, but was later filled in. On the right there is an opening with brick sides and a segmental arch. To the left are two arched openings, which may have been added to strengthen the structure.

=== Chapter house ===
The chapter house, where the prior met the monks each day, was the second most important building in the precinct, after the priory church. In terms of architectural detailing, the Early English Gothic chapterhouse at Bromholm is the second most notable of the priory ruins. It has tall blank arcading and 10 surviving arches on the north and south walls. Little of the east wall remains. Of the south transept, the only extant remains is a stone cladded wall.

=== Gatehouses ===
The north gatehouse, as depicted by Reverend Robert Simpson in Illustrations of Bromholm Priory (1888)

The north gateway has a perpendicular Gothic arch. Part of the precinct wall is visible to the east. A second gatehouse, to the west of the farm, consists of two stumps.

The ruined 15th-century north gatehouse was two bays deep. Towards the sound side, some of the knapped flint used to face the gatehouse still remains, as does the moulded four-centred arch that has shields on the spandrels flushwork decoration. There were once two rooms for the pilgrims. There are piers on each side. It is probable that there was an attached prison, as was the case at the priory at Binham.

=== Other features ===
The dormitory would have measured 90 by 22 feet (27.4 m × 6.7 m), and may have been extended in the early 13th century. Its east wall has remains that extend from the south side of the chapter house; it survives above the first storey in places, and has a pointed arch window above an opening. The south wall of the dormitory has a pointed arch alcove and in one corner is part of a vault that would have supported the floor above. On the west side of the dormitory is a substantial part of the wall that would have formed part of the refectory.

Alost nothing of the nave or aisles in the church have survived, other than a fragment of wall in the south aisle. A wall divides what little remains of the refectory from another chamber.

== Archaeology ==
The approximately heart-shaped precinct of Bromholm Priory was set within a 28 acres (11 ha) site on a low-lying hillock, 0.25 miles (400 m) from the coast. Concrete and yard metalling within the modern farm has made much of the site unavailable for archaeological investigation; none of the earthworks that may have once existed have survived. It is possible that a surviving drainage ditch within the precinct replaced a natural palaeochannel (revealed by cropmarks from aerial photographs) during the period.

Detail of area around Bromholm from Faden's Map of Norfolk (1797)

In 1935, a skeleton was discovered with a stone coffin in a field close to the priory ruins. A cropmark may correspond to one side of the cemetery identified by Spurdens. However, the cropmark continues north past the boundary shown on Spurdens’ plan. Other cropmarks have revealed the structural remains of the buildings, the extent of the precinct and the fields, and the existence of what may have been a medieval road. The cropmark, which is present to the west of the drainage ditch, reveals the road extending for 250 metres (820 ft). The road looks ditch-like, but is more likely to be a sunken lane that corresponds to a small road marked on William Faden’s 1797 map of the county. A part of the road was shown on the 1827 Bacton enclosure map as Green Lane, but the road disappeared during the following decades, probably due to lack of use. Between 1997 and 2006 the area was surveyed by fieldwalkers and metal detectorists, work that “contributed to the analysis of the use of space within the priory”.

Over 5,000 individual metallic objects have been recovered from the precinct as a result of metal detecting, with over 97% of them being scraps of lead sheeting, sometimes with iron nails still embedded in them, that would have originally been made when roof repairs were made. The rest of the lead finds were from seals, cooking pots, whorls, and windows. The nature and location of the coins discovered at Bromholm indicate that the monks and lay persons used money, and that at one time market stalls existed on the site. Few pilgrim tokens or ampullae have been recovered from the precinct, for reasons that are not yet fully understood.

The priory was recreated the artist James Mindham in 2020 using 3D modelling. His work was based on drone surveying, historical sources, and detailed groundwork.

== Sources ==
- Bacton Parish Church (1911). A Short Record of Bromholm Priory, Bacton, Norfolk. Guildford, UK: Billing & Sons.
- Bell, Robert, ed. (1878). Poetical Works of Geoffrey Chaucer. Vol. 1. London: George Bell & Sons.
- Byram-Wigfield, Ben, ed. (2006). William's Vision of Piers Plowman (PDF).
- Dahl, Louis Harald (1913). "Religious Houses". The Roman Camp and the Irish Saint at Burgh Castle: With Local History. London: Jarrold & Sons. OCLC 1569820022.
- Green, Charles (1842). The History, Antiquities, and Geology of Bacton, in Norfolk. Norwich, UK: Josiah Fletcher. OCLC 1046049412.
- Hall, Donald John (1965). English Mediaeval Pilgrimage. London: Routledge. OCLC 1148947690.
- Harrod, Henry (1857). "Bromholm Priory". Gleanings Among the Castles and Convents of Norfolk. Norwich, UK.
- Meeres, Frank (2001). Not of this World: Norfolk's Monastic Houses. Norwich, UK. ISBN 9780954115302.
- Pearce, Christopher (1999). Bromholm Priory: a case study of an English Cluniac monastic site (Thesis). Norwich, UK: University of East Anglia.
- Pestell, Tim (2000). "New surveys at Bromholm priory". Church Archaeology. 4: 52–54. ISSN 1366-8129.
- Pevsner, Nikolaus; Wilson, Bill (1997). Norfolk 1 : Norwich and North-East. London: Penguin Books. ISBN 978-0-14-071058-8.
- Powicke, F.M. (1941). "The Oath of Bromholm". The English Historical Review. 56 (224): 529–548 – via JSTOR.
- Purcell, William (1981). "Across East Anglia". Pilgrim's England: A Personal Journey. London; New York: Longman. OCLC 1345650574.
- Stevenson, Robert, ed. (1875). The Chronicles and Memorials of Great Britain and Ireland during the Middles Ages (in English and Latin). London: Longman.
