= USRC Wolcott =

USRC Wolcott and USRC Oliver Wolcott may refer to more than one ship of the United States Revenue-Marine (1790–1894) or United States Revenue Cutter Service (1894–1915):

- USRC Wolcott (1831), a revenue cutter launched in 1831 and sold in 1851
- USRC Wolcott (1873), a revenue cutter launched in 1873 and sold in 1897
