= Ostend, Norfolk =

Coordinates: 52.83806°N 1.50997°E

Ostend
- Location within Norfolk
- OS grid reference: TG365325
- District: North Norfolk
- Shire county: Norfolk
- Region: East
- Country: England
- Sovereign state: United Kingdom
- Post town: Norwich
- Postcode district: NR12

Ostend is a coastal settlement in the English county of Norfolk. The population is included in the civil parish of Walcott.

It is between the towns of Cromer and Caister-on-Sea being south of, and contiguous with, Walcott.

Ostend achieved a degree of national notability in June 2002 when a rare specimen of Cuvier's beaked whale (Ziphius cavirostris) was stranded on its beach.
