= Oosterend =

- Village
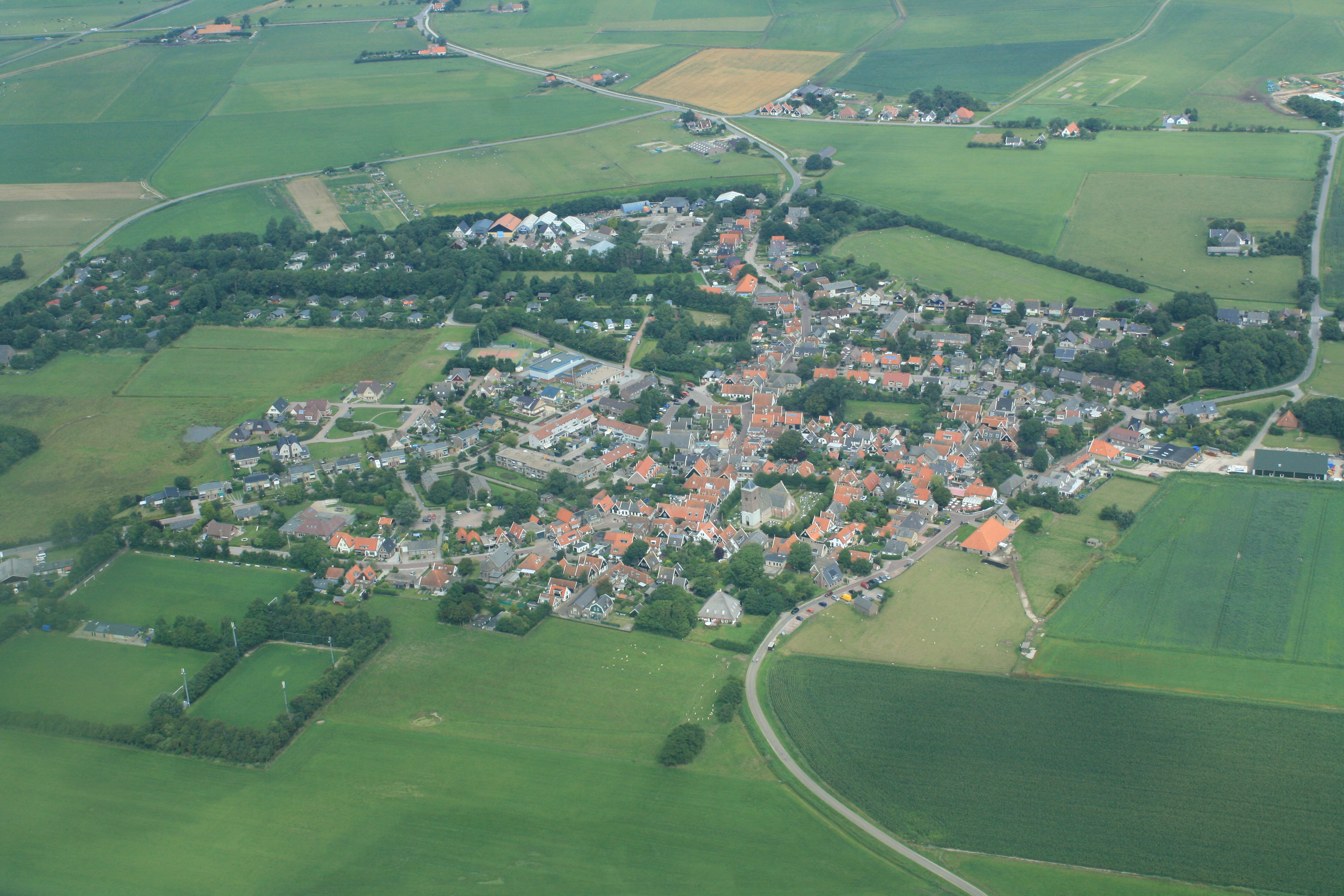
- Aerial view of Oosterend

- Location in the Netherlands Location in the province of North Holland in the Netherlands
- Coordinates: 53°05′N 4°52′E
- Country: Netherlands
- Province: North Holland
- Municipality: Texel

Area
  - Total: 1.01 km^{2} (0.39 sq mi)
- Elevation: 1.9 m (6.2 ft)

Population (2025)
  - Total: 940
  - Density: 930/km^{2} (2,400/sq mi)
- Time zone: UTC+1 (CET)
  - Summer (DST): UTC+2 (CEST)
- Postal code: 1794
- Dialing code: 0222
- Website: http://www.oosterendtexel.nl/

Oosterend is a village in the Dutch province of North Holland. It is a part of the municipality of Texel, and lies about 17 km northeast of Den Helder.

Oosterend is the second largest village on the island. Although it's situated further from the sea than Oudeschild it's the hometown of most fishermen on Texel. Oosterend is built around a church called Maartenskerk ("Saint Martin's Church"). The oldest parts of the church were built in the 11th century. Oosterend is sometimes called Jerusalem-of-the-north, this is caused due to five different religions in the village, Catholicism, Baptism, Dutch Reformed, Protestantism, Reformed-Gemeente. But this does not lead to conflicts, since all the religions live peacefully together. This is also the underlying cause of the fact that the relatively small community used to have three primary schools. From the school year 2013-2014 on they only have two left: The Catholic school and public school have fused into a public school with special attention for religion, since both schools ended up having less than fifty pupils. The even smaller reformed private school is, however, still in use.

== Gallery ==
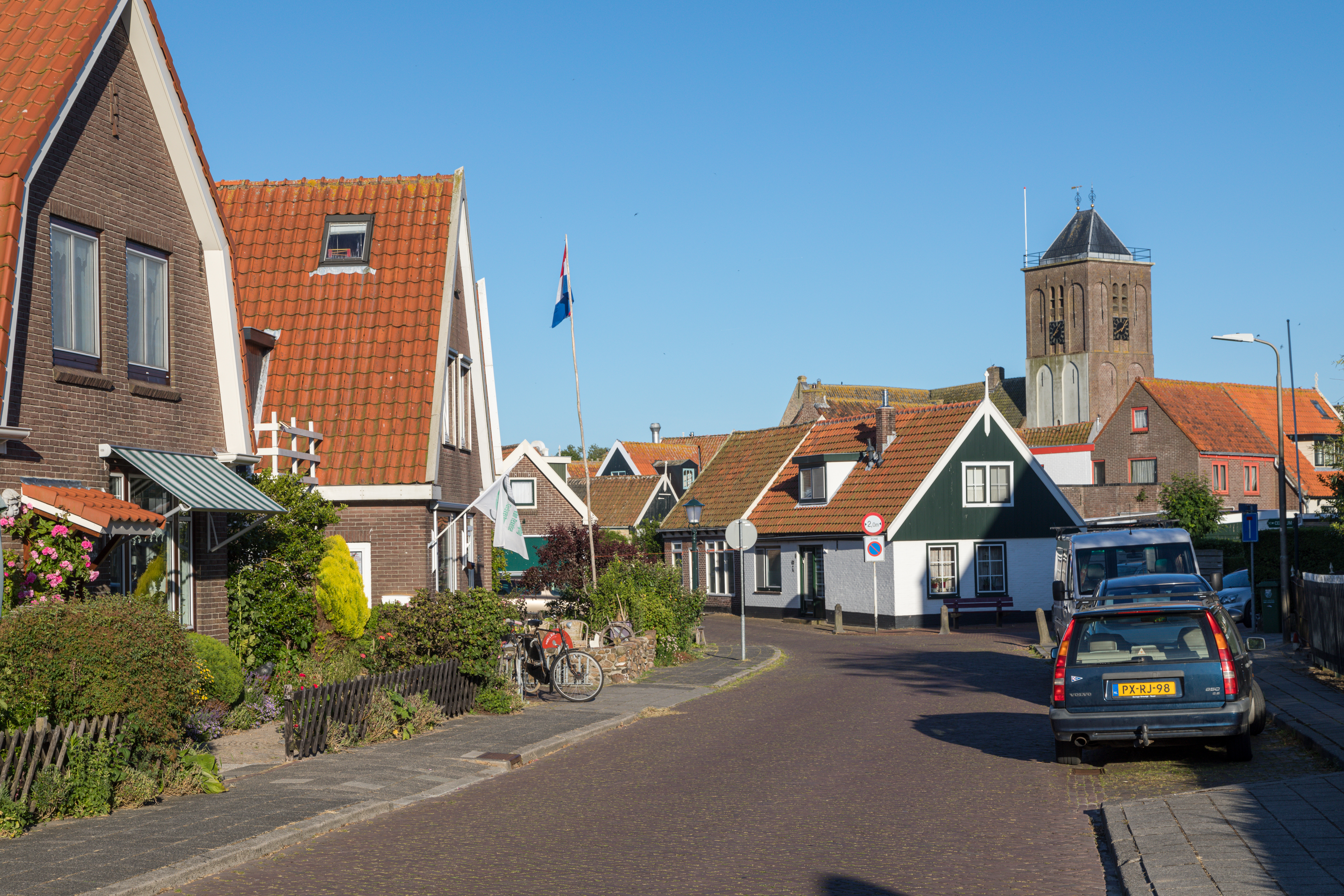
Street view

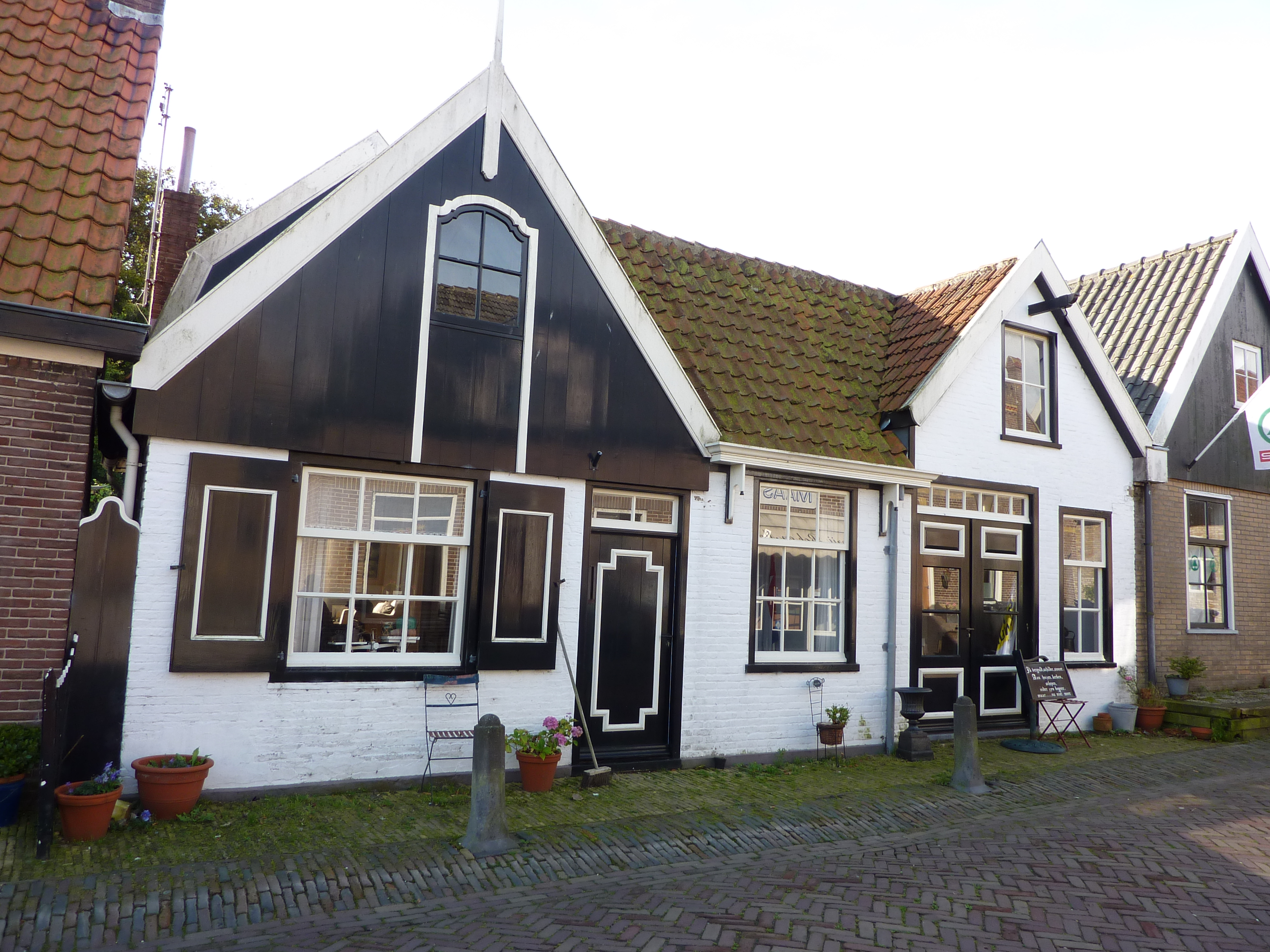
House in Oosterend

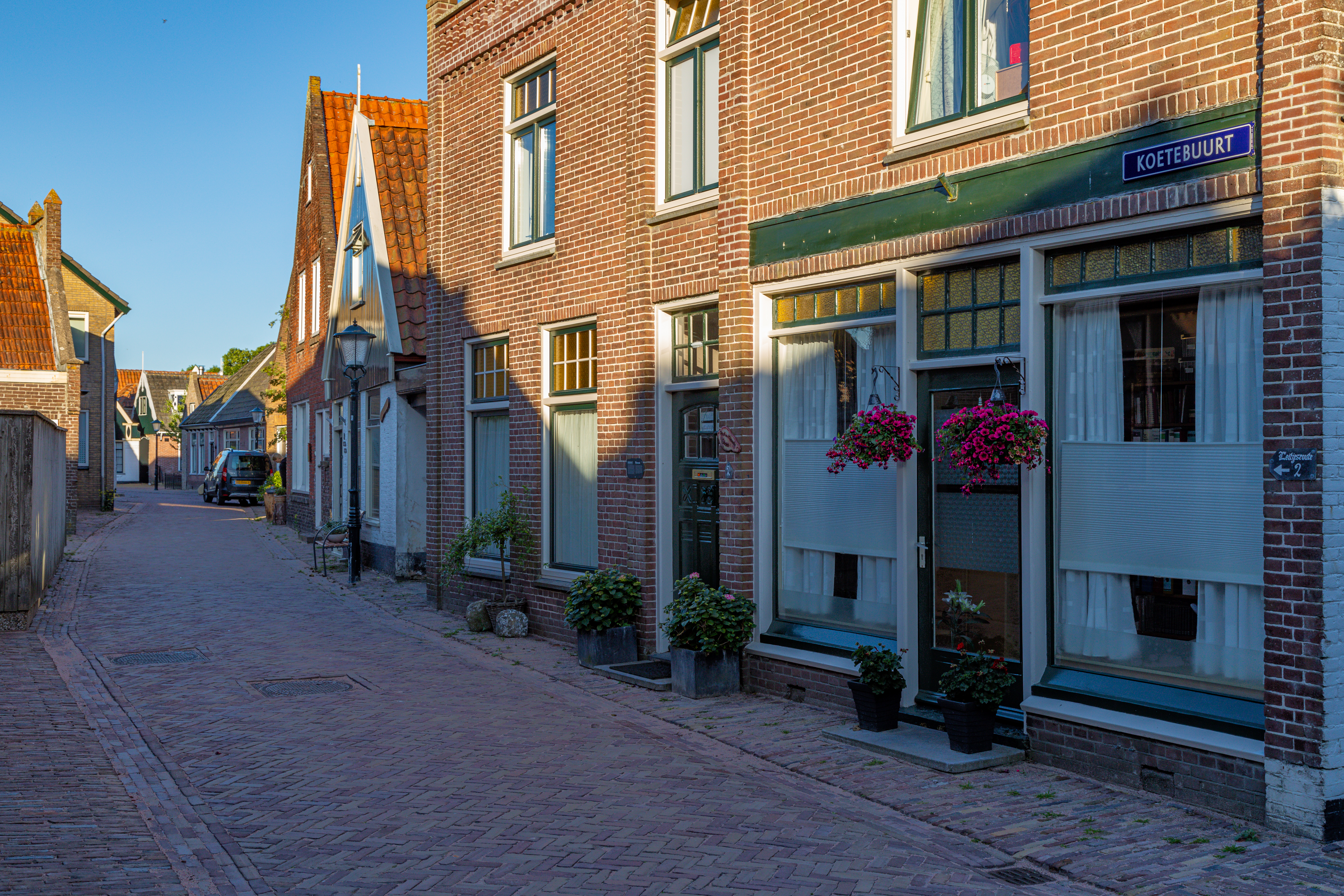
Street view

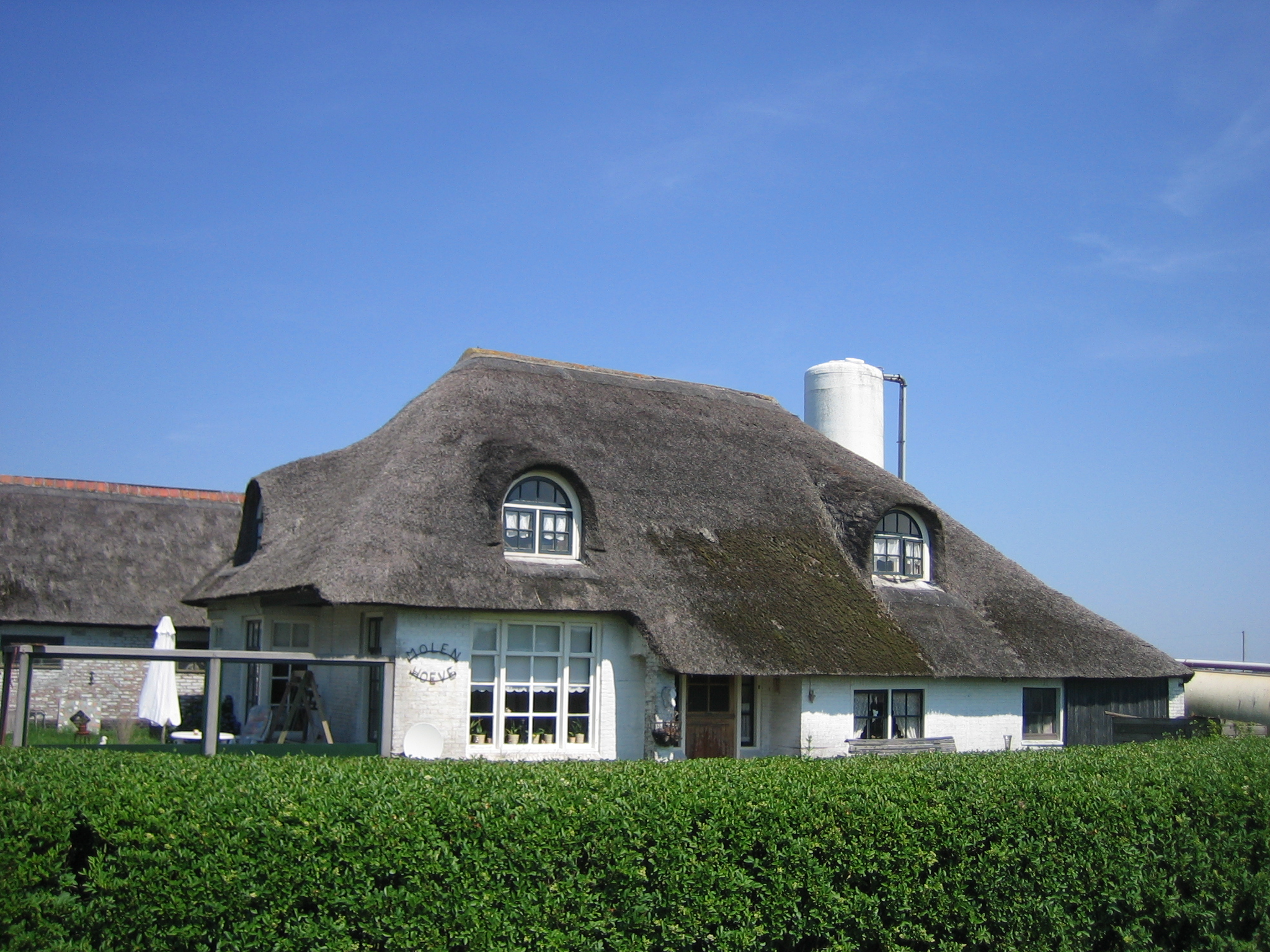
Farm in Oosterend
