= William Faden =

English cartographer

William Faden (1749–1836) was an English cartographer and a publisher of maps. He was the royal geographer to King George III. He replaced Thomas Jefferys in that role.

The title of "geographer to the king" was given to various people in the 18th century, including John Senex, Herman Moll, Emanuel Bowen and Thomas Jeffreys. All of these men, including William Faden, were engravers and publishers, not scholars or academics. Their part was to publish and supply maps to the crown and parliament.

== Life and works ==
William Faden was born as the son of the printer Willam Faden senior (1711-1783). He self printed the North American Atlas in 1777, and "...it became the most important atlas chronicling the Revolution's battles." There were 29 maps in the atlas, and they included detailed battle maps drawn by eyewitnesses.

William Faden was also the publisher of the periodical "the Public Ledger" or "The Daily Register" in London.

A list of the English county maps printed by William Faden is also given in one of his biographies.

== Gallery of maps ==
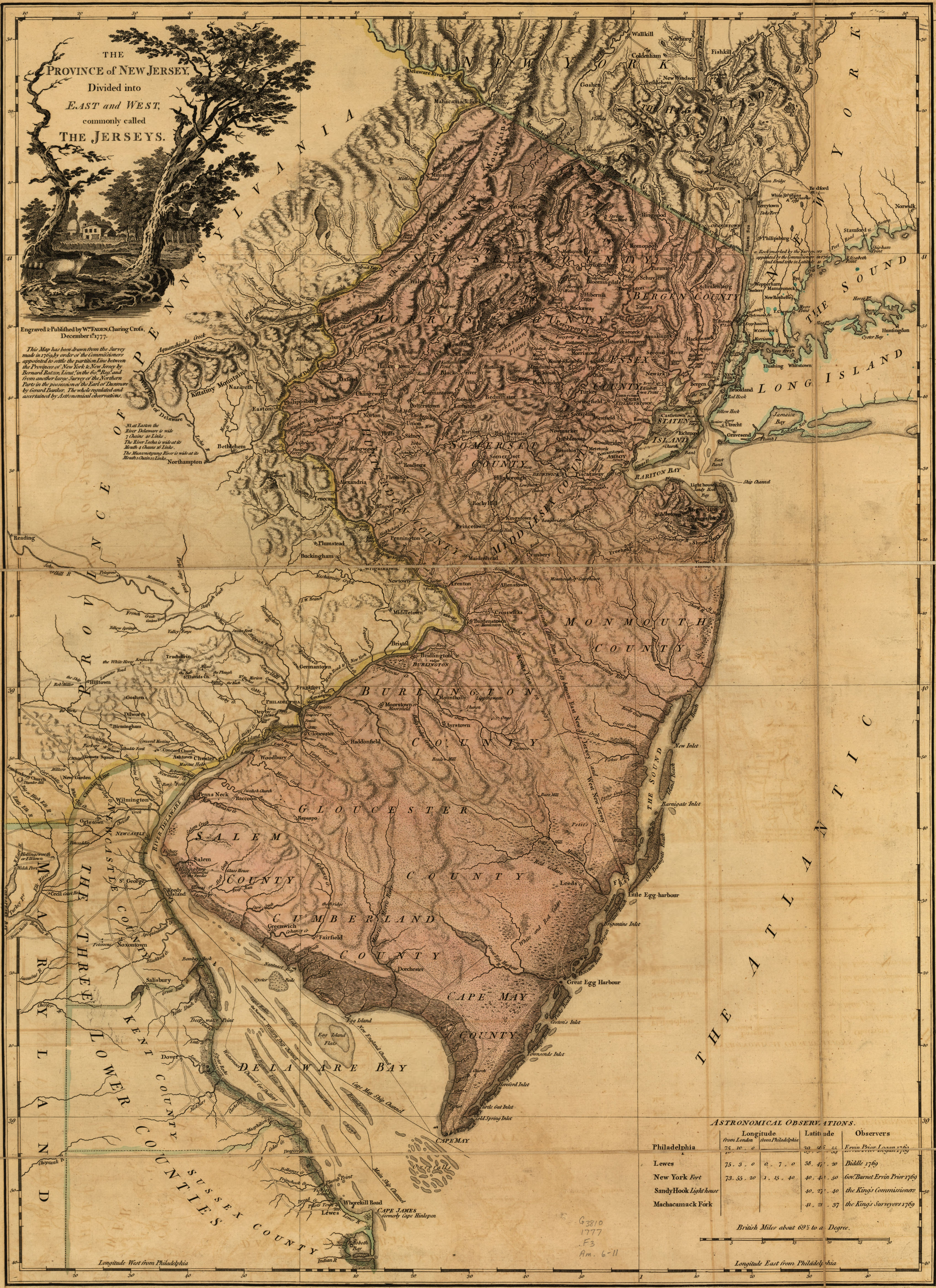
1777 map of New Jersey

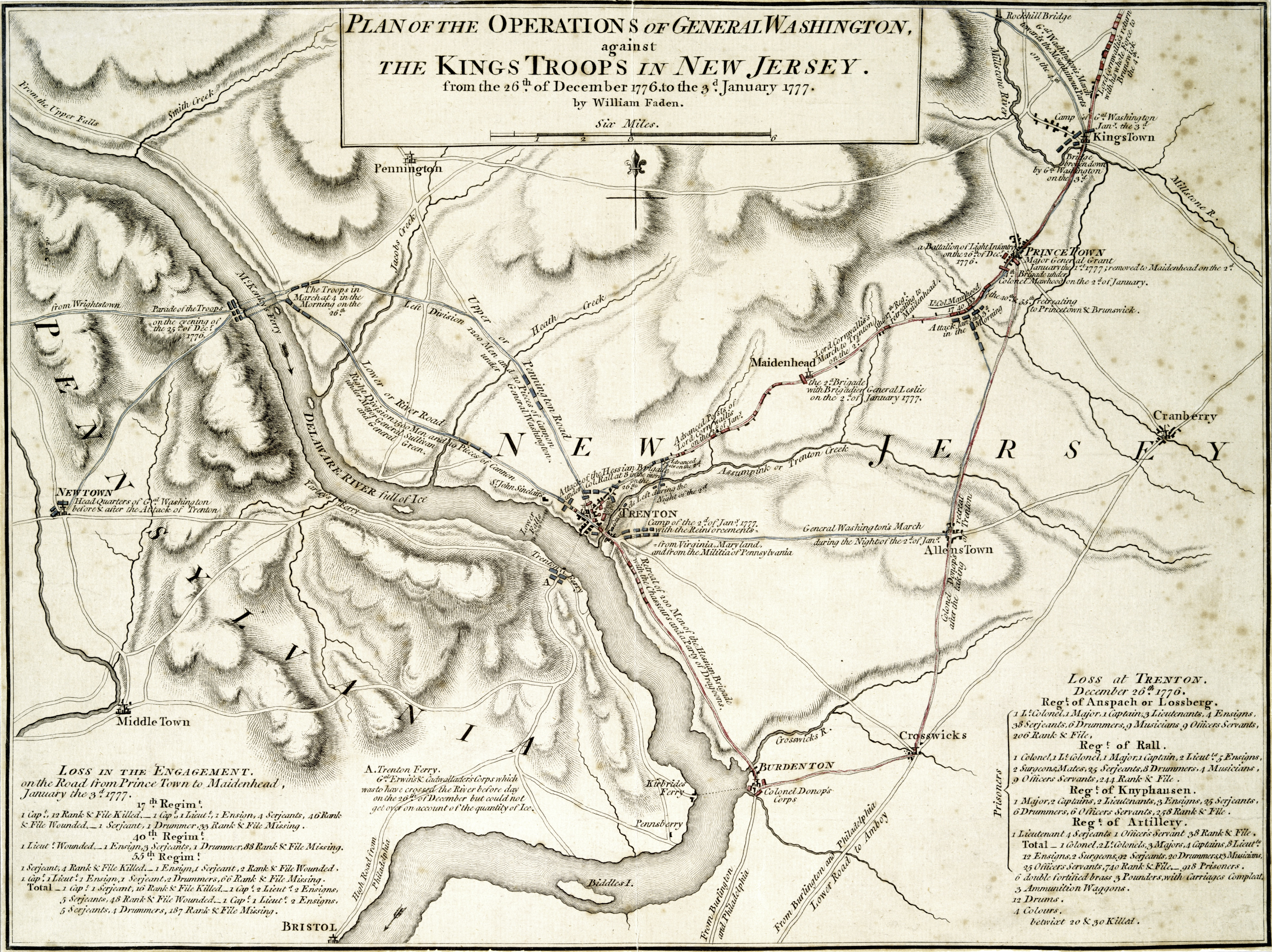
1777 military map of the Ten Crucial Days during the American Revolutionary War

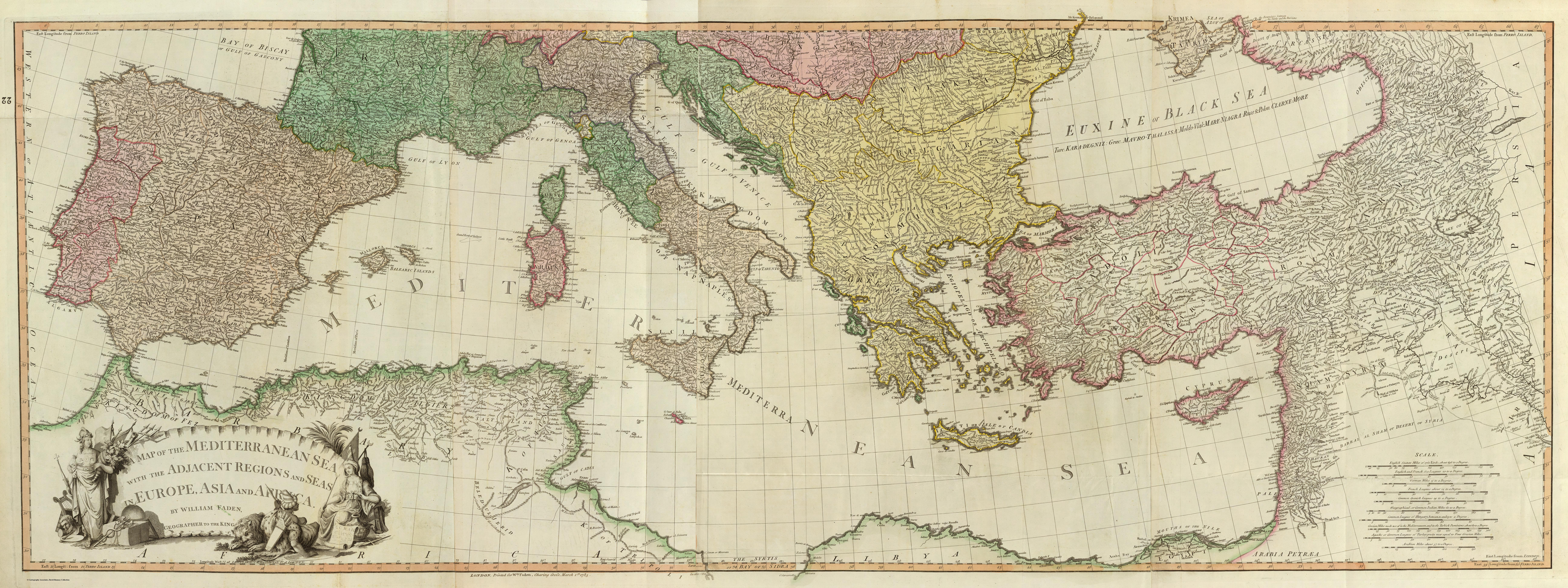
A 1785 map of the Mediterranean Sea with the Adjacent Regions and Seas in Europe, Asia and Africa

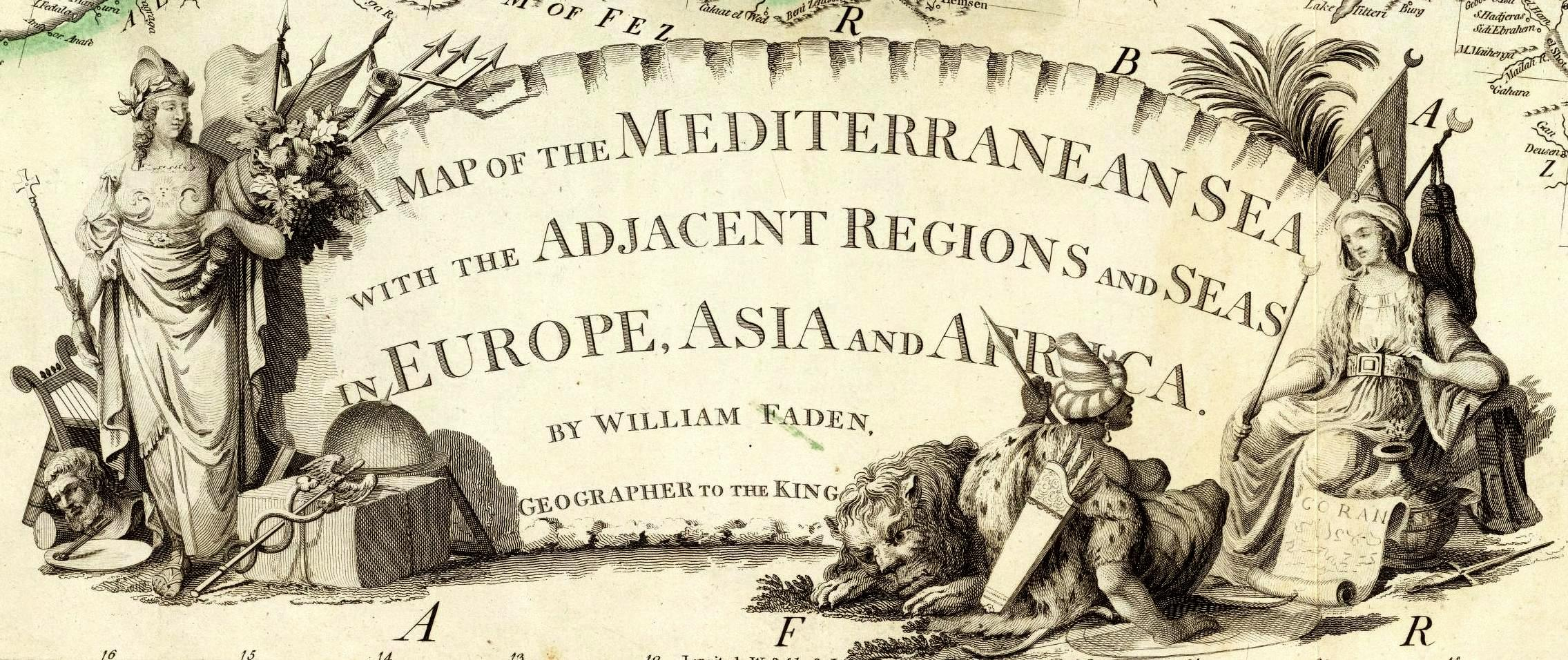
Close-up of imprint

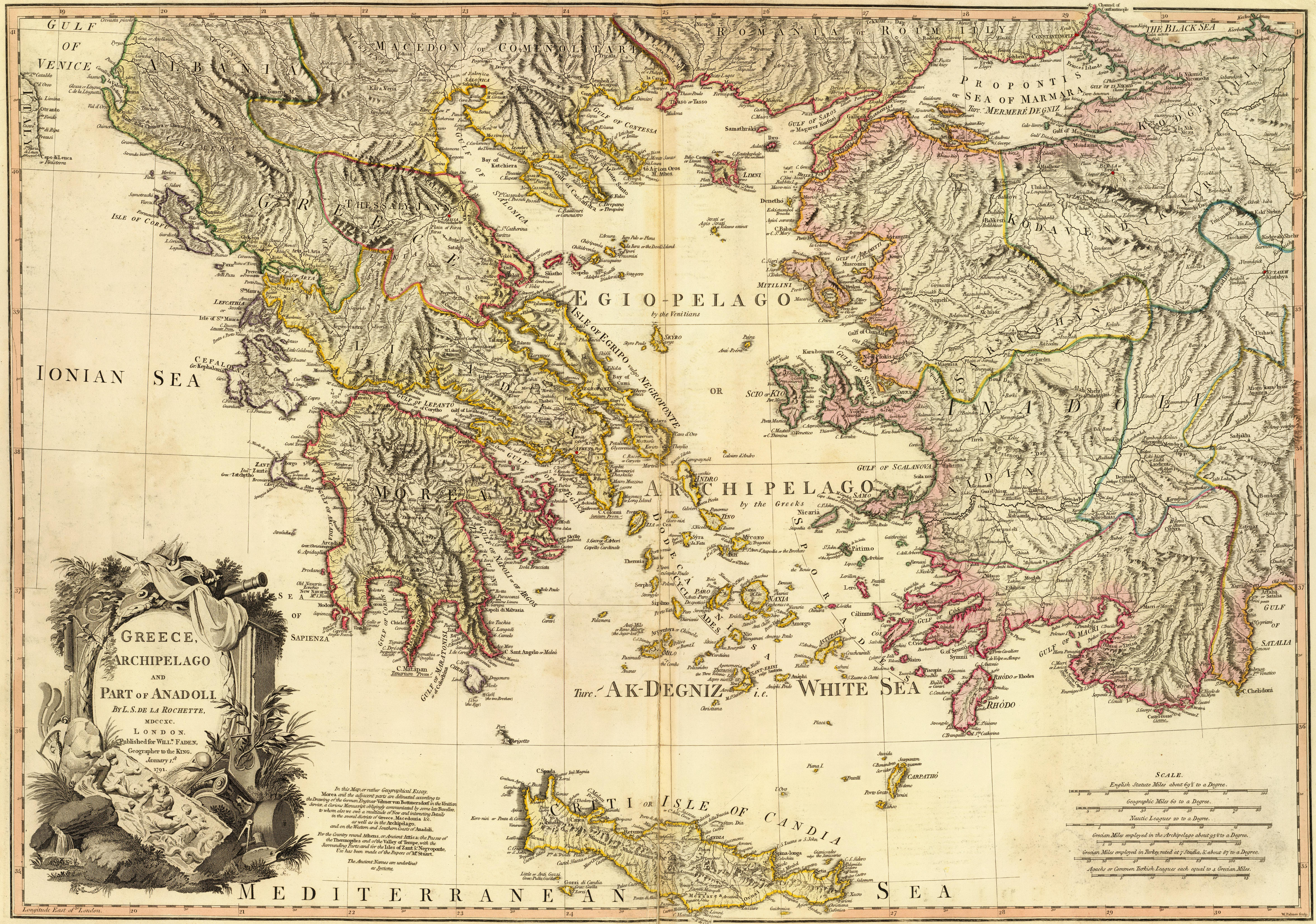
Map of Greece and Anatolia by Louis Stanislas d'Arcy Delarochette, published for William Faden

== Bibliography ==
- Faden, William. 1963. Catalogue of the geographical works, maps, plans, &c. published by W. Faden ... 1822. London: Map Collectors' Circle. Originally published: London: W. Faden, 1822. 16 pages.
- Jefferys, Thomas, William Faden, and Mary Sponberg Pedley. 2000. The map trade in the late eighteenth century: letters to the London map sellers Jefferys and Faden. Oxford: Voltaire Foundation. Correspondence in French, introduction and commentary in English.
- Laurence, W. (2004). "Faden, William". Oxford: Oxford University Press. Dictionary of National Biography.
- Williamson, T., & Macnair, A. (2010). William Faden and Norfolk's 18th-century landscape. Oxford: Windgather Press
