= Dale Abbey (ruin) =

Monastery ruins in Derbyshire, England

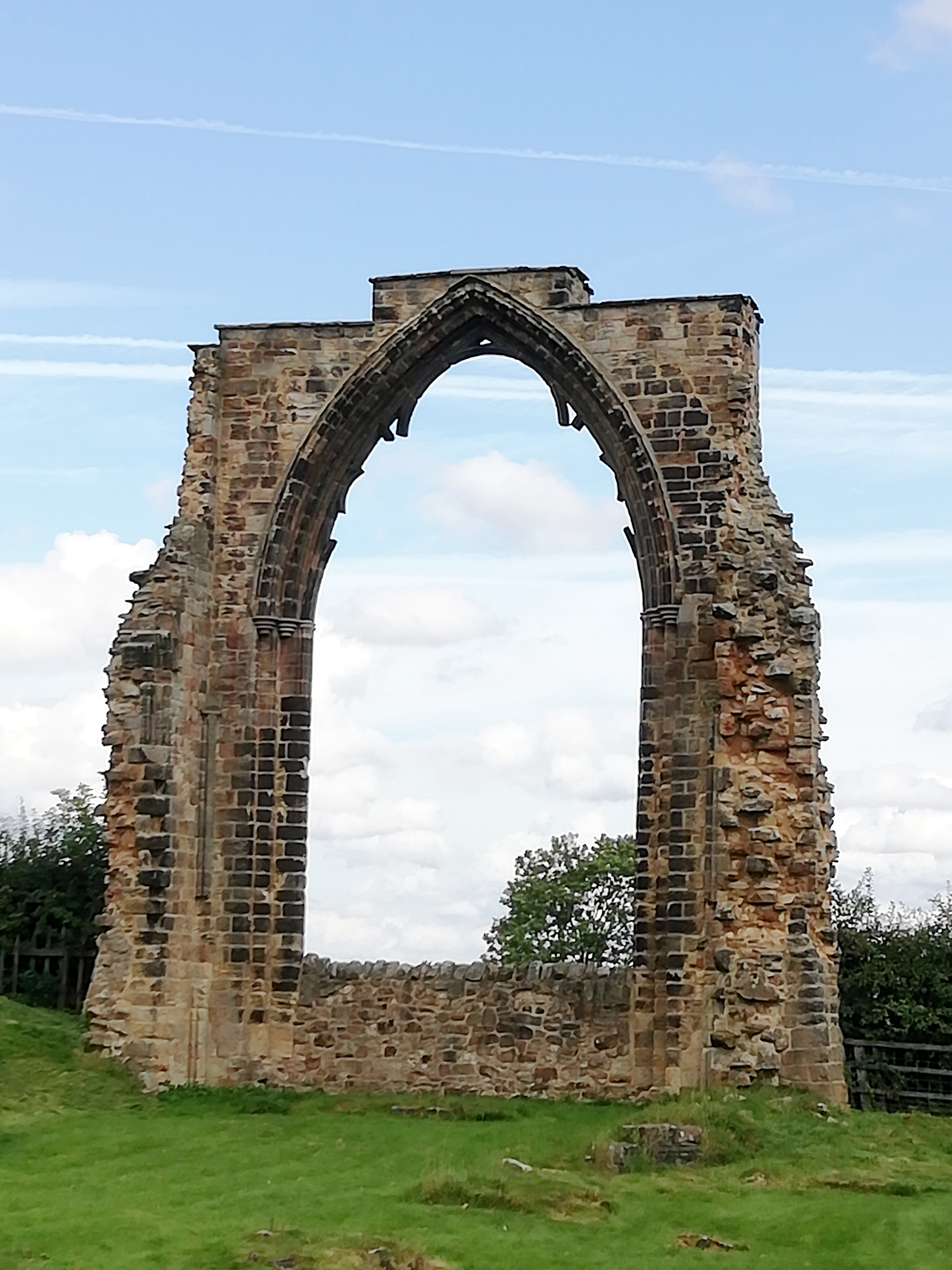
- Interior view of the east window, Dale Abbey, Derbyshire.

- Location within Derbyshire

Monastery information
- Full name: Church of the blessed Mary of Stanley Park - Ecclesia beatae Mariae de Parco Stanleye
- Order: Premonstratensian
- Established: 15 August 1204 (probably consecration of the church)
- Disestablished: 24 October 1538
- Mother house: Newsham Abbey
- Dedication: Mary, mother of Jesus
- Diocese: Diocese of Coventry and Lichfield
- Controlled churches: St Wilfrid's Church, Egginton * All Saints' Church, Kirk Hallam * St. Michael & All Angels Church, Stanton by Dale * St Helen's Church, Trowell * St Mary's Church, Greasley * St Mary's Church, Ilkeston * St Lawrence's Church, Heanor.

People
- Founders: William FitzRalph * Matilda de Salicosa Mara Geoffrey de Salicosa Mara

Site
- Location: Dale Abbey, near Ilkeston, Borough of Erewash, Derbyshire, DE7 4PN
- Coordinates: 52.9443°N 1.3502°W
- Grid reference: grid reference SK 43749 38740
- Visible remains: Arch of church east window, wall footings.

Listed Building – Grade I
- Official name: Abbey Ruins
- Designated: 10 November 1967
- Reference no.: 1140435

Listed Building – Grade I
- Official name: Church of All Saints and Vergers Farmhouse
- Designated: 10 November 1967
- Reference no.: 1140436

Scheduled monument
- Official name: Hermitage 170m south east of All Saints Church
- Designated: 12 April 1972
- Reference no.: 1019632
- Public access: East window visible from nearby footpath. Permission to vew footings and museum: contact Abbey House. Church still in use: contact parish office for visiting details. Hermitage open at all times.

Dale Abbey, also known as the Abbey of Stanley Park, was a religious house, close to Ilkeston in Derbyshire. Its ruins are located at the village of Dale Abbey, which is named after it. Its foundation legend portrays it as developing from a hermitage, probably in the early 12th century.

After several false starts, it was finally constituted as an abbey in 1204. It was affiliated to the Premonstratensians (also called Norbertines and White Canons), an order of canons regular in which it played, at times, a leading part among English houses. It acquired a large number of small properties, concentrated in areas of the East Midlands, developed a network of granges and appropriated a number of lucrative parish churches.

Its discipline and reputation varied considerably, particularly in the 15th century, and it seems to have fallen away from the original austerity. By 1536 its income was well below the threshold set for the Dissolution of Lesser Monasteries. Although there were accusations of grave immorality, the abbey was allowed to pay a fine to continue its existence until 1538.

== Foundation legends ==
From the Premonstratensian point of view, Dale Abbey was founded in 1204 from Newsham Abbey in Lincolnshire. However, the chronicle of the abbey, which dates from the mid-13th century, gives a long and detailed prehistory. The author of the chronicle was Thomas de Muskham: the initial letters of the various sections of the foundation legend make up the name T. H. O. M. A. S. D. E. M. V. S. C. A. Thomas did not trust in the detective work of later generations, but tells the reader explicitly that his name is in the capital letters of the text.

Muskham attributes the first part of the foundation legend to Matilda de Salicosa Mara of Lindsey, a local landowner whom he regarded as foundress of the community at Dale. Muskham's chronicle places the origins of the abbey early in the previous century and credits the initiative to a local baker who experienced a vision of The Blessed Virgin Mary telling him to go to Depedale. The baker kept the religious experience secret but immediately set off eastward. Passing through the village of Stanley, he overheard a woman dispatching her daughter to Deepdale with a herd of calves. The former baker took this as a sign from God and asked the woman the way. He was told to follow the girl to Deepdale and so quickly arrived at his destination, described as locum palustrem valde terribilem longeque ab omni habitacione hominum separatum — "a marshy place, extremely frightening, and far from human habitation." At the south east edge of the place he cut out a small rock house in the hillside and settled to an ascetic existence. A local landowner is named as Ralph Fitz Geremund, lord of a moiety of the manors of Ockbrook and Alvaston cum soc, i.e., holder of soke, the right and duty to constitute a court. He is portrayed by the chronicle as a Norman baron with interests on both sides of the Channel. He was so impressed by the hermit and the wretchedness of his existence that he granted him a tithe of the proceeds of his own mill at Burgh (now thought to be at Alvaston, although earlier at Borrowash). The remainder of the hermit's story is attributed to one Humfrid, a former canon. The hermit suffered spiritual torment in his later years, said by the chronicler to be the assaults of antiquus autem generis humani inimicus milleartifex – "the ancient enemy of human kind, master of a thousand tricks," that is, Satan. To gain relief from these assaults, and from the lack of water at his hermitage, he searched for a new home. By a spring in the little valley below he built a hut for himself and an oratory, dedicated to God and to the Blessed Mary, who seems to have been central to his spiritual life. There he lived in God's service until his death, which is described by the chronicler in almost Manichaean terms as release from the ergastulum, prison, of the body.

Thomas Muskham, the chronicler, then switches to an entirely different story, this time concerning the vision of a man he tells us was called Uthlagus and who was in the vicinity of Deepdale because of the regular traffic between Nottingham and Derby through the forest that stretched from the River Derwent bridge at Derby to the Erewash. Although Thomas does not tell us so explicitly, Uthlagus is not a name but a Latinised form of Old English utlaga, the modern English "outlaw." So presumably this man was a highway robber and when Thomas describes him as famosissimus it is in the sense of "extremely notorious," not "most renowned," as the translator has it: possibly the chronicler's ambiguity is deliberate. The outlaw fell asleep one summer day on Lindridge, the hill to the west of the later abbey site, and had a dream in which the future glory of the place was revealed to him. After revealing and explaining his dream vision, Uthlagus announced that it meant he could no longer keep company with his band. He took his leave and was not seen again, although it was rumoured he had become a hermit at Deepdale.

Muskham's account of the origins of religious life at Deepdale is marked by free use of legend, although key features of his account were probably plausible to his readers. It was not improbable that the area was plagued by banditry during the Anarchy of Stephen's reign, when at least some of his account is possibly set. A number of important new monasteries and even monastic orders of the early 12th century were credited to the work of individual hermits. A close parallel is Arrouaise Abbey in northern France, which its historians portrayed as appearing in bandit country and inspired by the work of a hermit called Roger. The Deepdale foundation and the Arrouaisians alike were secured a role in the Church by assimilation into an order of canons regular following the Rule of St. Augustine.

== False starts ==
=== Grendon family ===
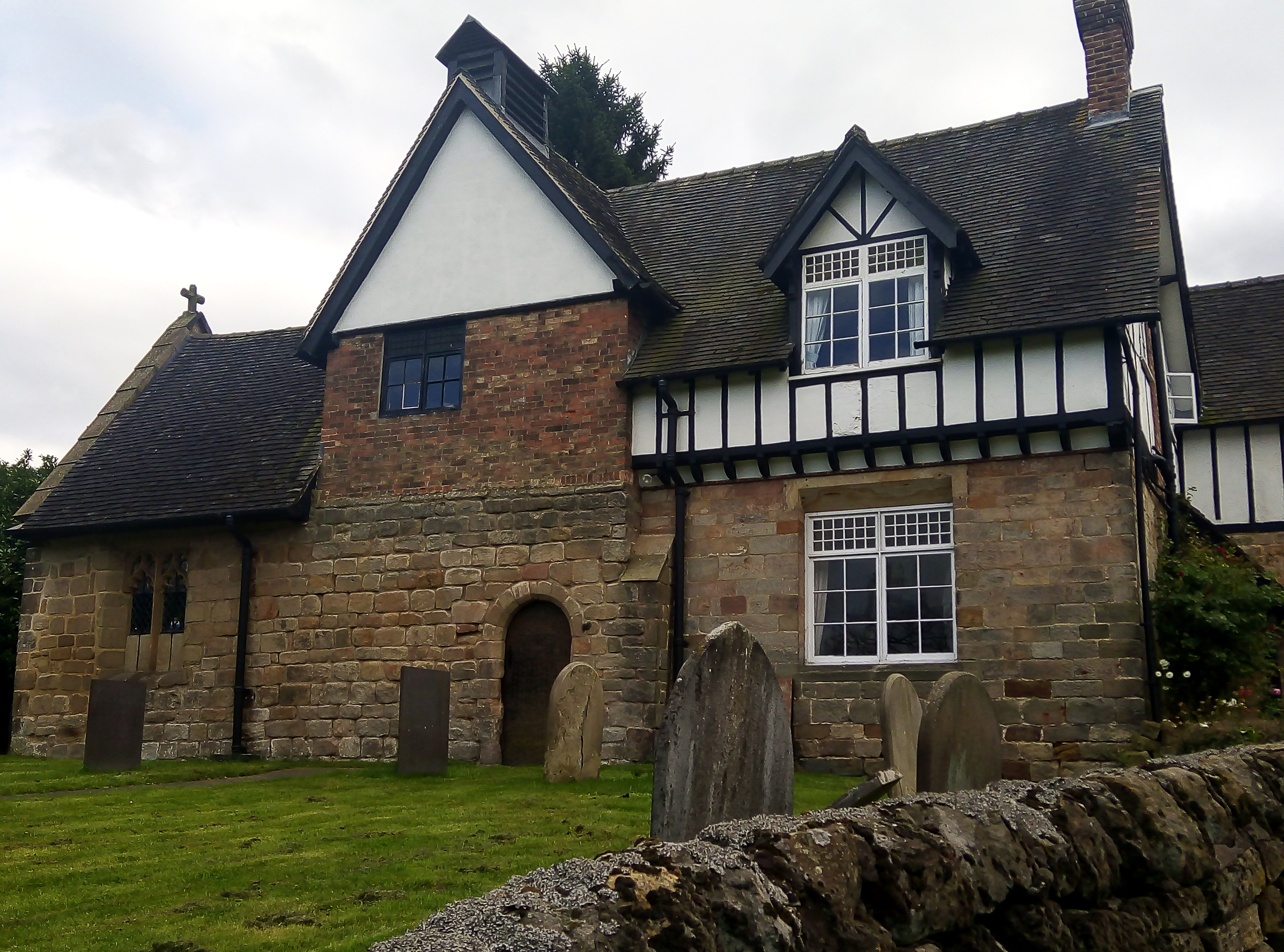
All Saints' Church and Verger's House, Dale Abbey, Derbyshire, viewed from footpath. The church was probably the abbey's infirmary chapel but the site is thought to be that occupied by the chapel of the hermit and the Gomme.

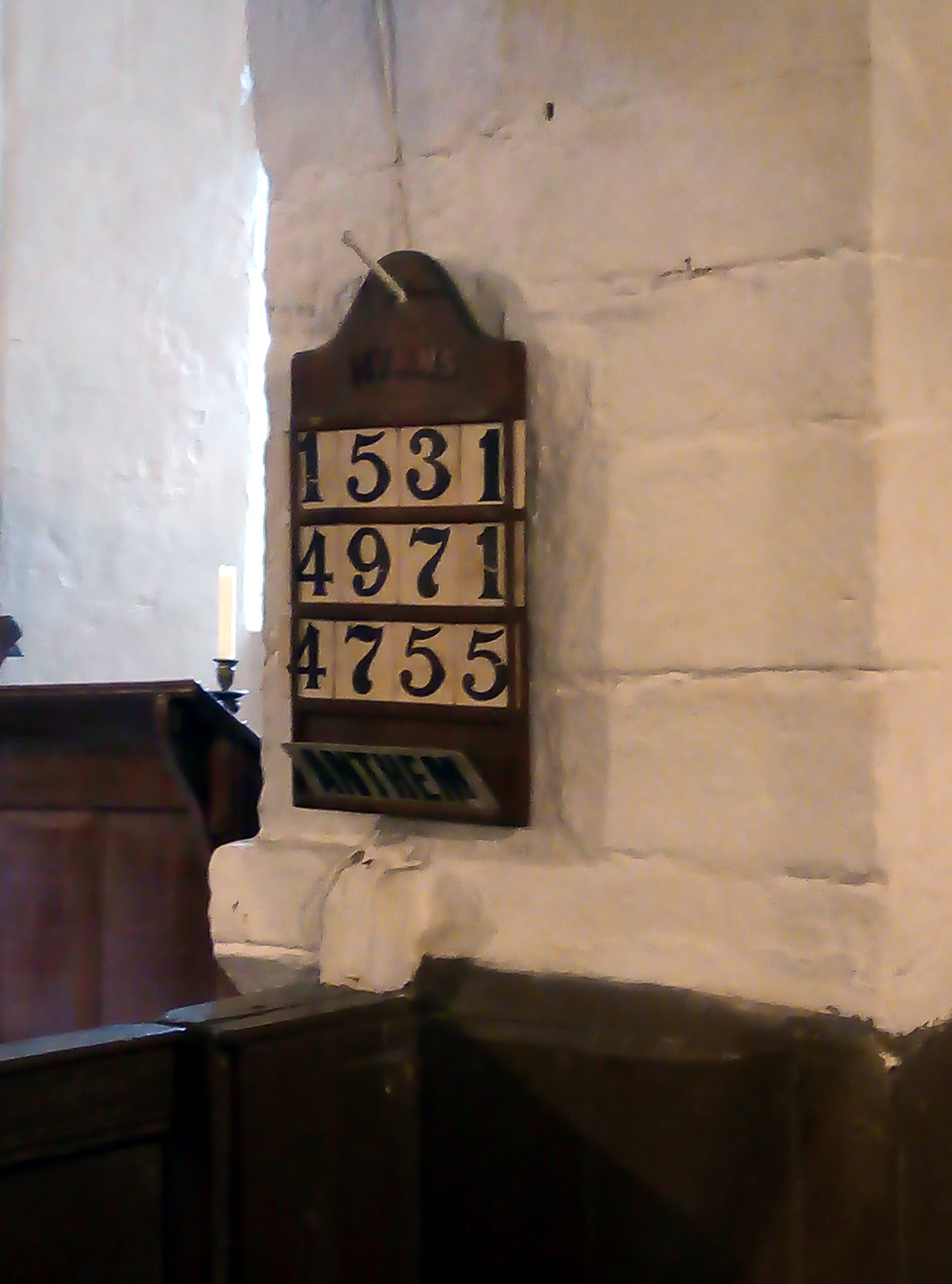
A small area of very old masonry that survives where the two aisles of All Saints' Church meet, showing Norman moulding and evidence an early 12th century origin for the chapel.

Thomas Muskham's account of the attempts to plant a cell of canons at Deepdale is very different from the foundation legends, outlining a process of trial and error by which members of a local landed gentry family, or group of families, sought to establish and consolidate a religious house at Deepdale. While he never gives actual dates, he does give enough information about contemporaries to locate events fairly closely in the history of 12th-century England.

The chronicle focusses on Serlo de Grendon, giving a detailed account of his family connections. Serlo enters the story because he married Margery, the daughter of Ralph de Geremund, the benefactor of the Deepdale hermit. The chronicler tells us that Serlo received a moiety of Ockbrook as Margery's dowry. He mentions that, although Serlo had several sons, his co-heirs ultimately were his three daughters, Johanna, Isolda and Agatha. They are also recorded in 1219 as involved in a suit over dower relating to Whittington, a manor within Grendon in Warwickshire. The overlordship of both Whittington and Grendon manors was held by the Ferrers family, with mesne lordship held by the Camville family, to whom the Grendons rendered their feudal dues. Serlo is not part of the succession given for the main manor of Grendon, so it seems that he belonged to a junior branch of the family that held Whittington, an estate in Grendon that became a separate manor. Serlo is styled by Muskham "lord of Bradley," a Derbyshire manor which had also the Ferrers family as Tenants-in-chief since the time of William the Conqueror. In the mid-12th century the head of the Ferrers family was Robert de Ferrers, 2nd Earl of Derby, whose wide political and ecclesiastical interests must have borne considerable weight for Serlo de Grendon.

Muskham tells us that Serlo de Grendon was particularly attached to an aunt who was also his godmother: as with a number of other figures linked to the foundation of Dale Abbey, her name is not given. Serlo made a lifetime grant of Deepdale to her and she thus became known as the Gomme or godmother of the Dale. She had a house constructed on part of what later became the abbey site and installed her own son, Richard, as chaplain, presumably in or on the site of the hermit's oratory.

=== Calke cell ===
On the Gomme's request, Serlo de Grendon granted Deepdale to the Augustinian community of Calke Priory and Richard the chaplain entered the Augustinian order to join them. Calke had done well from the wealth of Ranulf de Gernon, 4th Earl of Chester, powerful in Warwickshire and Leicestershire, who had found the Anarchy of Stephen's reign particularly lucrative. After his death in 1153, his widow Maud had assured the survival and future prosperity of the Calke community by granting them the church at Repton and other property on the express condition that they move their headquarters and establish a new priory at Repton at the first suitable opportunity. Although this was not to happen until 1172, the canons seem to have been prepared for colonisation. Robert de Ferrers, Serlo de Grendon's overlord, was another important benefactor of Calke, and the desire to remain on good terms with such a powerful figure may have played some part in the choice of that particular priory.

An Augustinian colony from Calke became established at Deepdale, comprising six canons in total: the Humfrid mentioned earlier by Muskham, who was the prior; Nicholas and Simon, who had both studied in Paris with William de Grendon, Serlo's son, known as "the cleric;" two others, whose names were forgotten; and Richard the chaplain. They built a church at considerable cost. Humfrid was credited with a journey to the Roman Curia, which brought the priory burial rights and exemption from interdict: a matter of great importance to the chronicler for whom the six years of Papal interdict during John's reign were a living memory. Benefactions began to come in, particularly from families wishing to use the church as a mortuary chapel: Muskham claims that forty ‘’milites’‘ (soldiers or knights) were buried there in this period, as well as a notable anchorite. However, discipline began to slip and the canons took to hunting in the forest. This drew the attention of the king, who compelled them to leave because they were a threat to his game. Humfrid retired to live as a hermit, while the others transferred back to Calke, leaving the priory in the hands the Grendon family. Howard Colvin dates the Augustinian cell at Deepdale to the period between 1149 and 1158. Its collapse is likely to have been 1154–8, as the king who insisted on its suppression was probably Henry II, who established several new forests.

=== Tupholme cell ===
Arms of the Premonstratensian oreder.

The next attempt to colonise Deepdale was made by a party of six canons from Tupholme Abbey in Lincolnshire, a daughter house of Newsham Abbey, the first Premonstratensian house in England. Colvin originally assigned a starting point of 1175 to the founding of the Tupholme cell at Deepdale. However, he revised this view and he and subsequent scholars accepted that Tupholme was probably founded between 1155 and 1166, which is much less neat. Muskham thought the canons from Tupholme were granted Stanley Park, although could not explain the details, and that they built a mill there. However, they found the arable land insufficient to support them, as the site was hemmed in to the south by Boyah, where Serlo de Grendon had a probably new "mansion:" the Latin original is villula, which suggests just a small house or farmstead. After seven years they were recalled and they pollarded the oaks in the park for cash before returning to Tupholme – except for Henry the Prior, who moved in with a sex worker (muliercula), with whom he was already acquainted. On the abbot's orders, Henry was retrieved by force and taken back to Tupholme, where he committed suicide by slitting his arms while in a hot bath.

=== Welbeck cell ===
A further attempt to colonise Deepdale with Premonstratensian canons was organised by William de Grendon, who procured from Welbeck Abbey in Nottinghamshire a party of five, headed by Prior William Bensyt. The chronicler places it during the Abbacy of Richard of Welbeck, who occurs from 1194 to 1224. It must have been early in his rule, in the period 1194–6. These canons too struggled with poverty and misfortune, culminating in the destruction of all their lamps which fell to the floor together while being hoisted before the altar. The abbot visited the embattled canons and found that they lacked even food and drink. He returned to Welbeck and then recalled the cell from Deepdale.

=== Establishment ===
Continental possessions of the Angevins, from 1154, shown on a map of France. William FitzRalph governed Normandy on behalf of Henry II.

The successful establishment of a religious house at Deepdale came about almost by accident. During the period of false starts, William FitzRalph, Margery's brother and Serlo de Grendon's brother-in-law, was an important figure both regionally and within the Angevin Empire. He was sheriff of Nottingham and Derby from 1168 to 1180, with Serlo de Grendon as his deputy for the last three years. From 1178 he served as Seneschal of Normandy. William had been acquiring properties to complete the dowry of his daughter Matilda, who had married Geoffrey de Salicosa. Geoffrey seems to have been a Norman knight, perhaps introduced into England by William himself: certainly he held lands in Normandy and he exchanged some with John de Wiburvile for six bovates at Ockbrook. He and Matilda, along with William FitzRalph himself, were to be regarded as the founders of Dale Abbey.

One of William's acquisitions for Matilda and Geoffrey was the township of Stanley, and the charter confirming his gift to the couple forms part of the Cartulary of Dale Abbey. However, Geoffrey and Matilda, who had been married for seven years without children, asked William to give Stanley to the Premonstratensians in order to found a house in Stanley Park. William consulted with his nephew, the clerk William de Grendon, and invited him to donate the Grendons' site at Deepdale, where the main cause of previous failures had been poverty. So the Deepdale site was not part of the initial plan, but an afterthought. The Cartulary shows that Stanley Park was actually transferred by Geoffrey and Matilda to the Premonstratensians for the projected new community, with no mention of the Deepdale site. Moreover, William FitzRalph charged Geoffrey and Matilda £100 for his "gift," presumably on the basis that it would now be alienated outside the family. The priority of the Stanley Park project in the process of establishing an abbey meant that it continued to be called the Abbey of Stanley Park, de Parco Stanley, long after Dale Abbey was a reality. William de Grendon donated the Deepdale site, along with six shillings in rents, by charter to the Stanley Park church of St Mary, for the good of his own soul and that of his brother Jordan, and his grant was confirmed by Geoffrey and Matilda. William's solicitude for the souls of his entire family — past, present and future — was to be shown by the foundation of a chantry in the "chapel of Deepdale, which they shall sustain" – probably meaning the chapel built there for the Gomme, his great-aunt, which William anticipated the canons would continue to use. In addition, in memory of the de Grendons, there was to be a daily gift of bread and beer in the refectory of the new house for distribution to the poor. A definite date associated with the foundation at Stanley would be 1 April 1196. Although an original document to support this is no longer extant, the abbey's attorney presented to quo warranto proceedings in 1331 a charter issued by Richard I on that date, giving the Premonstratensian Abbey of Stanley "all the liberties and free rights which the other abbeys of the Premonstratensian Order have in England."

William FitzRalph left his daughter and her husband to work out the details of the new foundation, pleading the urgency of the king's business overseas. The couple went to meet Abbot Lambert of Newsham or Newhouse Abbey and secured from the chapter a delegation of nine canons to establish a colony at Deepdale. Some of the founding canons are named by the chronicler: Walter de Senteney, John de Ryford, Hugh de Grimsby, Roger de Alesby, William le Sores. The Victoria County History account of Dale Abbey, edited by William Page, but written by John Charles Cox, dates this to 1195, which seems too early, while the earlier account of Newsham, also edited by Page, has Lambert occurring 1200–3, a much more plausible time frame. Colvin reckoned that the leader of the canons, Walter de Senteney, became abbot of Dale in January 1200. The date accepted for the foundation of Abbey is 15 August, the Feast of the Assumption, 1204, as reported by Bishop Richard Redman, Vicar-General of the Abbot of Prémontré, during his canonical visitation in 1478. This probably marks the founding or consecration of the new abbey church, rather than the inception of the convent itself. However, there are considerable problems with the chronology and order of events – partly because the relevant royal confirmation charters and papal bulls are missing from the cartulary – that make an entirely satisfactory account of the foundation of Dale Abbey impossible. Whenever the new community was founded, it would have been a priory initially, as the complement required for an abbey would be 12 canons and their abbot, based on the precedent of Christ and the Twelve Apostles. The 1204 date perhaps simply reflected the achievement of a steady quorum: the precise date reflects the Premonstratensian preoccupation with the Assumption of Mary, a doctrine that was not confirmed as a dogma until Pope Pius XII's definition in 1950.

== Endowments and benefactors ==
The Cartulary of Dale Abbey, containing records of grants made to it over several centuries, runs to 172 folios and forms part of a 196-page volume in the Cotton library, part of the British Library, that also contains Muskham's chronicle and a list of abbots. It consists of transcripts of about 530 deeds. The great majority date from the 13th century, with a few from the preceding century and only two that are known to be later. Information about later acquisitions comes from other sources: letters patent, for example, give considerable detail about the acquisition of land and appropriation of churches from the 14th century.

=== The founders and their children ===
In the early days valuable acquisitions continued to come from the families of William FitzRalph and Serlo de Grendon. See the family tree below to identify the relationships between these.

Family tree of founders and related benefactors

Ralph Fitz Geremund, benefactor of the hermit of Deepdale	Hawise	Roger de Grendon	Emma	Gomme of the Dale, name unknown
Edelina	William Fitz Ralph, Seneschal of Normandy and founder of Dale Abbey	Margaret	Serlo de Grendon, deputy sheriff, founder of Deepdale Priory	Richard the chaplain and canon of Deepdale
William de Tilly, died sine prole	Matilda, foundress of Dale Abbey	Geoffrey de Salicosa Mara, founder of Dale Abbey	Robert FitzRalph, Bishop of Worcester 1190—3	Geoffey de Musters	Avice	Amalric de Sablello?	Serlo de Grendon II, died sine prole	Julian	William de Grendon "the cleric," advocate or patron of the Abbey and donor of the site	Ermentrude Talbot	Bertram, canon of Dale Abbey	Agatha	Henry de Braylesford
Roger	John	Avice	William de Benniworth	Johanna	William de Poynton	Amalric de Gasci	Agnes	Robert de Muskham	Robert Wakelin	Margaret	Engenulf

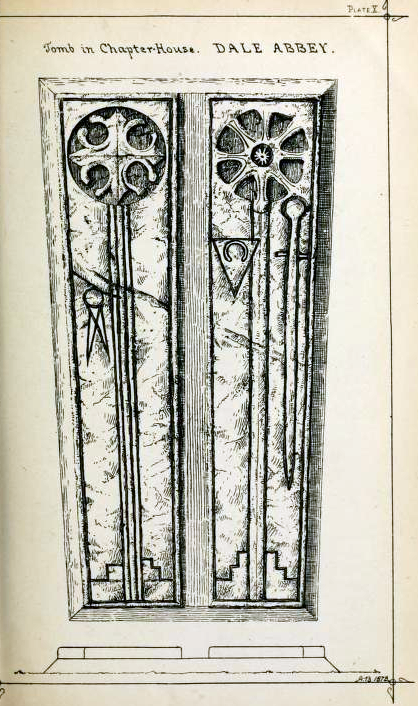
Double grave slab as rendered in report of 1878 excavations.

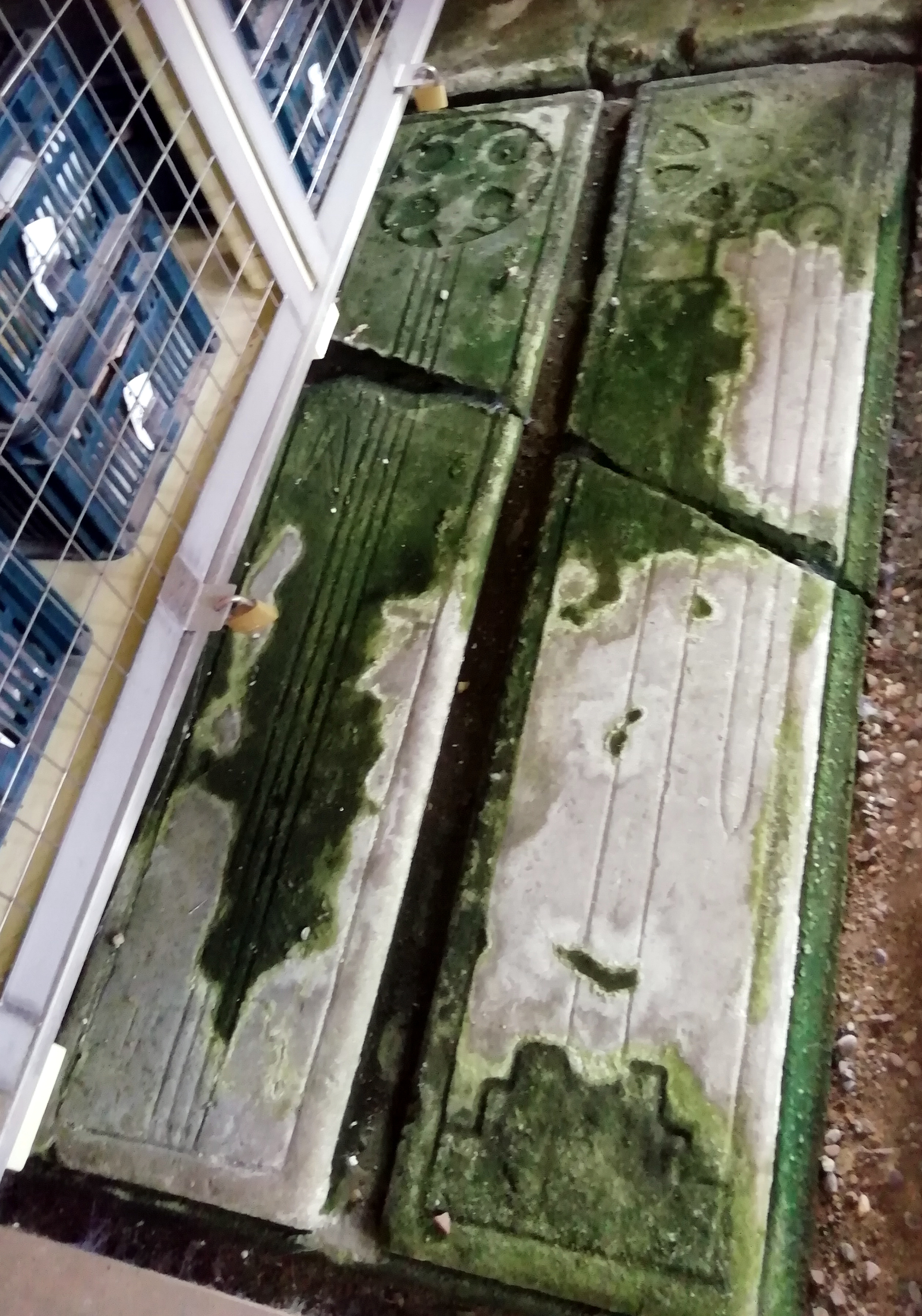
The same slab photographed in the chapter house museum, 2019.

Possibly the tomb of a married couple, donors to the abbey who were buried there. Both sides have an incised cross. One has a pair of shears, the other a sword and a shield, possibly with a horseshoe, suggesting a knightly family.

William de Grendon, described as the advocate of the abbey, contributed land from the Grendon estates at Ockbrook along with his own body and that of his brother Bertram, who became a canon of Dale Abbey. William died by 1203, when his widow Ermentrude remarried: William was presumably in minor orders, as priestly celibacy was generally accepted by this time. The six shillings in rents he gave alongside his gift of Deepdale came from the six bovates Geoffrey de Salicosa had obtained from John de Wyburville. William's brother, Serlo de Grendon II, initially gave the abbey land, including woods and pannage for 20 pigs, at Ockbrook. This grant also included his land at Boyah, just south of Deepdale, which was evidently considered vital for the abbey's prospects by the chronicler. Later he conceded all his remaining land at Ockbrook for the safety of his own soul and that of his second wife, Julian. The habit of giving was passed to the next generation. Engenulf, nephew of William, gave the abbey land at Ockbrook that he had been given by Serlo.

Geoffrey de Salicosa and Matilda made considerable additional grants to Dale Abbey. Geoffrey gave all his lands in Sandiacre as well as the six bovates in Ockbrook he had obtained in exchange for his lands in Normandy. Matilda gave her manorial lordship of Alvaston, together with meadow ans pasture there, to the abbey for the souls of herself, Geoffrey, her brother, Bishop Robert FitzRalph and other family members. She also passed on or confirmed half the mill at Borrowash. It seems that the couple left all their lands in Nottinghamshire to the abbey. If the couple hoped for a child in consideration of their gift, they were well-rewarded, as they went on to have two sons and two daughters. Geoffrey, who opposed John, King of England in the First Barons' War, died by 1229, when Matilda made an agreement with Abbot Walter to provide her with board and lodging at the abbey until her death, although she did not retire there until she was old. Roger, their son, gave Dale Abbey two bovates of land at Stanton: he died without issue, as did their other son John, leaving the daughters Avice and Johanna as joint heirs. As a widow in 1272, Johanna confirmed her husband William de Poynton's grants of land to Dale Abbey. She also gave the abbey rents from her own lands in Alvaston, Elvaston, Ambaston and Thulston. Avice also gave lands in Alvaston. Another Avice, the sister of Matilda, had married Sir Geoffrey Musters and he gave Dale Abbey half the advowson of Egginton church. By another husband she had a daughter, Agnes, who married Robert de Muskham. The de Muskham family made many grants to Dale Abbey, especially in Stanton by Dale, and the chronicler Thomas must have been a member of the family, although he does not clarify the details. Avice also had a son, Amalric, who donated the other half of the advowson of Egginton church to Dale Abbey.

=== Precarious patchworks ===
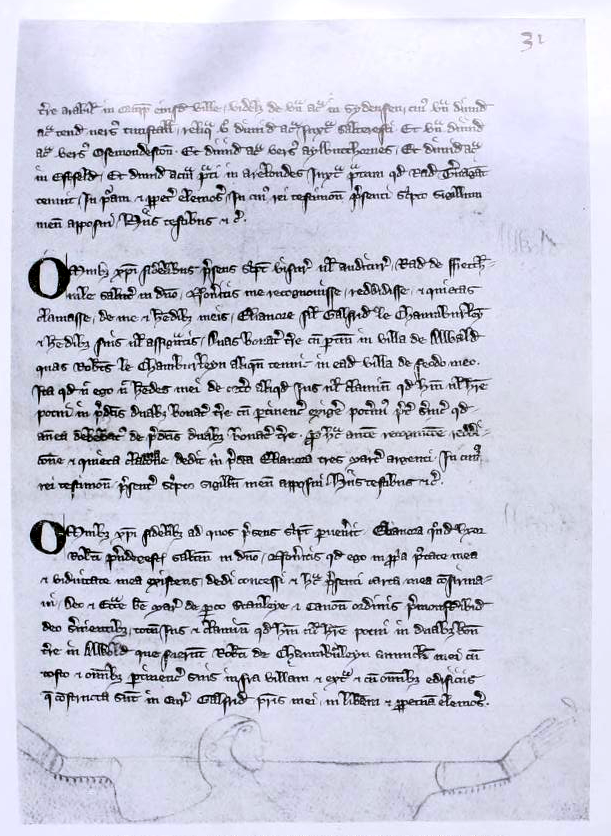
Part of the cartulary of Dale Abbey. In the middle section Ralph de Frescheville quitclaims two bovates of land at Alvaston to Eleanor, daughter of Geoffrey Chamberlain, for three marks in silver. In the lower section Eleanor grants the land to Dale Abbey.

The greater part of Dale Abbey's cartulary is made up of small grants. The estates thus formed were patchworks of land, relatively dense in some areas where granges were established, but generally interspersed by the holdings of other landholders, both secular and ecclesiastical. Frequently the abbey had to defend its holdings against the ambitions of others. However, it also invested surplus cash in the developing land market, exploiting the indebtedness of landholders, both great and small.

At Stanley, for example, there were many small grants to the abbey by local peasants and craftsmen, although the full extent is unclear as the relevant section of the cartulary is damaged. The occupation very first donor mentioned in the extant part of the chartulary, Walter Laundri is given as cementarius, stonemason: first he donated five acres, a rood and a toft for the soul of Goscelin, then a single acre, and finally he quitclaimed 6 1/2 roods. Some donations were considerably smaller. Geoffrey, son of William of Boyah, donated just half an acre each for the burial of himself and his wife, Matilda. He also committed himself to give the abbey a pound of incense each year for the Feast of the Assumption, its anniversary. The expansion of abbey's lands around Stanley led to a dispute with William de Ferrers, 4th Earl of Derby, and in 1229 a perambulation was ordered to fix the boundary with the earl's estates in Spondon.

Sandiacre was another area where Dale Abbey's lands had to be defended at law. The main landowner there at the abbey's foundation was Peter III of Sandiacre, who held five bovates at Sandiacre by a serjeanty tenure of bearing a red goshawk, probably implying he had to appear on some occasions as the king's falconer. Dale Abbey ultimately built up a portfolio of seven bovates at Sandiacre, granted by the Sandiacre family themselves or their tenants. However, legal doctrine on serjeanties was hardening in the early 13th century and there was a progressive tightening of conditions: in particular, they were pronounced inalienable and impartible. In 1205 King John launched an enquiry into serjeanties within the honour of Lancaster in order to take into his hands estates which had been alienated without royal permission. The approach was maintained into the reign of Henry III and extended to serjeanties held of the king. Five bovates at Sandiacre, granted to Dale Abbey by subtenants, were taken into royal hands. Abbot Grauncourt resolved to recover them and in 1244 obtained permission to recommence cultivating two bovates and thirty acres of the serjeanty held by Richard de Sandiacre. In 1246 he also obtained the release of Driskowe Wood, also part of the Sandiacre serjeanty originally granted to Dale Abbey by Geoffrey de Salicosa Mara when he was under-tenant. In 1250 Henry III sent out Robert Passelewe to arrent the alienated serjeanties, i.e. to convert them to forms of tenure more profitable to the Crown, and many of the lands of the Sandiacre serjeanty were thus turned into tenures that could yield rent. In 1281 the abbey's attorney responded to a quo warranto writ relating to the history of the five bovates at Sandiacre and the matter was referred to the Exchequer rolls for judgement.

Not all of the Sandiacre family's donations were at Sandiacre itself: they had considerable holdings at Kirk Hallam and other nearby locations. Around 1239 Richard of Sandiacre, Peter III's son, got into financial difficulties. In return for 30 acres in Kirk Hallam, at the excessively reasonable rent of 12 pence, payable annually on St Giles' day (1 September), the canons gave Richard 16 marks to pay his debt to David, a leading member of the Jewish community of Nottingham. The abbey took advantage of a similar situation facing Ralph of Hallam in 1260. He was forced to pledge land at Kirk Hallam to the abbey in return for 12 marks to repay a Jewish lender. However, this was not the first time Ralph had been forced into such an arrangement: although the ethnicity of the lender was not mentioned on the other occasions, Jews were the main source of credit for middling landowners in this period. H. G. Richardson provides numerous examples of religious houses acquiring land by paying debts to Jewish lenders, including that of Dale's mother house, Newsham. Richardson's study of the phenomenon was in response to a series of anti-semitic tropes rehearsed by Austin Lane Poole in his Oxford History of England volume covering the Angevin kings of England, in which he claimed, without citation or evidence, that "as usurers (the Jews) had gained a strangle-hold on the recently founded monastic houses whose splendid buildings they had financed." Richardson countered: "As for the relation of monastic houses to Jewish moneylenders, the sober facts of history show the monks as happy collaborators with them rather than as victims..." In fact, "religious houses were — to use modern phraseology — in the market for encumbered estates." Citing Richardson, Avrom Saltman suggests that Dale abbey its extend its holdings relatively cheaply by "buying up Christian debts and redeeming them probably for less than their face value." However, in modernising the language and concepts, this fails to capture Richardson's explanation, which starts from the consideration that the security provided by land was very poor as medieval conveyancing complex and cumbersome, and so very expensive and uncertain, giving the lender no easy path to transfer title in encumbered land to a potential purchaser. This was especially true for a Jew, as it was questionable whether he or she could have property in land, and so act as an intermediary in the process: there are a few instances of Jews holding lands in fee but it was inconvenient, possibly dangerous, for a lender to do so. The involvement of a cash-rich abbey could greatly improve the position for both lender and borrower, providing much greater security and bringing down the claim by perhaps 40%, as it did in some pursued by Aaron of Lincoln. The deal could only be watertight if the monastery had a written agreement from the debtor to hand over his land and had secured effective possession or seisin in advance. The Kirk Hallam charters provide Dale with this. It was no accident when a monastery acquired several encumbered estates in the same area by buying out the claims of Jewish lenders: monasteries actively pursued a policy of expanding their holdings by this method. This seems to be the case with Dale Abbey at Kirk Hallam, where lender, borrower and abbey all benefited from the arrangement. The original landholders were free of their debts, but would now pay rent to the abbey for the land they were still able to cultivate or exploit in other ways.

In the years immediately after its foundation, the Muskams were very prominent among the benefactors of Dale Abbey. Some of the lands derived from them were close to the abbey. 14 bovates at Little Hallam, east of Kirk Hallam, were donated by Nicholas de Chavencurt for his own soul and the souls of, among others, his wife Gundred, his father-in-law Guy de Vere, and his uncle Robert de Muskham. This land had originally come from the Muskham family in a marriage settlement two generations earlier. The family made a considerable number of donations around eponymous North Muskham, South Muskham, as well as nearby Bathley, and also confirmed grants by their subtenants, the Bathley family. It seems that William of Southwell, a cleric and possibly a kinsman of Abbot Grauncourt, actively sought out likely donors for the abbey along the Nottinghamshire border with Lincolnshire - small landowners beneath the attention of most money lenders. A typical deal was William of Bathley's transfer of five acres and three roods, "for a certain sum of money, which he (William of Southwell) gave me in my necessity beforehand" - pro quadam summa pecunie quam in necessitate mea mihi dedit pre manibus. William of Southwell was enfeoffed with the land, for the service of a single rose. His relationship to Dale Abbey seems to have been similar to that of the Nottingham Jewish community, allowing it to purchase encumbered estates at competitive prices, although William had an advantage over Jewish lenders in that he could hold the lands in fee during the transition period before selling to the abbey. As with the acquisitions from Jewish lenders, the original landholders were not displaced but compelled to pay rent to the abbey for their land. Here too there was no accident in the pattern of acquisitions: William was buying up land in bulk to a predetermined plan. At one point he had made an agreement with the abbot and convent of Dale to buy up forty acres at ten shillings per acre, with a provision for a discount if the acreage was found deficient. In the only recorded example of a price paid by William, it is the same as his regular selling price, suggesting that any reward for William must have been in the form of a retainer or salary.

=== Later acquisitions ===
The Statutes of Mortmain made acquisition of lands in the 14th century complex and expensive. A series of transaction beginning in 1323 illustrate this. On 7 December Edward II, at nearby Belper, issued a licence for Dale Abbey to acquire land and rents up to the value of 100 shillings, or £5. There would have been a charge for the permission, not recorded, and there had also been an expensive inquest ad quod damnum to ascertain the precise damage to royal interests that might result from the purchases. Nothing further is recorded until almost twenty years later, when, in July 1343, Edward III licensed the acquisition of land and houses to the value of 5s. 2d. at Hopton and Stanton by Dale, but counted them as 10 shillings against the allowed total of 100s. Not until 1392, under Richard II, was this group of acquisitions completed, with the transfer of 113 acres in total by two chaplains. Meanwhile, Edward III had in 1363 granted a licence for the abbey to acquire land and rents up to an annual value of £20, on condition that the canons mention him every day in prayers, masses and chapter meetings. Richard II's administration, in 1382, took 4 marks (£2.67) off the total allowed the abbey for only 16 shillings (£0.80) in actual acquisitions. The following year £10 was subtracted from the allowance for only 50 shillings (£2.50) in land and rents. Nothing further is heard of this allowance, so the abbey had managed to add only 66 shillings (£3.30) worth of land and rents, having paid for the right to acquire £20. Similarly Edward III's 1365 licence to acquire docking and warehouse facilities in Derby worth 60s. led in 1375 to the purchase of a building worth 10s., although with 13s. 4d. subtracted from the allowance and apparently no further acquisitions. In each case the original licence was pronounced or considered "satisfied" before the allowance had in fact been exhausted, even with the king's inflated estimate of their worth. The latter was probably to counterbalance the tendency of abbeys to undervalue their lands, but in fact encouraged it.

=== Controlled churches ===
==== Egginton ====
The patronage of Egginton church was not accompanied by the tithes. It seems that there were soon challenges to the abbey's right to nominate the rector from other landowners. The greater part of the manor had come into the hands of Richard de Grendon. His widow, Ermentrude, passed it on to her daughter, Margaret, on her marriage to Robert Wakelin. Their daughters and joint heirs, Ermentrude and Margaret, married into the Stafford and Chandos families. The Staffords seem to have litigated to obtain the advowson and succeeded in getting half of it. The last presentation to the other half by an abbot of Dale was in 1344. In the following year, Roger Northburgh, Bishop of Coventry and Lichfield, appropriated the tithes of half the church to the abbot of Dale and his 24 "monks," perhaps as a gesture of recompense. The royal licence for this was issued on 2 August.

==== Kirk Hallam ====
Kirk Hallam church was another that the abbey acquired early in its history. Richard of Sandiacre gave the patronage of the church, as well as a toft, a quarry site and some land. Subsequently, the de Sandiacre, their tenants and other smaller landholders contributed to a considerable portfolio of land for the abbey in Kirk Hallam. Although the de Sandiacre grant was only of the advowson of the rectory, by 1298 it had appropriated the church, demoting the benefice to a vicarage, with the great tithe going to the abbey. It seems that the abbey also obtained exemption from papal taxation from the church, as it does not appear in the Taxatio Ecclesiastica of 1291–2.

==== Stanton by Dale ====
The church at nearby Stanton by Dale was also omitted by the Taxatio and is not even mentioned in the Valor Ecclesiasticus of 1535, which paved the way for the Dissolution of the Monasteries, or in the records of the local Diocese of Lichfield and Coventry. In this case there was not even a vicarage, as it is possible the church was entirely a creation of Dale Abbey itself, so both the advowson and the tithes had always belonged to the abbey.

==== Trowell ====
Robert Thoroton reported that in the mid-13th century Dale Abbey was given a moiety of the advowson of Trowell church by William de Trowell, along with all the rents and lands his father Richard had held in Trowell, although the tithes were not included.

==== Greasley ====
The advowson of the church at Greasley, Nottinghamshire, and rents at Greasley, amounting to 100 shillings, were granted in frankalmoin to Dale by Nicholas de Cantilupe under a licence issued on 11 March 1337. Nicholas de Cantilupe held the manor and advowson of Ilkeston, as well as Greasley, through the marriage of his grandfather, also Nicholas, to Eustachia de Greasley, heiress of Hugh de Greasley. The condition for the grants at Greasley was that the canons of Dale establish and conduct a chantry for Nicholas and his family not at Dale Abbey itself but in Ilkeston church.

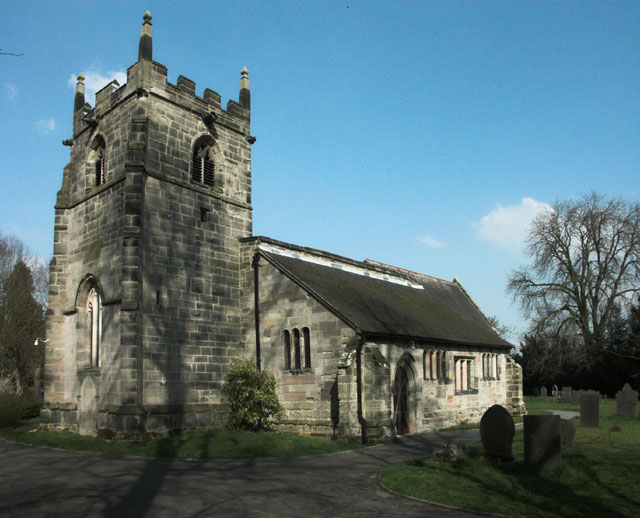
St Wilfrid's Church, Egginton. A building dating back to about 1300 but with work from several centuries.

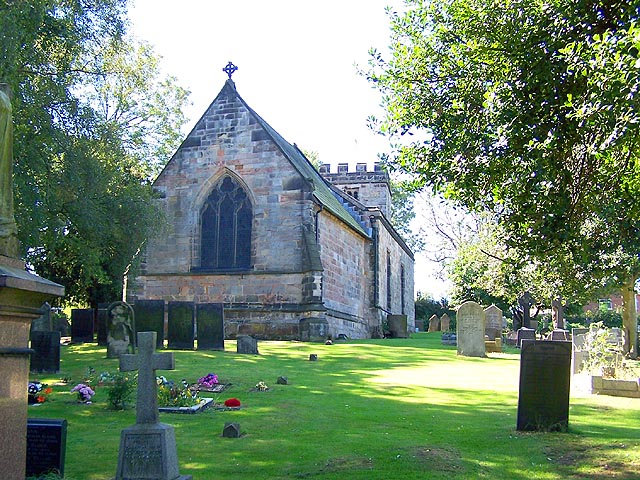
Church of All Saints, Kirk Hallam, a 14th–15th-century building, heavily restored in Victorian period.

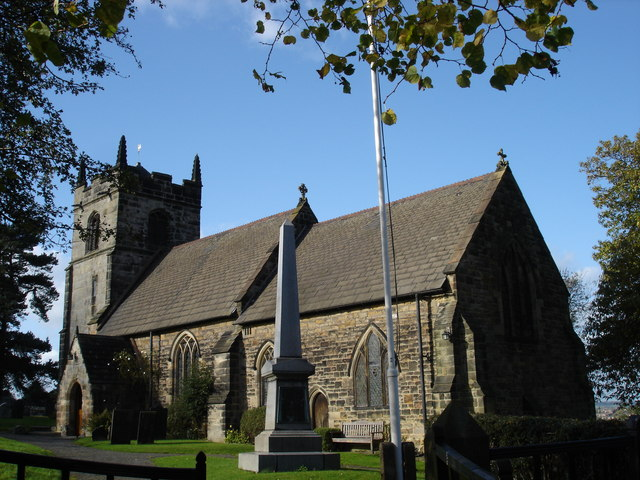
Church of St Michael and All Angels, Stanton by Dale.

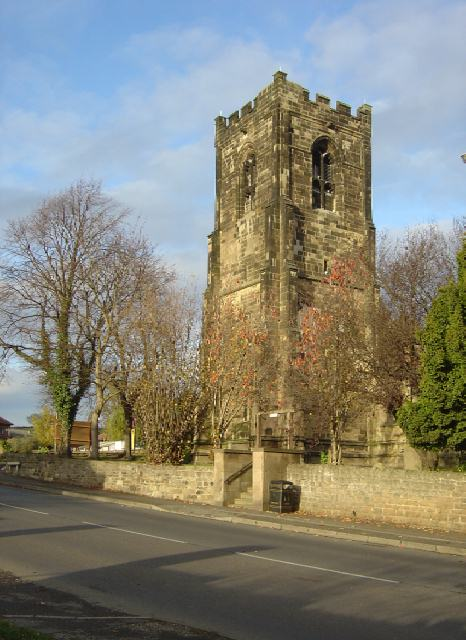
St Helen's Church Trowell, 13–15th-century building with Victorian restoration.

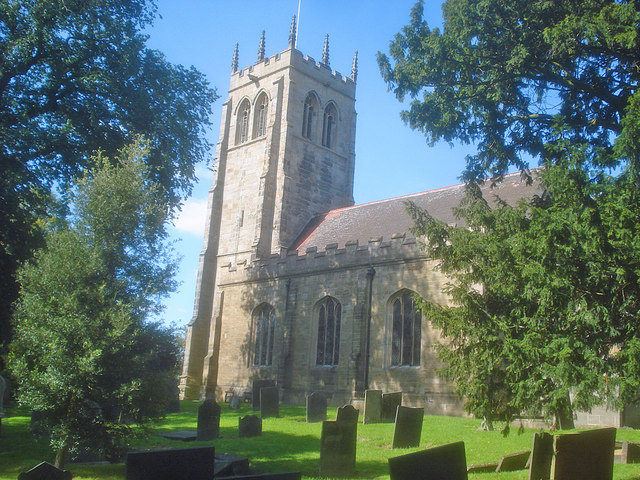
St Mary's Church, Greasley: a much-restored 15th-century church.

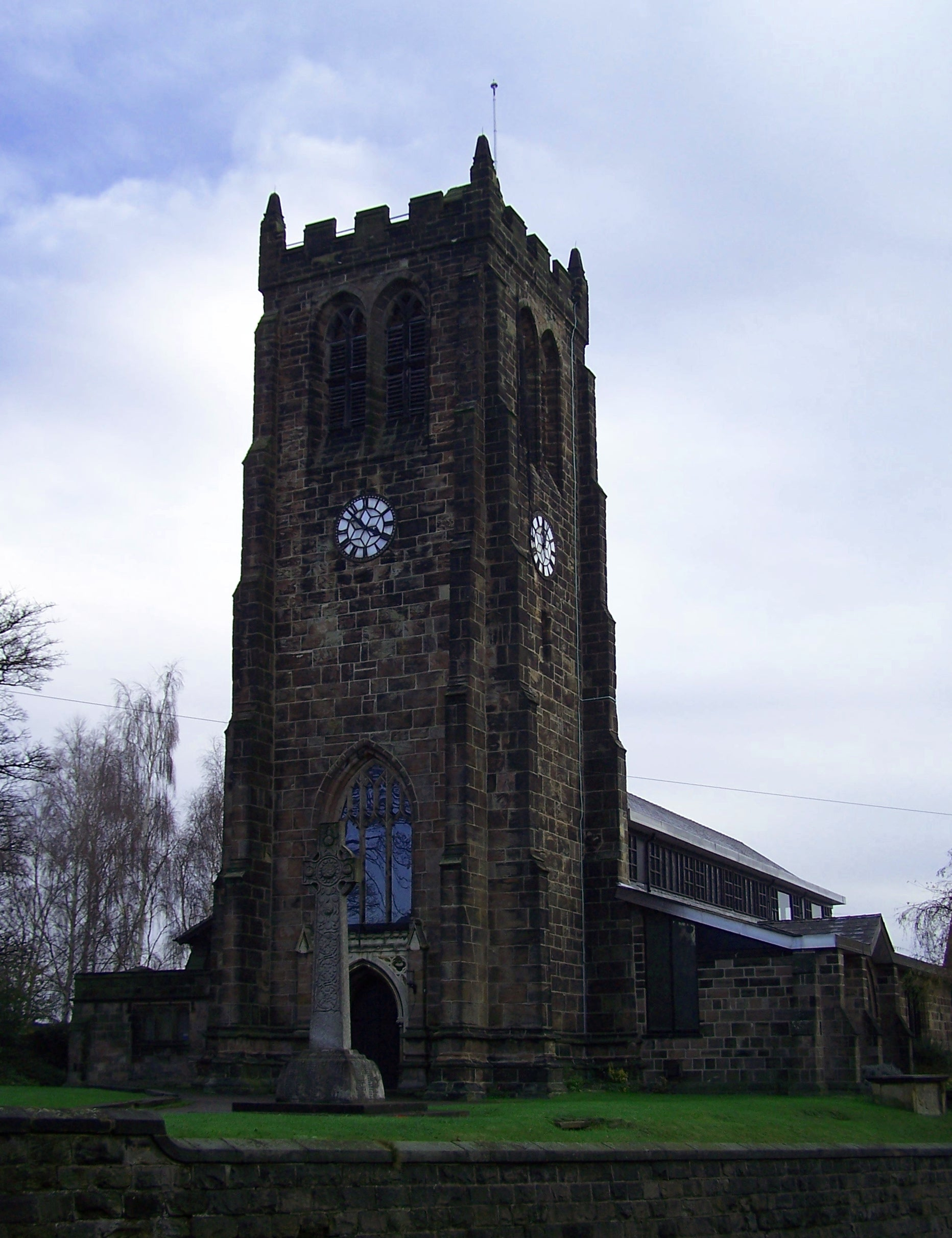
St Lawrence's Church, Heanor. Despite substantial rebuilding as late as the 1980s, it retains its perpendicular 15th-century tower.

==== Ilkeston ====
The other churches acquired by Dale came considerably later and show how much more awkward such gifts became as political and legal circumstances changed. On 12 July 1385, Richard II granted a licence for Hugh de Willoughby, a cleric, and five others, to alienate to Dale Abbey in mortmain the advowson of Ilkeston church, and also for the abbey to appropriate the church. The apparent donors were actually a group of feoffees employed by William la Zouche, 3rd Baron Zouche, whose father had inherited it from the Cantelupe family, the former manorial lords: such arrangements were often used to by-pass the restrictive provisions of the Statutes of Mortmain. Earlier, on 13 February William la Zouche had secured the benefits of his gift: chantry masses and prayers at Dale Abbey for himself and his wife, Agnes, as well as for their parents and for William de Clinton, 1st Earl of Huntingdon and his wife Juliana de Leybourne. On 12 October he confirmed the transfer of the church, releasing it to the Abbey of "La Dale."

The abbey held Ilkeston church for less than a decade before its rights were temporarily overridden by Pope Boniface IX, who in 1394 imposed on the parish John de Aston, formerly vicar of Colston Bassett, noting that the vicarage was worth 40 marks. The church already had a vicar, a canon of Dale called Hugo of Thurgarton. Moreover, the papal presentation was against the Statute of Provisors: for this and for vexatious litigation against the abbot and convent of Dale, Aston was incarcerated in the Fleet Prison, from which the king released him on 20 February 1398, as he had mainprise. Aston then seized Ilkeston church with Henry, a chaplain, and six others. Bishop John Burghill wrote to the king requesting secular intervention. It seems that the gang were called before the bench of magistrates, as one who failed to appear, John Wylchar, another chaplain, was pardoned in October 1402, after handing himself in at the Marshalsea Prison.

==== Heanor ====
The church at Heanor was transferred to Dale Abbey via feoffees in the reign of Edward IV. The advowson was actually held by Henry Grey, 4th Baron Grey of Codnor, who was at this time the key local figure in the Yorkist faction built by Lord Hastings, which supported the king in his conflict with his brother, George, Duke of Clarence. Grey is not mentioned in either of the two permissions authorised by the king, the first of which was granted at Nottingham on 11 September 1473. Instead Grey sanctified and advertised the solidarity and loyalty of the ruling group and its local allies by including in his list of feoffees John Hales, Bishop of Coventry and Lichfield; Hastings himself; Lord Thomas Stanley, a Lancashire magnate and titular King of Mann, active in Derbyshire politics and sometime justice of the peace in the county; the brother of Thomas; another brother, James Stanley, later Archdeacon of Chester; Sir Thomas Burgh, a close friend of the king; the abbot of Rufford Abbey, named as William; and a number of politically active Derbyshire gentry, including Ralph Sacheverell and Henry Statham, linked by the ill-fated marriage of their son and daughter respectively, William Babington and John Staunton. The terms of the licence demanded that the abbey set aside enough from the proceeds of Heanor church to pay both for a perpetual vicarage, i.e. a priest with a regular income, and for an annual distribution of alms to the local poor, but no fee for the licence is mentioned. The preamble to king's second licence, issued at Westminster on 10 February 1475, makes clear that it was granted only after further negotiations in which the king had wrung major concessions from the abbey. The abbot of Dale, John Stanley (probably from the local village of Stanley and not related to the Lancashire brothers), had agreed to give to the king land at Larkdale, just north of Nottingham, which Edward wanted to include in a new park centred on Nottingham Castle, so that he and his family could hunt while in residence there.

Location of church	Name/Dedication	Dates	Donor	Approximate coordinates
Egginton	St Wilfrid	Both moieties of the advowson acquired in the 13th century but lost by 1344. Half the rectory appropriated 1345: royal licence 2 August.	Roger Northburgh	52°50′51″N 1°36′15″W
Kirk Hallam	All Saints	Advowson acquired early 13th century. Appropriated by 1298.	Richard of Sandiacre	52°57′37″N 1°19′08″W
Stanton by Dale	St Michael and All Angels	Probably founded by Dale Abbey during the 13th century. Advowson and tithes always belonged to the abbey.		52°56′19″N 1°18′36″W
Trowell	St Helen	Moiety of advowson acquired mid-13th century.	William de Trowell	52°57′10″N 1°16′53″W
Greasley	St Mary	Advowson acquired under a licence of 11 March 1337.	Nicholas de Cantilupe	53°01′11″N 1°16′19″W
Ilkeston	St Mary	Licence of 12 July 1385 provided for transfer of advowson and appropriation.	William la Zouche, 3rd Baron Zouche	52°58′15″N 1°18′33″W
Heanor	St Lawrence	Licence issued 10 February 1475 permitted transfer of advowson and appropriation, in return for a piece of land at Nottingham belonging to Dale Abbey, which the king wanted as part of a new park.	Henry Grey, 4th Baron Grey of Codnor	53°00′49″N 1°21′06″W

== Economy ==
=== Sources of income ===
In the Taxatio Ecclesiastica, a survey of Church property commissioned by Pope Nicholas IV in 1291, the holdings of Dale Abbey had a total annual value of £54 17s. 2d. The bulk of this came from lands donated early after the foundation by the families of William FitzRalph and Serlo de Grendon. It was made up of many small amounts, with significant differences in sources between the various area. So the sale of stock from Boyah, south of the abbey, came to the considerable sum of £6 4s. 6d., while the land around the abbey itself brought in only 14s. 4d. from stock. Stanley brought in £4 13s. 4d. in rents and £3 in stock sales, with only 10s. from the manorial court. At Borrowash the mill was worth £1 and the fishery, presumably from the mill pond, 4s. The abbey seems to have drawn a large proportion of its income ultimately from stock rearing: even when its revenue came from rents, the tenants would have been making their money mainly from sheep and cattle. When the estates were resold after the dissolution in 1543, they were estimated at 24,000 acres, of which only 3,000, or one eighth, was "land", i.e. arable land, and the rest pasture, meadow, open land, etc. In 1347 the abbot of Dale was among a large number of churchmen — five of them in Derbyshire — who were asked to make a loan to the king in the form of wool, as a subsidy towards the war in France, suggesting that Dale was one of the houses known to produce wool, the most important commodity of international trade, in considerable amounts.

The Valor Ecclesiasticus of 1535 valued Dale Abbey at £144 12s. About a fifth of the income was made up of revenues from churches in the final years. Heanor alone was bringing in £13 according to the accounts of the Court of Augmentations in 1540.

=== List of granges ===
The lands granted to Dale Abbey allowed it to establish a number of granges: centres of cultivation under the direct control of the abbey. The table below lists the granges named by Howard Colvin in a 1939 study.

Name/location of grange	Notes	Approximate coordinates
Stanley grange	The founding of the abbey was implicit in the transfer of substantial estates at Stanley from William Fitz Ralph to Geoffrey and Matilda de Salicosa Mara and many of the earliest deeds in the cartulary are transfers of lands at Stanley. Excavations in 1997 uncovered eight iron smelting furnaces at the grange, apparently designed to take advantage of the prevailing west wind. Archaeomagnetic dating showed the furnaces were used between 1220 and 1315. The first mention of Stanley as a grange is in connection with Abbot William Horsley(1332-1354), who was remembered for adding a stone chamber to the building. Abbot John Stanley retired here after resigning in 1491, as did Abbot Bebe after the dissolution. In the 17th century it was used as a Catholic seminary.	52°57′38″N 1°22′04″W
Boyah grange	Perhaps the site of a temporary farmstead of the Grendon family. Serlo de Grendon I donated all his land at Boyah to the canons of Deepdale around 1160, probably during the days of the first, Augustinian cell from Calke. First mention of a grange is a Quitclaim deed of Richard de Grey, dated 1289—98 by Saltman, which mentions that Abbot Laurence ploughed and sowed propius grangiam de Boyagh, "nearer to the grange of Boyah."	52°56′18″N 1°20′30″W
Ockbrook or Littlehay Grange	"Ockbroke Graunge" is not mentioned until the dissolution of Dale Abbey, when the inventory lists the quantities of rye, barley, peas and hay in its barns and malt house. It is mentioned again after dissolution as one of the properties sold to Francis Pole. It appears under the name Little Hall Grange in 1562, when it was held by Thomas Stanhope.	52°55′49″N 1°21′31″W
Ambaston Grange	Both Dale Abbey and Darley Abbey had holdings scattered all over Alvaston, often from the same donors. The ′′Taxatio′′ confirms that Dale had a grange in Alvaston but there were two: Thulston and Ambaston. The latter most probably belonged to Dale, in view of the distribution of its holdings.	52°52′56″N 1°21′22″W
Gosewonge or Bathley Grange	Dale Abbey had a large number of small holdings in Bathley and North Muskham and South Muskham. The grange must date from the 13th century, as three deeds in the cartulary specifically mention the grange of Gosewong, These are quitclaims by different people, so the original donor of the site is unknown. By 1553 the place was known simply as Bathley Grange and the tenant was William Bassett.	53°07′24″N 0°50′13″W
Griffe Grange	Griffe was listed among the demesnes of Dale Abbey in a charter of Edward I, 1294, granting free warren, i.e. liberty to take small game. By the dissolution it was leased to Ralph Gell. Griffe Grange is now a locality name marked on OS maps.	53°06′14″N 1°37′28″W
Southome Grange	Although the name is attested in several contexts, the precise location of the grange is not known. It was certainly in the village of Dale Abbey. It was one of the Dale properties handed over to Francis Pole in 1540.	Position unknown. Presumed at the southern end of Dale village. 52°56′38″N 1°21′04″W

=== Mills ===
Watermills played an important part in the abbey's economy and were stoutly defended when under threat. The mill built at Stanley by the second Deepdale priory (after 1175) continued in use for centuries, well beyond the dissolution of the abbey, and was known as Parke Mill in the 16th century, later as Baldock Mill. The Taxatio of 1291 records two mills at Stanley. Richard of Sandiacre gave the abbey a mill at Kirk Hallam. Grants involving a half share of a mill at Bathley show some of the wide range of rights and sources of profit that stemmed from a mill: suit of the tenants compelled them to use the mill;multure made them pay for having their corn ground, generally as a proportion of the flour produced; labour services from villeins dealt with maintenance of mills and millponds; valuable fishing rights in the ponds could either feed the canons or provide an income stream.

The cartulary contains Peter Picot's grant to William de Grendon of a mill at Borrowash, together with the alders on the island of Borrowash for repairs to the mill pond, at an annual rent of two shillings: this seems to be a mill subsequently granted by William to Dale Abbey Abbot Simon seems to have carried out a substantial and rapid building programme on the River Derwent at Borrowash, constructing nine new mills in the first year of his abbacy. This led to legal proceedings by Sir Thomas Bardulph, which came to a head at the assizes in Derby on 29 April 1269. For a consideration of 45 marks, Sir Thomas quitclaimed any right to the mills and their sites and also promised to levy a fine of lands to tidy up outstanding matters when Abbot Simon, who was ill, either recovered or was succeeded by a new abbot.

The Borrowash mills also threatened the interests of the merchants of Derby, who complained in 1276 that the abbot of Dale and the Bishop of Chester had obstructed their river, contrary to the terms of charters granted by John and Henry III. The dispute was protracted and in 1281 twelve men of Derby alleged that the Derwent, so clear in the time of John that ships regularly came to trade foodstuffs and other goods at Derby, was now unnavigable because of the abbot's weirs at Borrowash. In 1283, however, the mills were at the centre of an eruption of violence. The Order of Saint Lazarus, a military order whose English base was at Burton Lazars in Leicestershire, had been expanding its holdings around Spondon where it held the advowson of the church, and was soon to appropriate it. The order was acquiring lands particularly at Chaddesden, Locko and Borrowash. It seems that the Lazarites occupied one of Dale Abbey's mills in pursuit of a property dispute. In response, a force of at least a hundred armed men headed by Abbot Laurence himself and two future abbots, Richard of Normanton and John of Lincoln, assaulted the Lazarites, as their master complained to Edward I, who issued a commission of oyer and terminer from Conwy on 18 March. The result of the inquiry is not known.

=== Retreat from the demesnes ===
In common with most religious houses and secular landholders, Dale Abbey seems to have largely ceased to cultivate its demesnes. This must have been accelerated by the demographic crises of the 14th century, particularly the Great Famine of 1315–1317 and the Black Death, which depressed land values and gave labour a scarcity value. A few leasing agreements made by the abbey survive. Among them is a 1404 lease of land and a house at Lamcote, near Radcliffe-on-Trent, to the Thuryff family. This was agreed, in keeping with tradition, on Lady Day and the rent was 20 shillings. The abbey promised to supply timber to help keep the buildings in good repair on condition that the tenants would arrange for its transport beyond Nottingham and supply the labour. On 7 April 1538, in the final year of the abbey, a close at Stanton by Dale, next to the common moor and called "the Condith felde," was leased to John Dylke for 26s. 8d. (two marks). The Court of Augmentations described the revenues from every estate, including the granges it valued, as either a redditus (something rendered, rent) or firma (farm), both indicating some kind of leasing arrangement. However, the granges of Boyah and Ockbrook are not listed with the others but do appear on the inventory taken on the day of the dissolution. The livestock and foodstuffs they contained were itemised and sold with those from the monastery itself, suggesting that their cultivation was still controlled by the canons themselves, as a ready source of food for their own refectory.

== Abbots of Dale ==
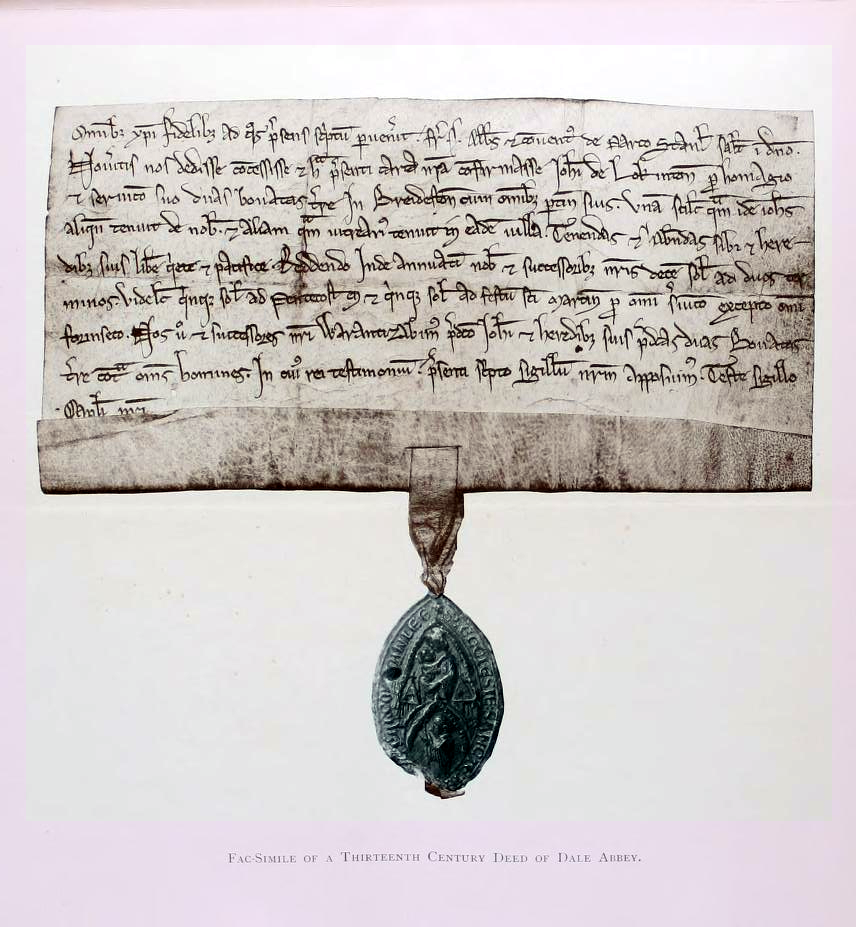
A deed and seal of Dale Abbey. The seal bears the inscription: S. Ecclesie Sancte Marie de Parco Stanlee, enclosing a half-length Madonna and Child with a half-length abbot praying beneath a trefoiled arch.

The abbots of Dale could have considerable impact on the wider Premonstratensian order in England and were political figures of some significance.

=== Abbatial elections ===
Only one full account exists of an election of an abbot at Dale. As Newsham Abbey was the mother house of Dale Abbey, elections took place under the auspices of its abbot and in the presence of his deputies. A detailed account was put on record of an election held at Dale in 1332, when the representatives of Newsham were the abbots of Langdon and Halesowen. This was the second election of the year, as the elderly John of Horsley had resigned in May and his successor, John Woodhouse, had resigned after only 15 weeks. After celebrating the Mass of the Holy Spirit, the two abbots and the canons of Dale retired to the chapter house, where a warning was read that all excommunicates should leave the room. The Holy Spirit was invoked and the election proceeded per viam compromissi — by way of compromission: the delegation of the choice to a panel selected by the chapter. The canons unanimously selected Walter of Tickhill, their prior, Thomas of Tickhill, the sub-prior, Robert of Barton, Simon of Bredon, and William of Horsley. Their mandate allowed them to choose the new abbot from among themselves, from among the other canons, or from any other Premonstratensian house. They were to delegate one of their number to announce the decision and the whole chapter swore to accept it. The five delegates went into private discussion and at length sent William of Horsley out of the room so that they could discuss his suitability in his absence. Finally they elected him "as a provident man, and as one most circumspect in things spiritual and temporal." They then mandated Thomas of Tickhill to introduce William to the chapter as their new abbot. This he did, requesting the two abbots present to ratify their decision. Once they had made due enquiries about William, they confirmed his election and certified that the canonical forms had been observed. The chapter then celebrated William's election by chanting the Te Deum as they conducted him to the abbey church. There he was installed in office by placing in his hands the bell ropes of the church and seating him in the abbot's stall. Back in the chapter house he received the abbot's seal and each of the canons professed his obedience.

=== Abbots of Dale within the Order ===
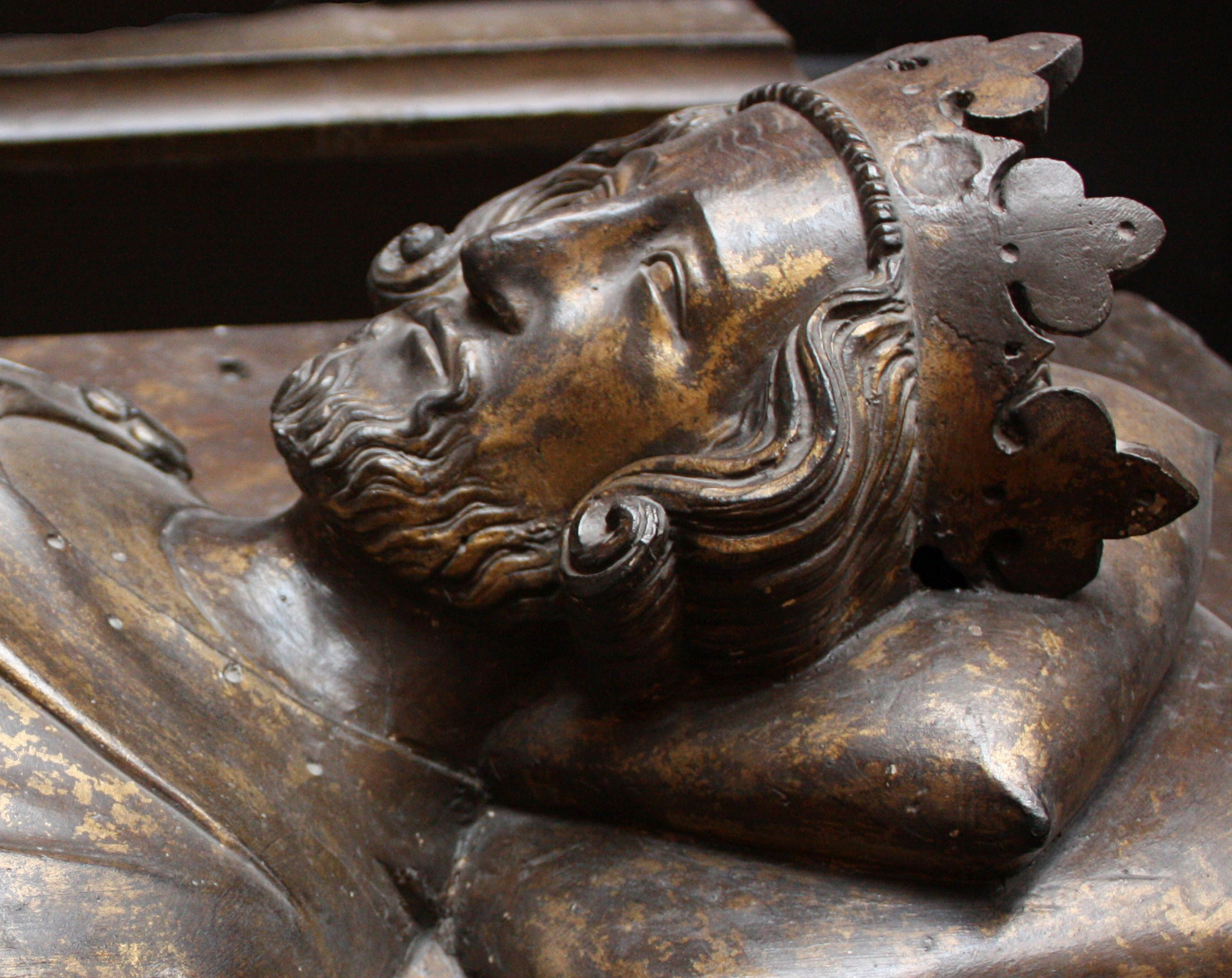
Effigy of Henry III in Westminster Abbey

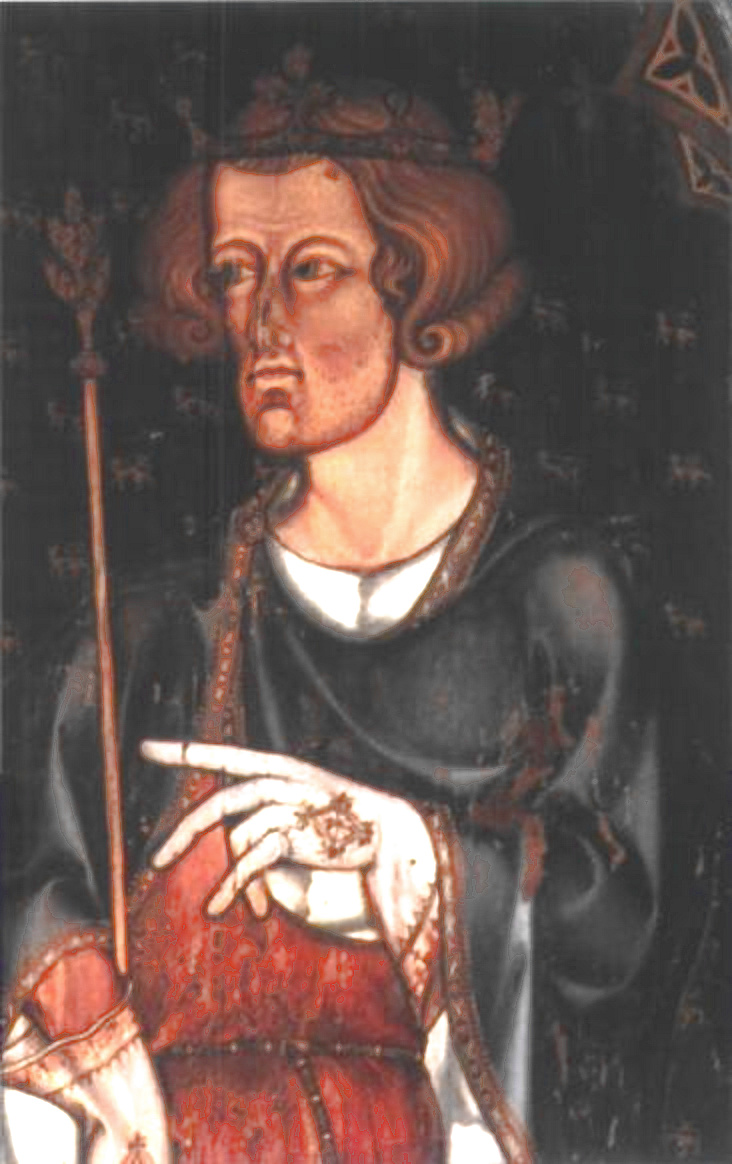
Portrait in Westminster Abbey, thought to be of Edward I

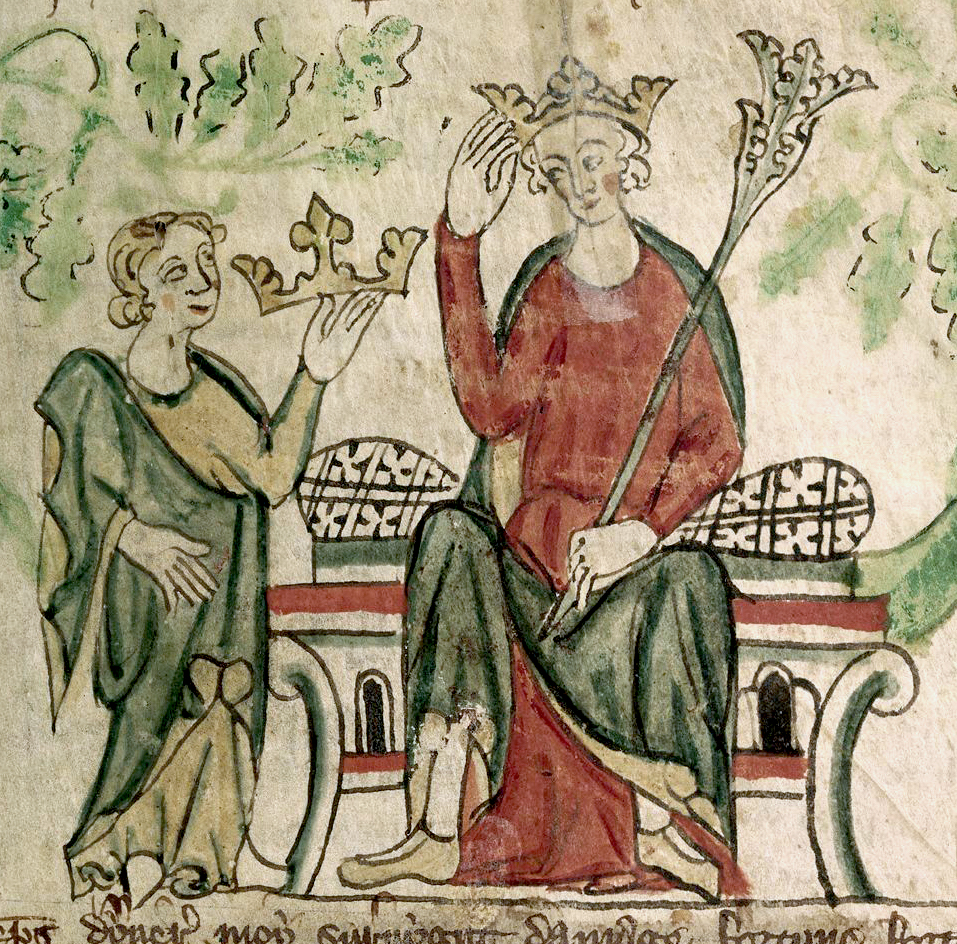
Contemporary depiction of Edward II's coronation.

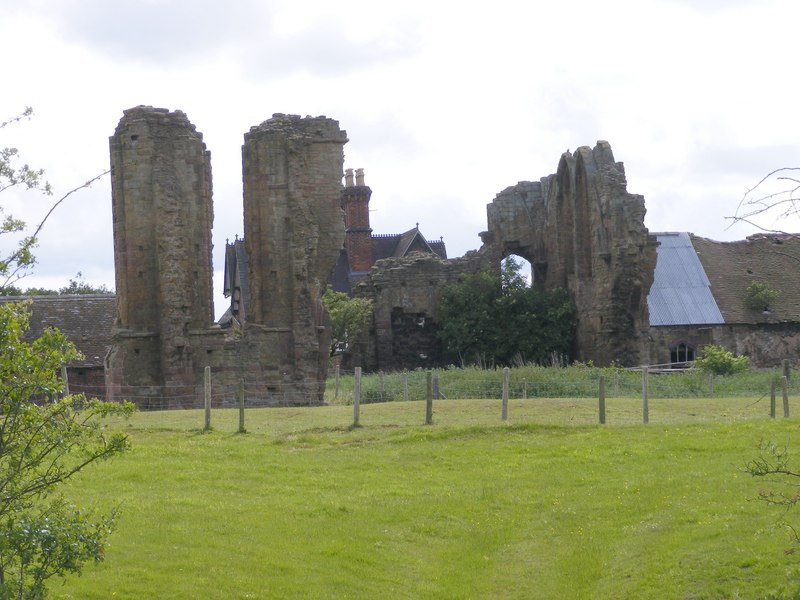
Halesowen Abbey, a Premonstratensian house in the Midlands.

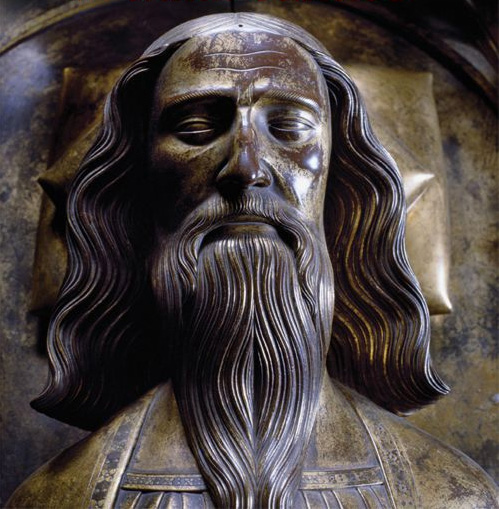
Effigy of Edward III from his tomb in Westminster Abbey

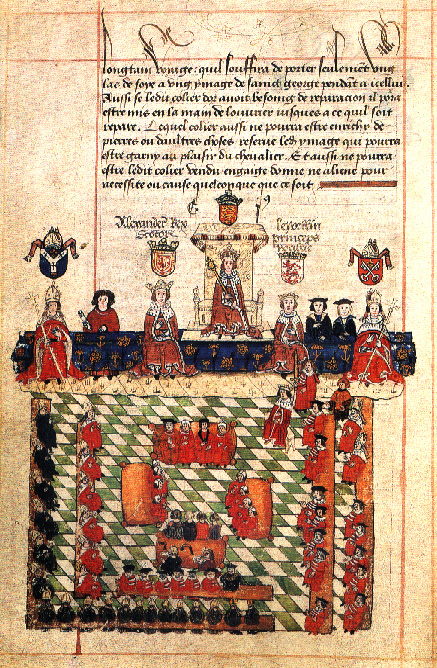
A medieval parliament

Coat of arms of John of Gaunt asserting his claim to the throne of Castile and León. Thomas Foljambe was attorney for Derbyshire gentry who fought in his Iberian campaigns.

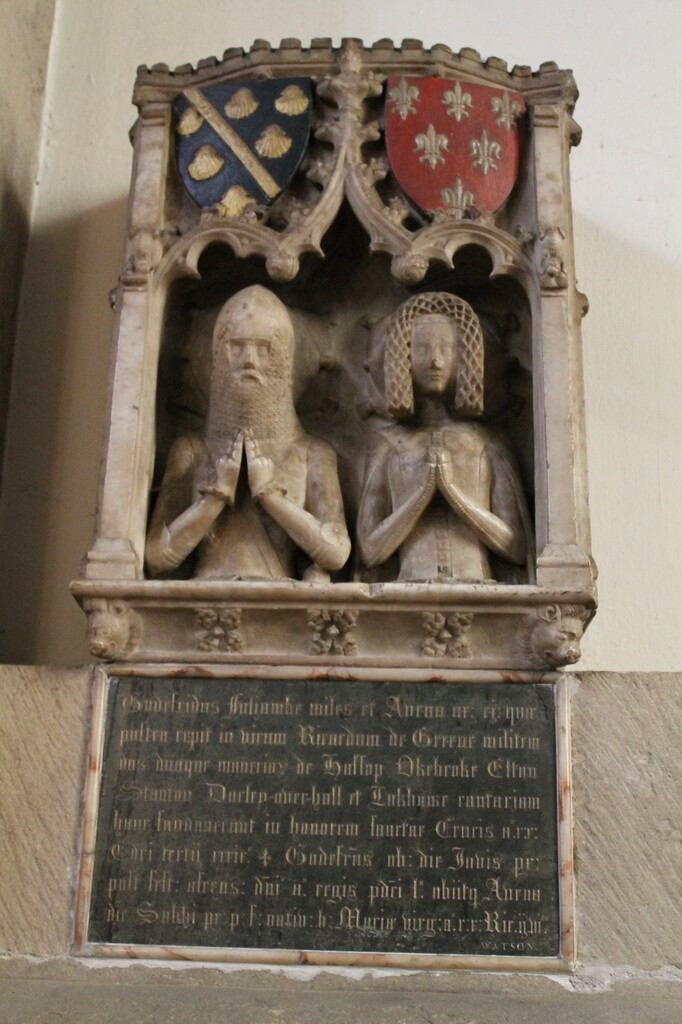
The Foljambe monument in All Saints' Church, Bakewell

Dale's abbots had a defined, nuanced rôle within the hierarchy of the Premonstratensian or Norbertine order. As Dale was a daughter house of Newsham, it was subject to canonical visitation and correction by the abbot of the mother house. However, abbots of Dale were sometimes asked to accompany the abbots of Newsham and Welbeck in their ministry. In 1450, for example, the abbot of Dale, John Spondon, went with the abbot of Newsham to supervise an abbatial election at Welbeck. The canons decided not to exercise their right of election and asked the two abbots to make an appointment for them. In July 1515 Abbot Richard Nottingham of Dale appended his seal to the election of Edmund Green as abbot of Halesowen Abbey, signifying that he had assisted the abbot of Welbeck at the election and approved the result.

Within the order as a whole, Dale was autonomous' represented by its own abbot not only in the provincial chapter, which regulated the affairs of the order in England, but also at the general chapter held at Prémontré Abbey in north-eastern France. Dale's abbots might serve on steering committee, the diffinitores, that did the real work of the provincial chapters, as did John Stanley at a chapter held at Leicester in 1479, and Richard Nottingham at Lincoln in 1495.

Some abbots of Dale had a wider impact on the order. Most prominent was Abbot William, who served at Dale for two and a half years before being elected abbot of Prémontré, and thus head of the whole order, in October 1233. Although widely regarded as a prudent man, he proved an austere reformer: the chronicle of Dunstable Priory remarks in eodem capitulo ardua plurima sunt statuta — "in that chapter there were many rigorous statutes." He quickly ruffled feathers in the order, carrying out a visitation of the Italian abbeys and proposing to change the dress of the lay brothers, and was forced to retire, amid general discord, to Bayham Abbey.

Abbot John of Horsley is known to have played a very active part in the affairs of the English Premonstratensians. About 1309 he was by asked by Abbot Adam of Prémontré to intervene in a problem at Egglestone Abbey in County Durham, where the canons were refusing to accommodate or support their retired abbot, William. He was to reconcile William with the convent of Egglestone or find a suitable home for him in another abbey. John wrote to the abbot of Easby or St Agatha's, near Richmond in Yorkshire, asking him to take on the case, as he had important business to transact for Dale in the presence of Walter Langton, bishop of Coventry and Lichfield. However, he was politely rebuffed. It seems he then instructed Welbeck Abbey to make arrangements for William's accommodation, as he soon also received a letter from the abbot of Welbeck, incensed at what he considered the threatening and cajoling tone of John's messenger. He pointed out that Egglestone was already in the process of mounting an appeal, so that he would be left footing the bill if William were accommodated in his abbey. John replied that his canon had not exceeded his powers, as his mandate came from the head of the order, and he made clear that he was prepared to stand his ground. The matter dragged on for some years and was finally resolved when Abbot Adam gave plenary powers to the abbot of Newsham to resettle William and he was transferred to a house elsewhere — possibly Torre Abbey in Devon.

Meanwhile, the abbot of Prémontré became involved in a bitter conflict with Edward II over the order's right to extract subsidies from the English houses, which had been prohibited by legislation under Edward I in 1306. In 1310 John of Horsley was present at the provincial chapter that wrote to Abbot Adam of Prémontré, excusing the English abbots for the failure to attend the general chapter to render their subsidies, pointing out that they would be punished if they did so. Adam wrote back, threatening excommunication if they did not immediately pay their dues. The Abbots of Langdon and Sulby were ordered to publish the judgement of the general chapter and to collect the subsidies from their English peers, so they instructed the abbot of Newbo Abbey to convene a provincial chapter for the purpose. John of Horsley was one of those cited at the head of the summons, issued in November, presumably because he was one of the leading figures among the English abbots. After a renewed prohibition from the king on 10 November, both sides appealed to the Pope.

While these manoeuvres continued, Abbot Adam instructed the abbots of Dale and Langdon to carry out a visitation of Halesowen Abbey, taking with them the abbot of Welbeck: they were to correct abuses and be prepared to force the resignation of the abbot if necessary. The king suspected this was a stratagem for extracting a subsidy and sent a copy of his prohibition to both Dale and Langdon on 7 May 1311. They persisted with the visitation and found the abbot of Halesowen incontinent, uncooperative, incompetent and unfit to rule; the prior, son of a cleric, incapable of his office and not trusted to hear confession by the canons; and several other brothers guilty of various offences. However, before the visitors could proceed against them, the malefactors displayed the king's prohibition, claiming immunity from their sentence. The visitors made clear that they were not to be deterred and so were expelled from the abbey and refused accommodation, even at their own expense, at one of its granges or farms. Instead they travelled to Dale, where on the Nativity of Saint John the Baptist (24 June) they pronounced the excommunication of the abbot, prior, sub-prior, sacristan, precentor, cellarer and John of Gorscot, an offending canon: members of the order were not to communicate with them until absolved by the abbot of Prémontré.

The conflict between Prémontré and the king was settled largely in the latter's favour, in 1316. At the general chapter that year the rules on travel by canonesses of the order were tightened and John of Horsley was mandated to carry out visitations of two female Premonstratensian communities: Broadholme Priory, then in Nottinghamshire, and Irford or Orford Priory in Lincolnshire.

William of Horsley, evidently from John's home village and possibly a relative, also represented Dale effectively within the order. It seems that he was kept in touch with developments by an agent called Hugh of Toft, perhaps a canon of Dale deputed to gather intelligence. By 1336, under Edward III, the rumblings of what was to become the Hundred Years' War threatened to divide the English Premonstratensian houses from the mother house. The abbot of Prémontré was compelled to nominate deputies to administer the order in England and chose the abbot of Dale to head and represent the Midlands circaria. This came at a difficult time, as the order in the region was riven by a succession dispute at Croxton Abbey and a quarrel between Welbeck and Newsham over rights of visitation. William of Horsley was soon compelled to write excusing his failure to attend the general chapter that year: "reason turns away from and nature would abhor" such a course of action, he maintained. He had got as far as Dover but the preparations for war and the king's prohibition on attendance made the risks too great to continue. In 1344, however, William was given rights of visitation over the order in the whole country and thus made effectively the abbot of Prémontré's deputy in England. As war between England and France had now become endemic, he was unable to carry out this mandate without a working agreement with the king and applied for permission to carry out visitations of Premonstratensian houses. This was granted on 4 May. The king stressed that he was allowed to make a charge for his legitimate expenses in visiting abbeys and correcting abuses but not to remit contributions overseas. Two days later William was also granted royal protection while carrying out visitations, extending to his whole entourage, including the horses and their equipment. William's rôle seems to have continued for some years. In October 1345 he supervised the election of a new abbot for St. Radegund's Abbey in Kent, a house that had been founded directly from Prémontré. He then settled the former abbot at a manor belonging to the abbey, ensuring he had fowls and sheep for his sustenance, as well as a pension of 10 marks, and also arranged a room with comfortable and familiar surroundings at the abbey itself. On 4 February 1346, along with the abbot of Newsham, he again received the king's licence to carry out visitations on behalf of the abbot of Prémontré.

=== Political involvement ===
Abbots were important feudal lords and the main channel through which the abbey related to the monarch, the ultimate feudal authority, and in constant and increasing need of money. They were also major landowners, embedded in the often violent politics of their locality, county and region.

On 16 April 1264 Henry III took the abbot of Dale under his protection. However, on 30 April 1263, around the commencement of the Second Barons' War, the most violent of the local rebel magnates, Robert de Ferrers, 6th Earl of Derby, had issued a charter taking Dale Abbey under his protection. Although the charter was calendared in the ninth report of the Royal Commission on Historical Manuscripts in 1890, Isaac Jeays could find no sign of it and some other early charters when he inspected the Pole-Gell papers for his 1906 Derbyshire Charters. The precise contents have not been published and it is impossible to be sure whether Ferrers compelled the abbey to pay for his protection. He did launch a campaign of extortion in the Midlands that included surrounding Buildwas Abbey in Shropshire with an armed force until the monks paid 100 marks (£66 13s. 4d), as well as robbing the Jews of Worcester of their business documents. Cox, however, seems to have given Ferrers the benefit of the doubt by including his charter of protection among grants from the Ferrers family to the abbey.

With the emergence of the English Parliament in the later 13th century, the importance of attendance by major landowners, like abbots, rose as the needs of the monarchy for resources became steadily more pressing. Edward I abbots of Dale to Parliament in 1294, 1295, 1296, 1297, 1300, 1301, 1302, 1302 (twice), 1305 and 1307. Their actual attendance is uncertain, although it is clear that Richard of Normanton did take part in the 1294 parliament, as he obtained a charter granting free warren on many of his estates a few days after it was prorogued: it was recorded that he had requested the charter during the course of the parliament. Edward II summoned abbots of Dale in 1307 (for the second parliament of that year), 1309, 1311 and 1312

Abbots were sometimes used by kings to carry out tasks on their behalf, although these usually related to other churches. Abbot William de Boney was twice named, in 1364 and 1397, as part of commissions to investigate and reform St Leonard's Hospital, Derby, a notoriously corrupt institution that had royal patronage. Abbots were also commissioned by the king to take the oath of allegiance from abbots of other houses in the order and to take part in inquisitions post mortem.

Their status and wealth inevitably drew abbots into the politics of the locality and the county, demonstrating the extent to which effective power depended on a complex web of connections at local level. On 28 November 1381 Abbot William de Boney obtained for 20 shillings a commission of oyer and terminer on the complaint that Thomas Foljambe, accompanied by John Smyth of Stanley and other armed men, had assaulted him at Derby and driven him from the town. Foljambe was a lawyer, son of Godfrey Foljambe, who had been a Baron of the Exchequer, and he was to follow his father into the Lancastrian affinity, the network of officers and retainers centred on John of Gaunt, which dominated Derbyshire, including its parliamentary representation. However, he was a second son and his elder brother's son had inherited the family estates: Thomas would become head of the family only later, on the premature death of his nephew. He was still unmarried (although he was later to marry within the affinity), without great estates to call his own, and not yet on Gaunt's payroll, perhaps with much to prove. The man named at the head of those called to deal with the assault was William la Zouche, 2nd Baron Zouche. The Zouche family had some land in the county, especially around Ilkeston, but their principal estates lay elsewhere. They were called into Derbyshire politics at times of crisis, presumably because they were not aligned with the other main factions. He was assisted by a prominent judge, William de Skipwith, which suggests that the abbot's complaint was taken seriously. Foljambe had apparently been harassing the abbey in other ways, as he was also accused of trespass. He evaded questioning by the commission and writs of exigent were taken out against him and the other defendants—a step on the way to outlawry. They countered with a writ of supersedeas, by which mainprise or surety was established. The list of mainpernours or guarantors allowed them to display their political connections. First came Sir Nicholas de Stafford, illegitimate son of Richard Stafford, 1st Baron Stafford of Clifton, and a key figure in the Stafford family's political dominance in their own county, representing it in the Parliament of England no less than nine times. Stafford was closely involved with Thomas Foljambe in the establishment of a chantry at the Foljambe family's church of St John the Baptist, Tideswell. Next came Sir Nicholas Montgomery, an ardent Lancastrian for whom Foljambe acted as attorney while he served overseas. Finally, Thomas Tuchet, a cleric, and Richard Tuchet were members of a Markeaton family known to be close associates of Foljambe, and stepsons of Sir John Dabridgecourt, who drew up to 100 marks as an annuity from John of Gaunt. The case seems to have petered out, without the abbot being able to prove his case. The precise objectives of Foljambe in harassing the abbot and convent remain opaque, although he seems to have established his ability to employ violence with impunity. His career was not interrupted and in 1386 he was appointed for the first time as a justice of the peace for the county.

== Canons of Dale ==
=== Names and numbers ===
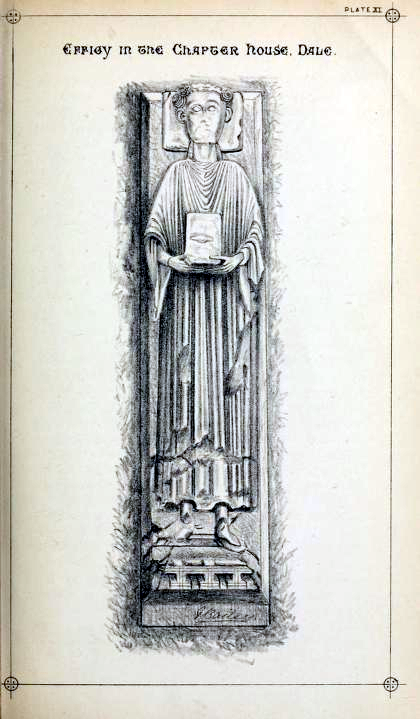
Effigy of a cleric as rendered in report of 1878 excavations.

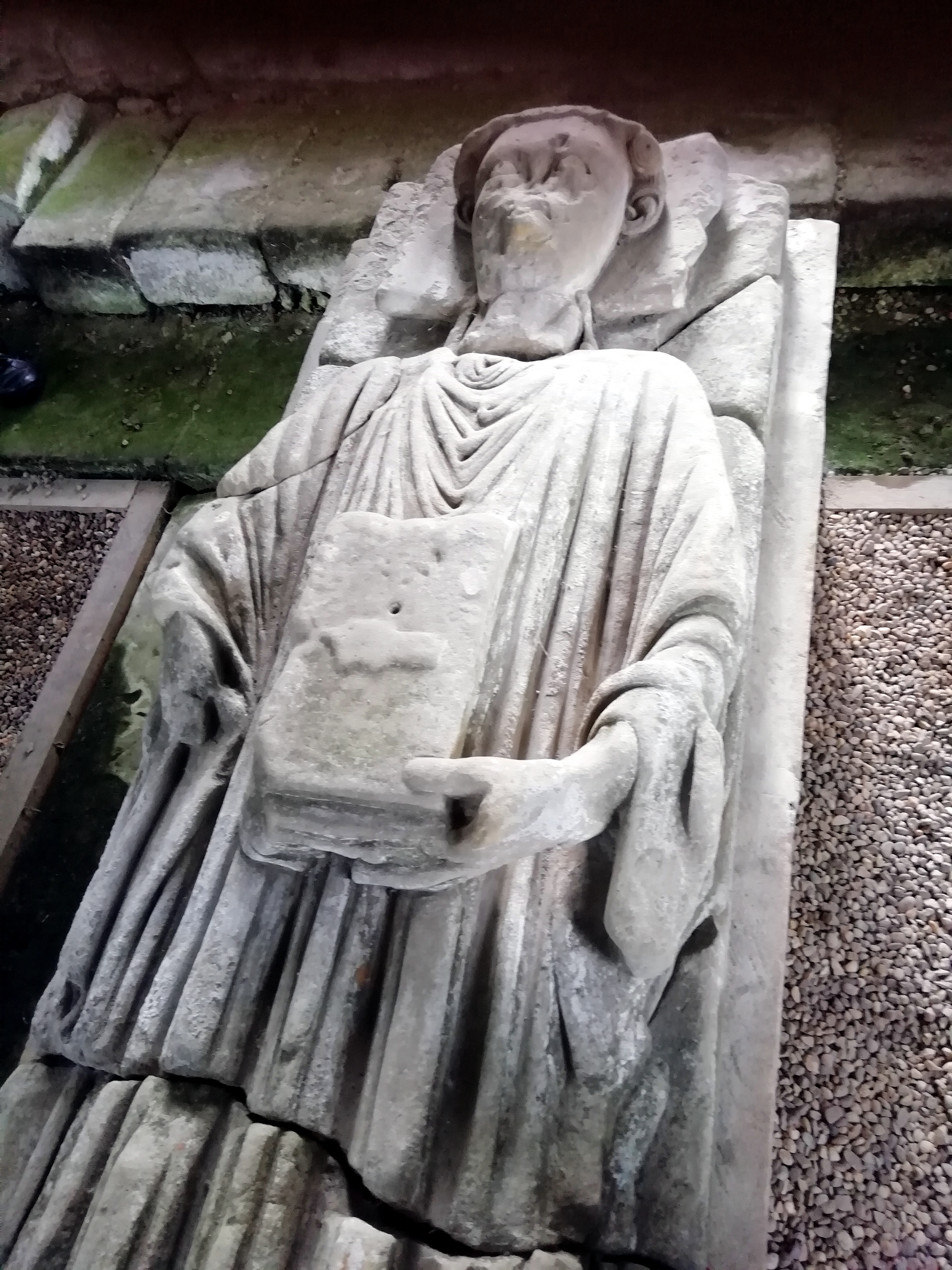
The same effigy photographed in the chapter house museum, 2019.

Initially said to be of a man in minor orders, a secular cleric and donor to the abbey who was buried there. Later guesses included a canon, possibly a prior. He is dressed in vestments, a cassock and surplice, for a liturgical function.

Bishop Roger Northburgh's register indicates that Dale Abbey had 24 canons in 1345. The numbers in the late 15th century are very well documented, as Bishop Redman was regular and efficient in his visitations. In 1475 he named 15 canons, in addition to the abbot. The number was the same three years later but fell to 14 in 1482. and 13 in 1488, before rising to 16 in 1491. The convent then remained at what seems its regular complement of 15 canons and the abbot from 1494 to 1500, although in the last of these years four were novices and low numbers were attributed to the plague. Fifteen canons also signed the deed of surrender and obtained pensions at the dissolution in 1538.

Howard Colvin extracted a list of over one hundred named canons and some lay brothers. Many of these have toponymic surnames locating their origins firmly in the locality or a little further afield in the East Midlands, like Stanley, Stanton, Ilkeston, Trowell, Wolaton, Derby, Horsley, Nottingham (at least six of them), Monyash, Normanton, Cruch, Draykott; close to concentrations of Dale's further flung estates, like Thurgarton and Leke; in Lincolnshire, with its relatively large number of Premonstratensian house, like Sempringham, Hagnaby and Lincoln. Some are less clear: three Bredons may be from Breedon on the Hill but there are other possibilities, while Wodhouse could refer to one of many localities. There are names like Wheatley and Widdowson, still characteristic of the area, and names that are still widespread all over Britain, like Wilson, Page, Spenser and Rede, but only one Smith. There are few, if any, French or other foreign surnames. The canons seem to have been be exclusively English-born, so far as can be seen from their names, although English toponymic names were adopted by the Anglo-Norman gentry, like the Grendons, so some of the canons and abbots were perhaps from this class.

=== Rôles and responsibilities ===
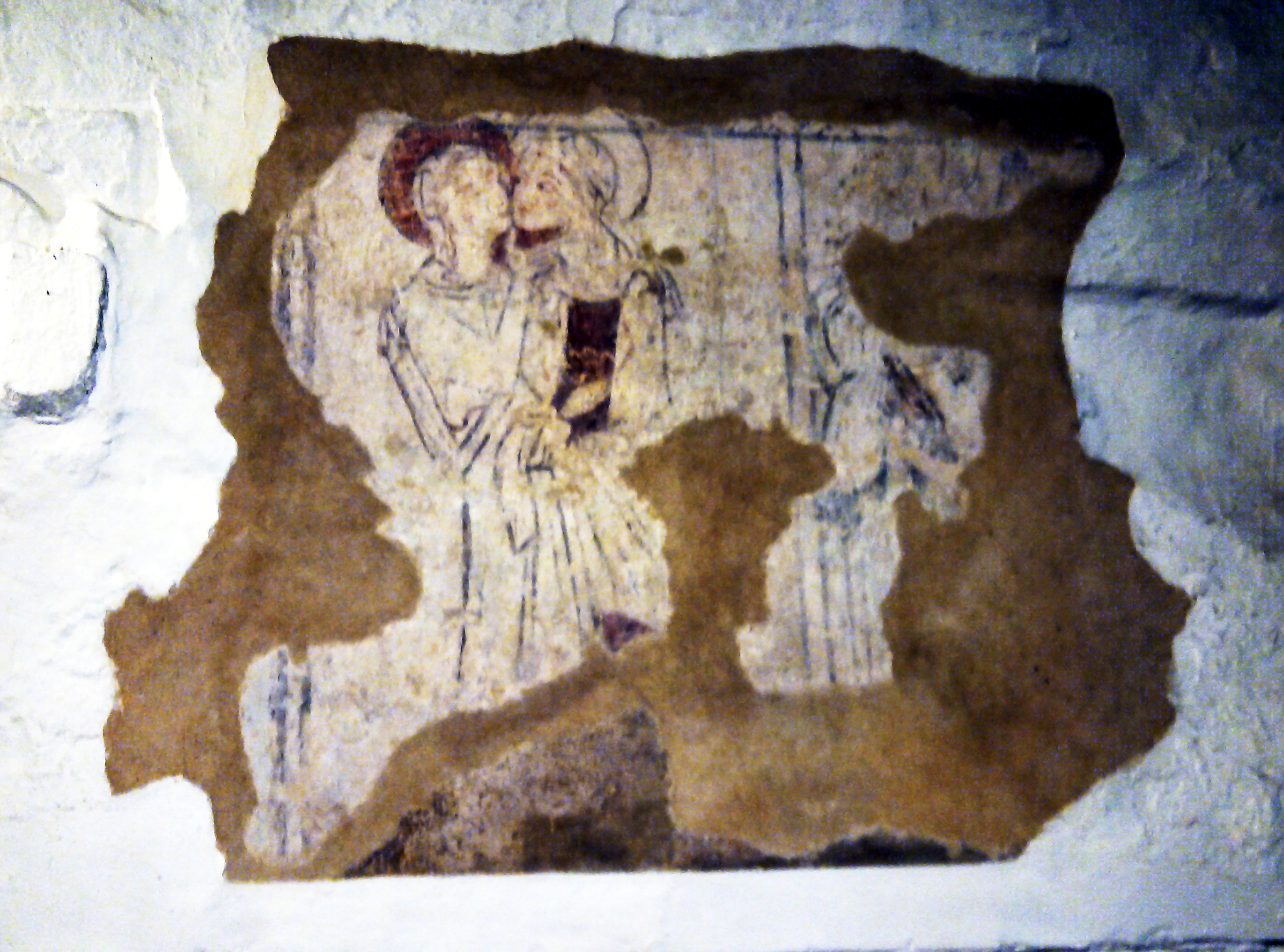
Wall painting of the Visitation, 13th century, All Saints' Church, Dale Abbey.

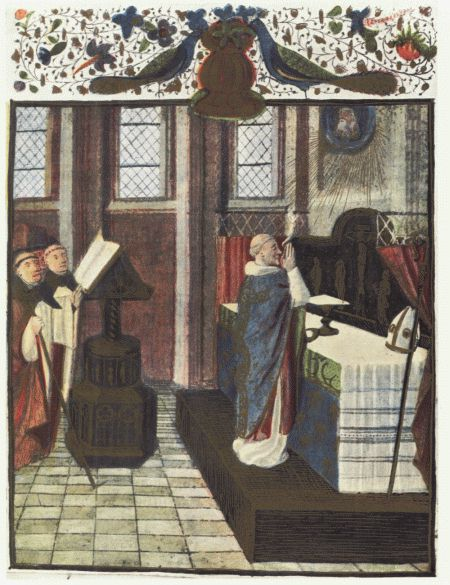
Pontifical or High Mass in the 15th century.

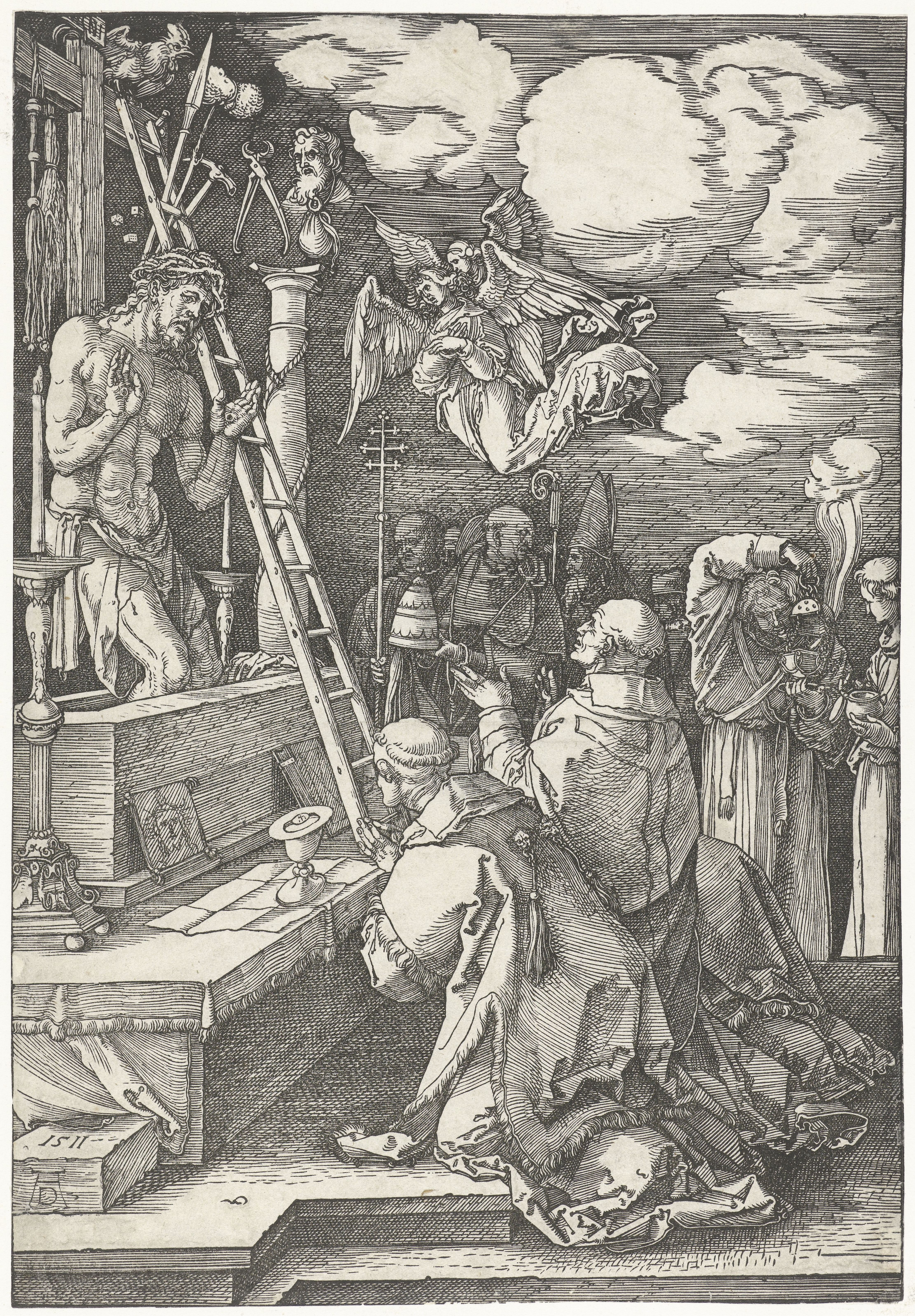
Mass of Saint Gregory by Albrecht Dürer, 1511. The Catholic understanding of the Sacrifice of the Mass and the linked doctrine of transubstantiation expressed through the legend of Pope Gregory I's vision of Christ himself on the altar.

Premonstratensian canons lived by the Rule of St. Augustine, as they still do. It is very short, prescribing little more than the daily office, regular study and moderate work. The main restriction on movement is the requirement that canons travel and dine in pairs or larger groups. Interpretation and local variation were paramount in determining the character of the religious life. The Premonstratensians were influenced by the Cistercians in their organisation and lifestyle, while most Augustinians looked more to the Benedictines for example. The prayer life of Premonstratensians has a strong Marian focus and devotion to Mary was almost certainly a very important aspect of life in Dale Abbey, with a strong emphasis on key events in her life and death, as well as on the corresponding festivals. The abbey dated itself from a Feast of the Assumption.

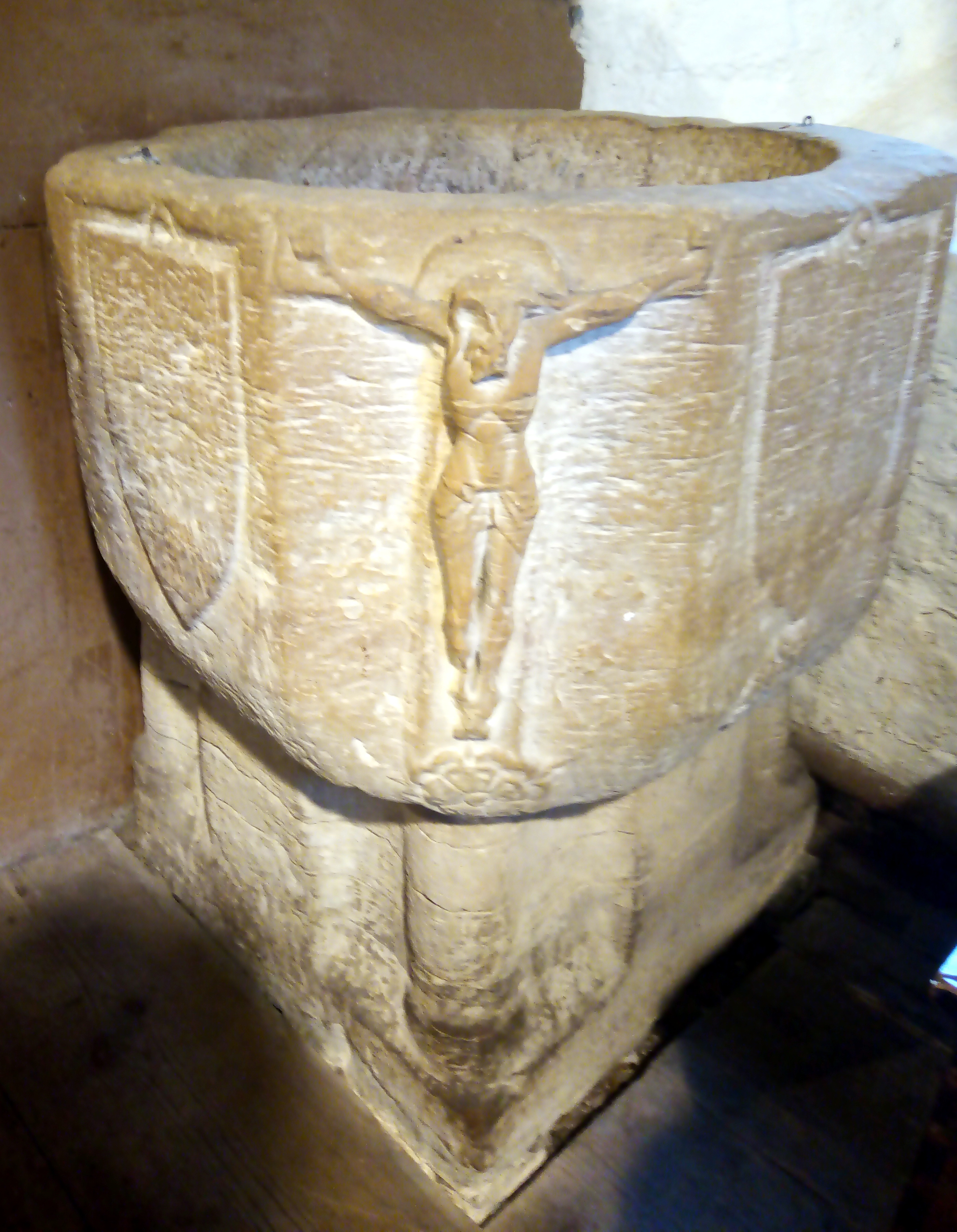
The Dale Abbey font, mid 15th century, now in All Saints' Church, Dale Abbey.

Unlike monks, who might or might not receive ordination, Premonstratensian canons normally progressed at least to the priesthood to preside at the altars of their own church or of any dependent churches. The visitation documents most often refer to the priests, the great majority of canons at any time, as sacerdotes, doers or makers of the holy, rather than as presbyteri, elders. However Redman's visitation of 1488 additionally describes Richard Bredon as presbiter of Stanton by Dale, as if it were the name of a position rather than an order, although the visitation of 1491 reverts to capellanus, chaplain. In 1488 Richard of Nottingham was vicar of Ilkeston, another man of the same name vicar of Heanor, and John Monyash vicar at Kirk Hallam. These duties might call them away from the abbey, so they were sometimes resident elsewhere, although only Heanor was beyond convenient walking distance. Unusually, the visitation of 1500 found a Richard Bredon acting as chaplain at Ockbrook, so more than a quarter of the chapter were at that point engaged in parochial duties.

Although the vicars and chaplains also had pastoral responsibilities, the essential work of all priests was to celebrate the Eucharist, not only or even generally as part of congregational worship, but in chantries for the donors of land and grantors of charters, including the royal family. The rationale of these depended on the Catholic theology of the Sacrifice of the Mass and the belief that there was a "special fruit" of Christ's sacrifice that was applicable at the will and intention of the priest, a belief that was the focus of Lollard and, later, Protestant, criticism of chantries. Donors, from the wealthy and powerful founders to peasants who granted a single acre, all expected prayers and masses for their souls. For many too there were beloved relatives to consider, like Richard de Jorz, whose soul was to benefit from the gift of a bovate in Stanton by his nephew, William of Sysonby. While most expected to be mentioned at the abbey itself, parish churches and chapels also had chantries operated by the canons, like the important Cantilupe chantry at Ilkeston, which required a daily mass. A chantry at Stanton be Dale is mentioned in a document of March 1482, in which Bishop Redman gives William Blackburn permission to serve it: this was in addition to John Green, the regular presbiter de Stanton.

The allocation of responsibilities at Dale Abbey seems to have varied considerably. In 1488 Abbot John Stanley had both a prior and a subprior to assist him: a large management team for a convent totalling just 14, although the abbot was an old man. He also had John York serving as his private chaplain. As well as the four parish priests, there were also a cantor, assisted by a succentor, a cellarer, and a sacristan, assisted by an under-sacristan: all but one of the convent thus had a specific office and set of responsibilities. Sometimes a visitation found no prior designated: just a subprior, usually assisted by a circator, who was responsible for patrolling the claustral buildings. Sometimes deacons are named: in 1494 these are John Bebe, who was the subsacristan, and George Slee, who was also titled the servitor infirmorum, the hospital attendant. It seems that the posts of sacristan and under-sacristan were considered good training experience and suitable for a canon not yet ordained to the priesthood: in 1500 the under-sacristan, was Leonard North, who was one of the four novices in the abbey at that time, while in 1491 Ralph Makarelle was sacristan while still a deacon, and in 1488 both the sacristan and his assistant were novices. Sometimes a magister noviciorum, master or teacher of novices, is named: William Lammas held the post in 1500.

=== Discipline and lapses ===
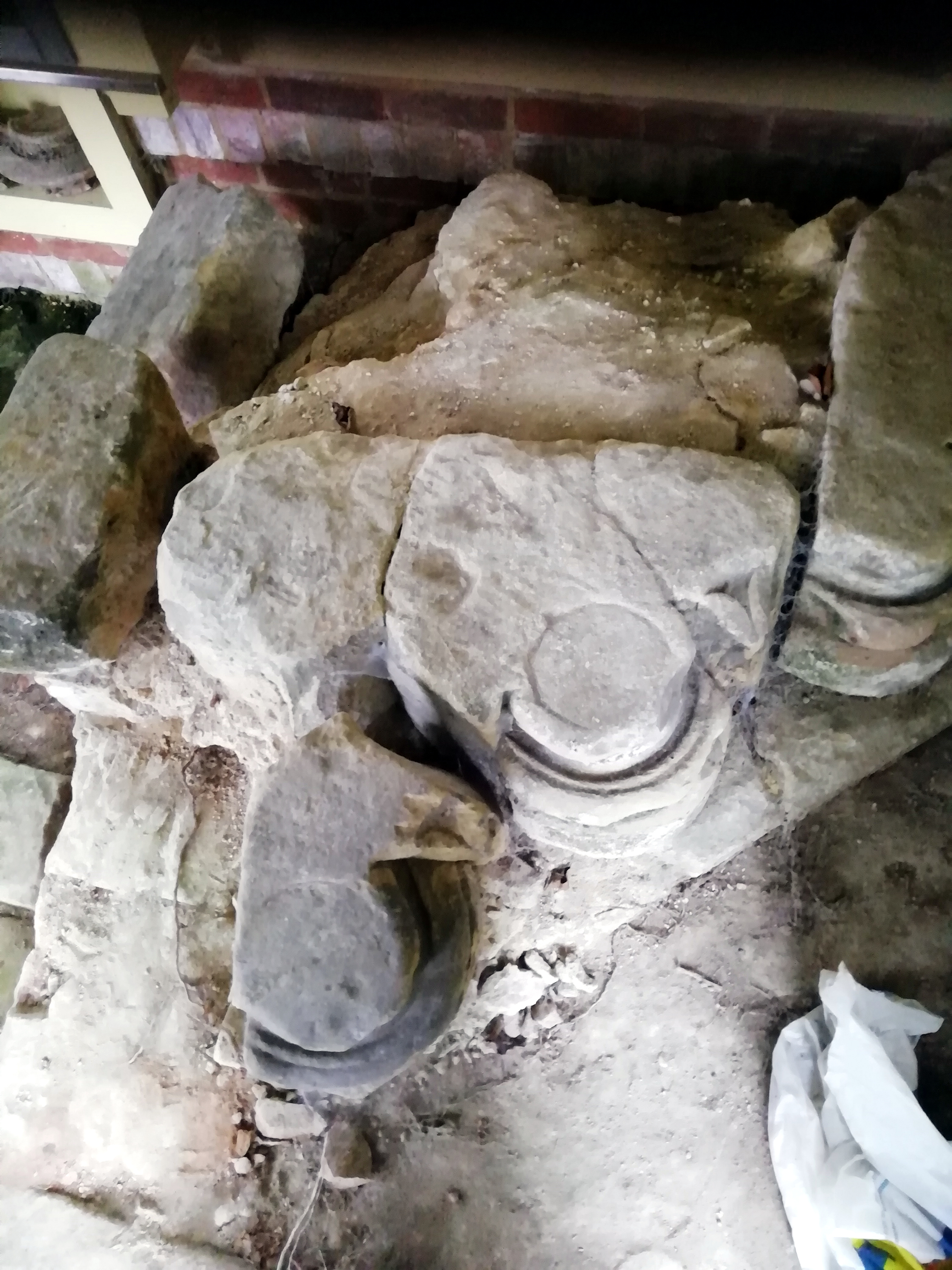
Footing of the entrance to the chapter house, apparently an elaborate marble construction.

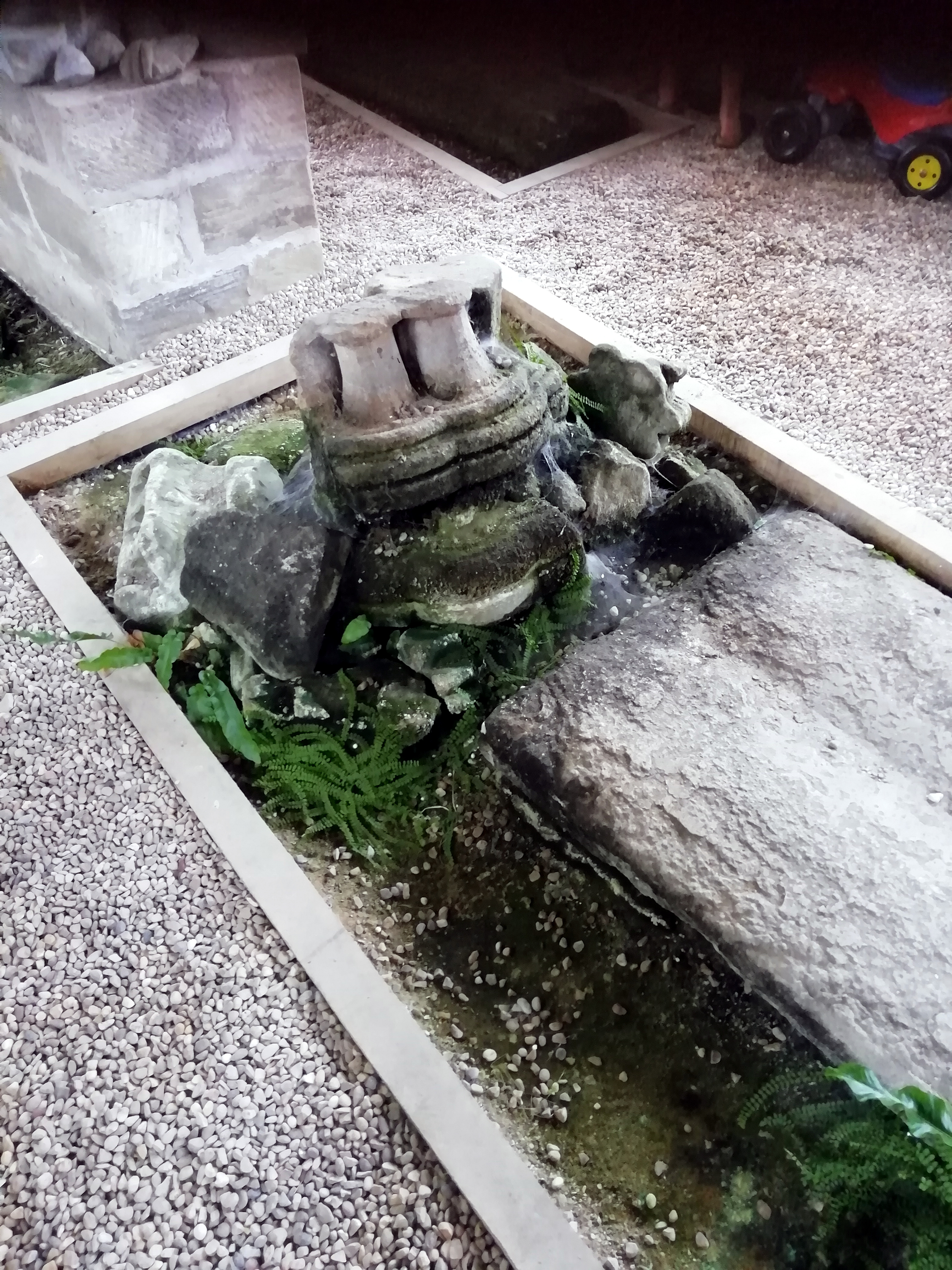
Base of central column of the chapter house.

Discipline in the abbey largely depended on the relationship between the abbot and his canons, who were pledged to obey him. An essential part of maintaining outward and inner discipline was the practice of confession: canons were expected to confess at least thee time a year to their superior, at least in the later decades. During the outbreaks of plague in the mid-14th century, given the high mortality rate among clergy, both clergy and laity took the precaution of gaining papal permission to confess to someone of their own choosing: William Rempstone of Dale is recorded as doing so in November 1354, following his abbot, William of Horsley in 1351.

Brother Robert of Derby wrote to the former abbot Lawrence, probably around 1290, in terms that suggest he saw the abbot as a friend and spiritual adviser rather than a mouthpiece of authority. After asking for Lawrence's help in reinstating a lay brother who had left the order but sincerely wanted to return, he reported on his further spiritual journey, which involved a stay at remote Cockersand Abbey.

For the rest, I have found in a desolate region a man after my own heart (viz. the Lord abbot of Cockersand), who showed me many things for your sake. I said I knew you well. May you, if you will, give him great thanks on my behalf in your letters. In all my prayers I desire to hear of your prosperity, which will come to pass, as I hope, when you give me your gracious reply to what I have written above. As for myself, your son and brother, know that I am well, as my health goes, though I should be even better if I could have the pleasure of conversing with you and enjoying your company. Valete.

It seems unlikely that William of Horsley would have been used so frequently as a visitor unless Dale had good reputation for monastic discipline in the mid 14th century. However, there were clearly variations in reputation. Redman wrote to Dale in 1474 announcing a visitation, referring to publica infame. The findings of the visitation are not known, but it was certainly additional to Redman's regular cycle, which brought a further visitation the next year. Not until 1478, when Dale was still under the same abbot, John Stanley, does anything of Redman's findings survive. In that year, the visitor general's conclusion was that: "we discovered good reputation, charity and peace, in head and limbs, and nothing criminal in need of correction by either us or the general chapter." His main reservations were that some unauthorised ceremonial practices had crept in, which he ordered to be discontinued, and that the quality of the food needed to be improved if the abbot were to avoid grumbling by the canons.

Some visitations provide evidence of personal crises, as well as serious infractions by particular canons. In 1482 John York had left the order but had been brought back "by the praiseworthy abbot's circumspection:" there must have been a full recovery of trust, as this is the man who was later to become the abbot's personal chaplain. In 1488 Richard Blackwall was found guilty of "vicious disobedience and open rebellion". It was proposed that he be sent to Alnwick Abbey for forty days of severe punishment. However, his own convent interceded and had the punishment suspended to allow time for him to mend his ways.

In August 1491 Redman discovered that discipline was suffering because of the "impotence and imbecility" of the abbot and found it necessary to forbid the canons to gamble or keep hounds. The situation cannot have been helped by the presence of two canons who had been sent to Dale from other abbeys for punishment. William or Gyll or Gylling of Coverham Abbey was at Dale on unspecified disciplinary grounds: in 1478 it was said that "he had brought a woman into the dormitory for the satisfaction of his lust," but he had successfully denied the charge. His case was remitted to the provincial chapter of the following year, which transferred him permanently to Sulby Abbey. George Littleport had been sent the Dale in September 1489 by the previous provincial chapter, after being imprisoned for theft at his own house, West Dereham Abbey. Redman found that at Dale his conversation was "loose and irreligious" and sent him to join the chapter at Beauchief Abbey, a decision that was ratified by the next provincial chapter. Blackwall, who had remained at Dale after being found rebellious at the previous visitation, was found not to have reformed: he was placed last in the abbey's hierarchy and deprived of his vote and stall. The situation among the canons clearly worried Redman and it seems he induced Abbot John Stanley to resign, as two months later his pension and retirement were arranged.

Redman carried out another visitation in May 1494 and generally approved of the administration of the new abbot, Richard Nottingham. However, two of the canons were found guilty of sexual "incontinence." Both were sentenced to forty days of severe punishment. Edward Hampton was sent to reside at Dureford Abbey in Sussex for five years. However, he probably left the order, as there are no further traces of him in documents relating to Premonstratensian houses. John Bebe, deacon and under-sacristan, had fathered a child by a woman called Margaret Hall and was sent to Halesowen Abbey for seven years, although this was suspended for the next provincial chapter to ratify. This sent him instead to Sulby Abbey, for so long as should please the visitor. By 1500 he was back at Dale, acting as cantor. It is likely that he later became abbot.

== Decline and dissolution ==
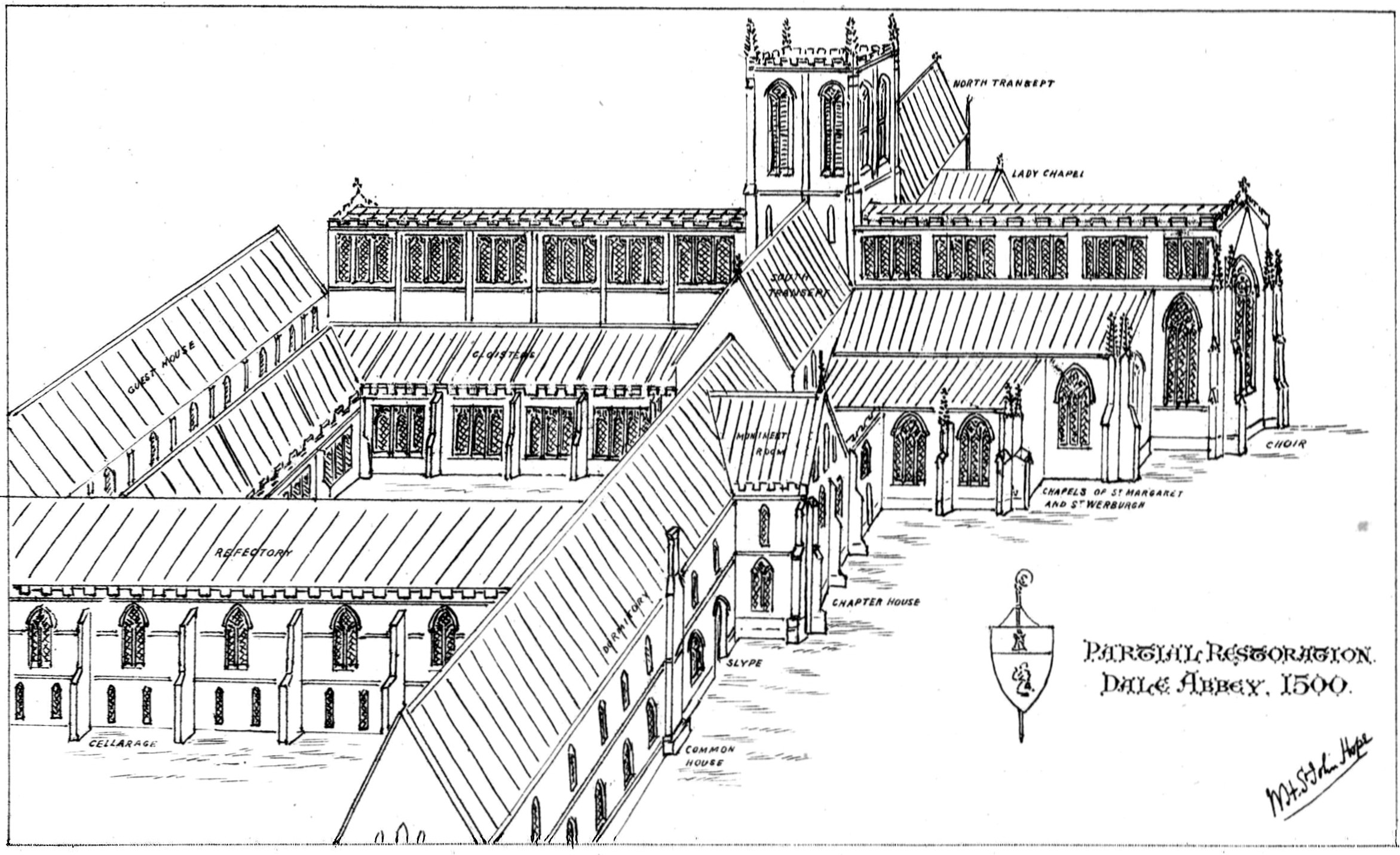
Sketch by William St John Hope showing a reconstruction of Dale Abbey as it might have been in 1500, based on the excavations of 1878.

=== The last abbot ===
During his visitation of 1500 Redman found nothing requiring criticism at Dale. He commented that the number of canons was low because of the plague but he was confident numbers would recover as the abbey's means could accommodate them. The number was actually normal, sixteen including the abbot, although four of them were novices, an unusually large proportion. With the death of Richard Nottingham in 1510 the name and identity of the abbot becomes questionable. In the summons to a convocation of the Province of Canterbury in 1529 the abbot of Dale is named simply John. In the Valor Ecclesiasticus and in the "Black Book" he is named John Stanton. Thereafter the abbot is always named John Bebe. Colvin thought it likely John Bebe of Stanton was a single individual who held the abbacy from 1510 until the dissolution in 1538, although there can be no certainty. It is also possible that this John Bebe was the same man who was sent to Halesowen for penance after fathering a child in 1494.

=== Standards ===
There were apparently no notable accusations against the abbey until its final years but what is known suggests that the life of abbots and canons did not match the standards of austerity expected in earlier centuries. The will of Johanna Holme, a widow of the parish of St Michael's Church, Derby, dated 1506, contains the clause:

"I bequeth to S Jamys Agarde my son Canon Regular of the monastery of oure lady of tha Dale xx'& vi yerdes of white wullen cloth A feyther bed A payr of Shetes and iiii. silv. spones"

In 1516 the abbot was present at an attempt to murder Thomas Mellers, the mayor of Nottingham, in the house of an alderman, John Williamson. Before the mercer came into the dining room with a concealed dagger, the party, which also included the prior of Lenton, had been "assembled in a friendly manner and joyfully conversing and drinking wine." Feather beds, dinner parties and wine suggest expectations more in keeping with the prosperous burgesses and lower gentry with whom the canons socialised than the severe lifestyle envisaged by St Norbert, the order's founder.

=== Preliminaries ===
The inquiry at Dale Abbey for the Valor Ecclesiasticus of 1535 was conducted Sir Henry Sacheverell, Sir Thomas Cokayn and Ralph Sacheverell, all from well-known Derbyshire gentry families. The income stood at £144 12 shillings, of which £114 15s. was contributed by temporalities and £29 17s. by spiritualities, almost half of the latter coming from Heanor. About £37 was paid out to vicars and in fees to the archdeacon and diocese. In 1536 Thomas Legh and Richard Layton carried out a tour of the Midlands, allegedly visiting 88 monasteries, including Dale, in just two weeks, looking for misconduct and superstition. Their report in the "Black Book" runs

Latin
Incontinentes. Johannes Staunton Abbas, cum una soluta et altera conjugata. Willimus Brampton cum quinque conjugatis feminis.

Hic in veneracione habent partem zonae et Lactis Sanctae Mariae et rotam Catherinae in argento

Fundator, § Gervasius Kyngeston, Armiger.

Redditus annuus cxl.

English
Incontinence. John Stanton, Abbot, with one single and one married woman. William Brampton with five married women.

Here they hold in veneration some of the girdle and milk of St. Mary and the wheel of Catherine in silver.

Patron, Gervase Kyngeston, armiger.

Annual income £140.

It is possible that the allegations made against the abbot are simply a reheating of a very old scandal, the disgrace of the deacon John Bebe more than forty years earlier, although there can be no certainty that this was the same man. There are the same uncertainties with the canon who was criticised: a William, popularly known as Brampton, was removed from Easby Abbey in 1491, on Redman's instructions and for unspecified offences, but it is unclear whether this was the same man, whether the offences were recent, or whether the accusations had any foundation at all. The relics of Mary and Catherine of Alexandria are otherwise unknown.

=== Temporary reprieve ===
As the abbey's income was well below the threshold of £200 required for it to continue in existence, it would be expected to undergo suppression with the other "lesser" monasteries. However, on 30 January 1537 its exemption was recorded, as one of 33 smaller monasteries permitted to continue. The Court of Augmentations account for the exemption was not filed until 29 September of the following year and revealed that Dale had paid a fine of £166 13s. 4d. for its exemption, more than its annual income. It is notable that none of the canons requested release from their vows, transfer to other houses or to become secular clergy, all options that were left open by the commissioners, so there was probably a unanimous desire to carry on the life of the community. However, by 1538 even large monasteries were tumbling into the king's hands as the commissioners exerted ever greater pressure.

=== Suppression ===
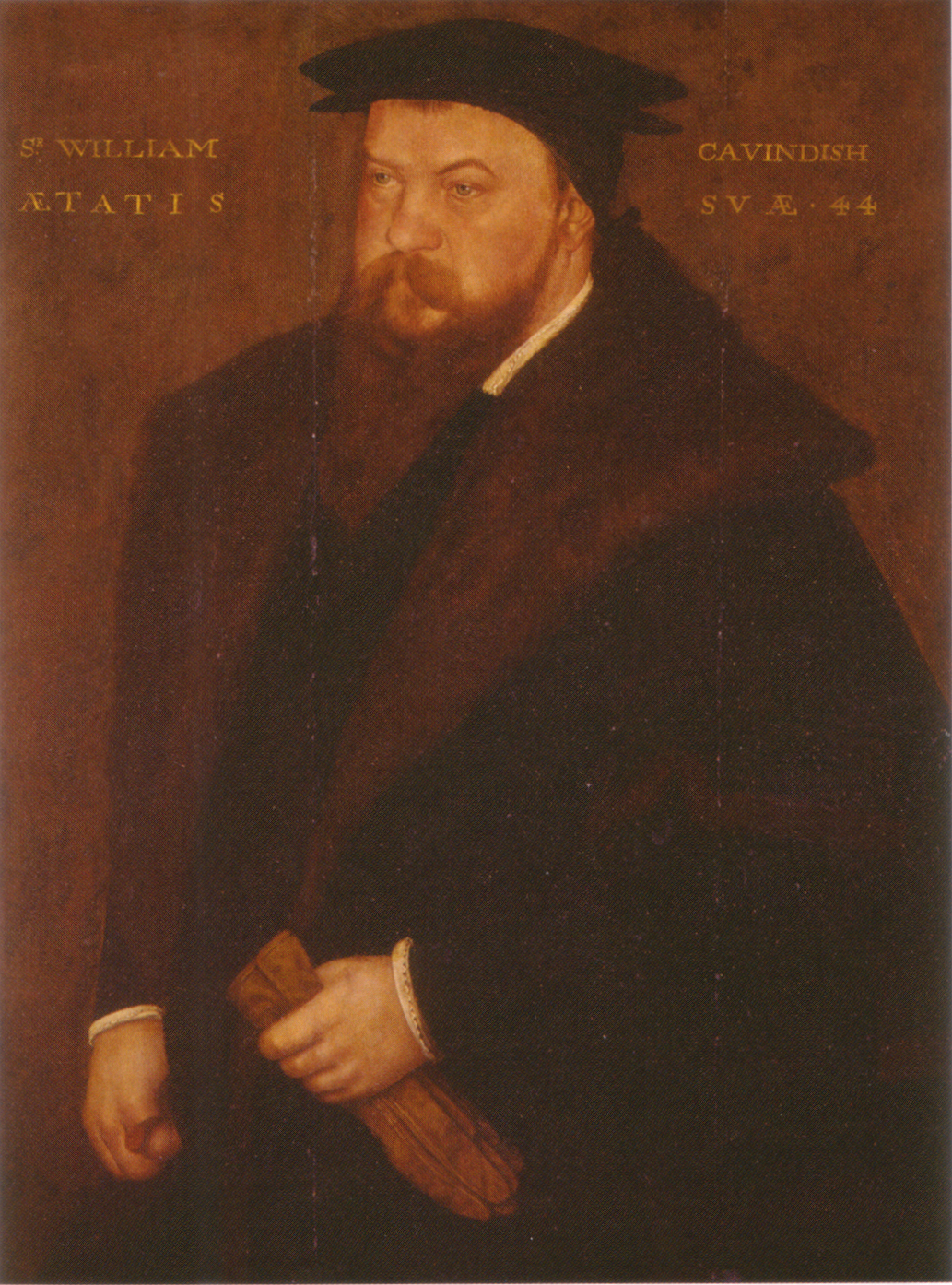
William Cavendish

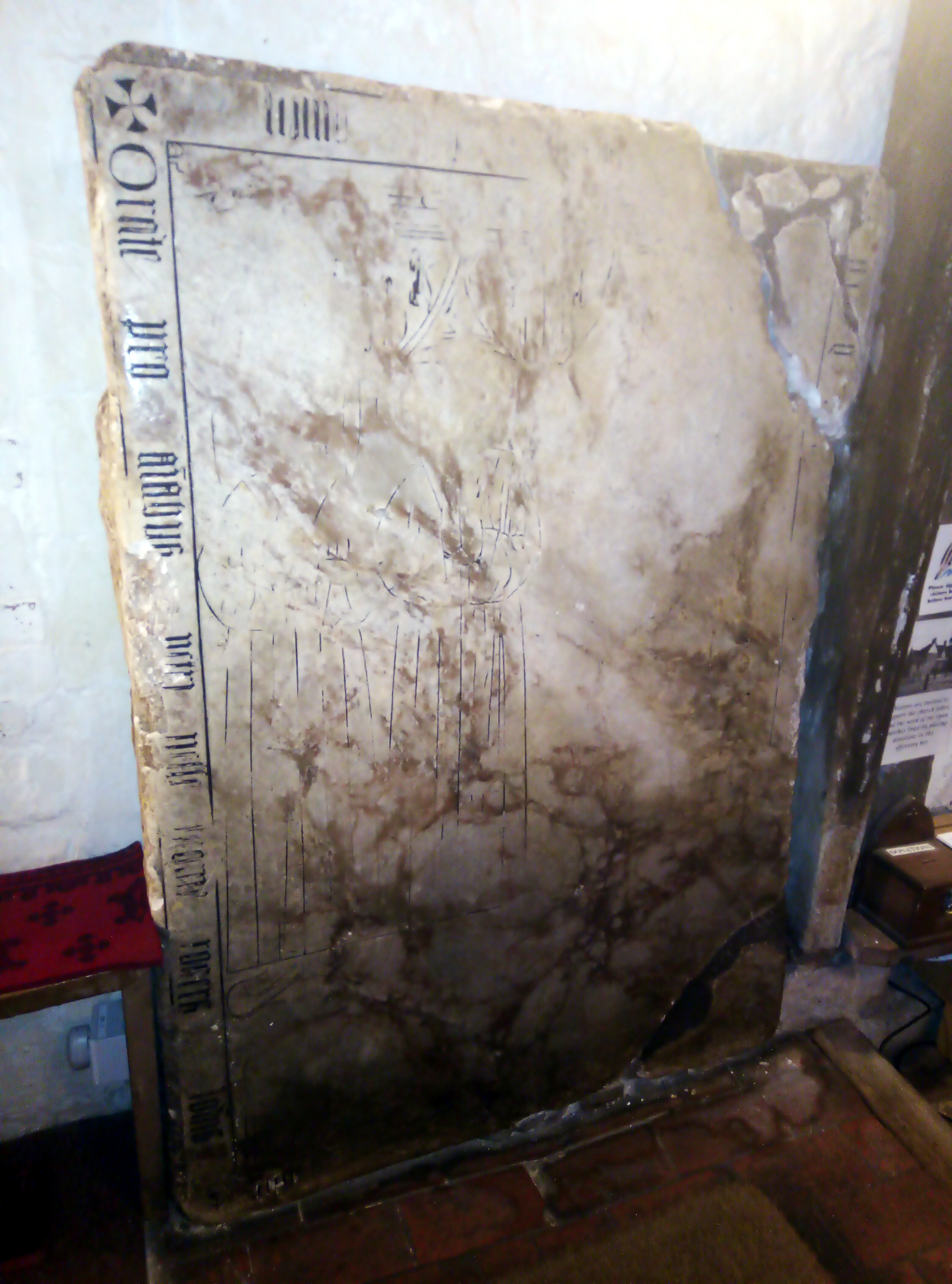
Memorial to members of Ness family and another man (name obscured) of Dale Abbey, 1532, in All Saints' Church.

Dale Abbey and all its estates in Derbyshire, Nottinghamshire, Leicestershire and Northamptonshire were surrendered to William Cavendish, the commissioner for the Crown, on 24 October 1538. Cavendish had begun a tour of religious houses in the Midlands due for dissolution on 15 October. He had dealt with six when he arrived at Dale and four more would follow it. he brought masons and carpenters to unroof the buildings, thus rendering them useless for further occupation. The deed of surrender was signed by Abbot John Bebe, Prior Richard Wheatley, John Gadman (possibly Cadman), Richard Hawsten (or Halsame), Thomas Bagshaw, William Smith, John Banks, John Shelmode, George (possibly Gregory) Coke, Robert Harvey, Ralph Harrison, Robert Wilson (or Herwood), James Cheryholme, James Cleyton, John Bateman, Robert Jerett (possibly Gerard) and Roger Page. Smith, Cleyton and Cheryholme all signed with marks, probably because they were illiterate or incapable. The abbot and canons were each given a sum of money on their departure. For the abbot it was the considerable sum of £6 13. 4. or ten marks. The other canons received either 40s. or 30.s, except for Bateman who got 20s. and Harrison, who went away with just 1 shilling. Various others received small payments, including 20s. for William Cooke, the parish priest of Stanley, and 8s. for "John of the Henhouse."

On the day of surrender a jury of twelve local people assisted the commissioners in making a full inventory of "all such parcells of implements or householde stuffe, corne, catell, ornaments of the churche and such other lyke founde within the late monastery ther at the tyme of the dissolucon of the same house, soulde by the Kinges Comissionors to Fraunces Pole, esquier..." This included valuable items in the church, including two organs; reusable materials, including lead roofing and glass, in the cloister, valued at £6; valuable brass pots and other vessels in the kitchen, brewery and bakery; feather beds in all the private bedrooms, although none specified in the canons' dormitory, where the contents were valued at only 7s. 6d. There were considerable stores of foodstuffs at both the abbey itself and in the barns and storehouses at the granges, including grain, malt and livestock, as well as horses and "waynes" or carts. There is no mention of books.

The total value was given as £77 12s 2d. Cavendish seems to have let Francis Pole have £30 worth of the goods on account as he deposited a certificate:

"And Sir Wm. Cavendishe owes xxx. li by ffraunces Pole de Rodborne in the Countie of Derby, Armiger a debt to his Majestie ye King by an obligacione given 24 October in the xxx Regis predicti, to be paid on the Feast of the Nativitie 1540, as by an indenture and book more clearly appears."

The jury made a similar note of the shortfall in their inventory. As the commissioners had disbursed considerable payments to the abbot, canons and others, and had to buy fencing to secure the livestock during the sale, Francis Pole's failure to find the full price of his purchases on the day left them temporarily with no net profit: "And so remayneth in the seid Comissioners handes nil, for they have payd more then they have recevyd by the summe of vij l. xvij s. vj d. (£7 7s 6d.)". Except for a few items, the monastic buildings themselves, with all their valuable roofing and paving, including 200 fothers of lead worth a total of £800, were not sold. The roofs were not dismantled systematically: reporting on excavations carried out on the north transept during 1878, St John Hope reported:

"On the east side of this transept is a large square chapel, which originally had a vaulted roof, but, from the way in which the ribs lay on the floor, it is evident that it was demolished by knocking out the keystones, and letting the whole fall."

The six bells, totalling 47 cwt, were also unsold and remained so to the end of Henry VIII's reign. When Cavendish and Legh then returned to inspect them, they were only five in number and weighed 45 cwt., so a small bell had been stolen.

The pension roll of the former convent was later appended to the inventory. The abbot, with £26 13s. 4d. was allotted a much larger pension than any of the canons. Prior Richard Wheatley and five others received 106s. 8d. and the rest lesser amounts, with Jerett on only 16s 8d. One canon, Roger Page, did not qualify for a pension, as he opted to continue his work as vicar of Kirk Hallam, where the living was worth 40s. There were also fees, annuities, debts and bills to be paid. These debts totalled £24 11s. 6d. To set against them there was just 20 shillings owed by Robert Nesse, the former bailiff, for woods and hedges in his farm, and not payable until the next Lady Day.

Considerable doubts were expressed about the honesty of Cavendish and Legh during the tour that involved the suppression of Dale Abbey. A commission was appointed to investigate and Sir John Daunce or Dauntesey was ordered by the king to submit a

"Declaration for the trial of certain particular sums of money paid by William Cavendisshe, Commissioner appointed with Thomas Leighe, doctor in the law, for the dissolution of divers and sundry houses of religion hereafter ensuing, for the rewards and wages of divers and sundry persons being servants within the same."

The houses involved were listed beneath, Dale Abbey among them. It was alleged that, when the first payments had been recorded, "William Cavendish added sundry sums of money written with his own hand without knowledge of any of his said clerks." The sum in dispute came to £34 13s. 8d. There were also allegations that the pair had pocketed the proceeds of sales of plate from Merevale Abbey. It seems that the investigation came to nothing: Cavendish's career continued unimpeded.

== After dissolution ==
=== Former chapter ===
The former canons and abbot continued to draw their pensions, in some cases for many years. In 1552, in the reign of Edward VI, a commission was set up to collect information about the pensions of former monastic communities, as part of a campaign against abuses that had crept in because pensions were being bought and sold as financial investments.

In Derbyshire this was conducted by four local landowners, all deeply involved in the new landscape created by the dissolutions of religious houses, which now included the chantries and collegiate churches. The most senior, William Cavendish, was now allowing his government responsibilities to slip into chaos as he settled on his Derbyshire estates with Bess of Hardwick. Sir John Byron was a heavy investor in Nottinghamshire monastic properties. Sir John Porte had bought most of the Dale Abbey estates in 1543 and made himself perhaps the greatest landowner in Derbyshire; Thomas Powtrell had bought Stanley Grange and other Dale properties in 1544. The commissioners were instructed:

"ffirste ye shall enquire how many of the late Abbots Priours Abbesses prioresses Monkes Channons ffryers nonnys Incumbents and other mynyster of any Abbey Priory hospital howse of ffryers colleges chauntries ffree chapels guilds or ffratemityes and stipendiary priestes or eny other having rent chardge annuytie or pencion going oute or charged of any Abbey Priory hospital &c or out of any their possessions for term of life mentioned in a Sedule or book hereunto annexed be or shal be at the tyme of your session deade and what time and where every of them die."

A letter attached to the commissioners' report, dated 30 October 1552, prefaces a list of pensions and annuities due to be paid out in the year up to Michaelmas by Robert Goche, the receiver for the Court of Augmentations in Cheshire, Derbyshire, Lincolnshire and Nottinghamshire, 1547–53, and himself an enthusiastic dealer in former monastic properties. The list for Dale Abbey is headed by the fees of William and Henry Sacheverel, who were stewards of the abbey site, and then goes on to the eleven surviving canons, before listing the annuities of Cavendish's hangers-on, still being drawn 14 years after the day the abbey was suppressed. The abbot and prior are not included.

The main body of the report then lists the commissioners' findings. For Dale Abbey all of the former canons' pensions are in arrears for six months or a year. The reason for the longer delay is given "as John Okeley." This man was the former prior of Gresley Priory: as his name is first on the list for the whole county, he is used as reference point for the rest. Okeley had attested that his pension was in arrears because "Mr. Gooche sayd he had a commyssion for the first half yere to stey the payment thereof until the Kyng's mejestyez pleasure were knowen." The advent of the commission, intended to rectify wrongs, had been used as an excuse to postpone payments to the pensioners intended to benefit from it.

Of the former canons, Cleyton, Bateman and Gerard had not appeared before the commission. Cadman displayed a deed of the abbey awarding him a corrody of 40s. in addition to his pension: this was also in arrears. Former prior Richard Wheatley gave evidence that ex-abbot John Bebe (given as Bebye) had died as early as St Gregory's day (March 12) 1540 at Stanley Grange; Thomas Bagshaw had died at Little Eaton in 1542; William Smith at Stanley Grange around the same time; Robert Harvey at Alton, Staffordshire in 1543; and Robert Herwood in 1545. Cadman's evidence about the fate of his former brothers was confusing: he assured the commissioners that Richard Wheatley had been dead for seven years. All of the canons interviewed and listed in 1552 were still alive in 1555/6, in the reign of Mary I, when a pension list was compiled, but thereafter nothing is known of them.

=== Estates ===
The inventory makes clear that Francis Pole of Radbourne, Derbyshire had taken over the estates of Dale Abbey on 23 October 1538, the day before he failed to pay in full for the contents he had selected. A record of 1540 mentions the granges of Ockbrook and South-house (Sothome), two other granges, a coal mine in Stanley Field, a water mill and tanhouse (presumably a tannery) in Dale and pasture in Dale and Ilkeston: useful pieces of information about the abbey possessions, but not a full account. As Pole was leasing the land from the Crown, dealings began in the reversions when Alice Bromley, a London widow, invested £265 in the reversions and rents for 21 years of various properties in Dale and Stanley in December 1542. Such dealings could undermine the value of the estates and enmesh them in legal complexities.

Pole simplified matters in February 1544 by converting his leasehold tenure to a grant in fee For this he paid £489 0s. 10d., although this also covered some lands in Yorkshire previously held by Wykeham Priory and the Knights Hospitaller. This must have been part of a plan to sell at a profit, as Pole and Katharine, his wife, obtained licences to alienate both groups of estates only a few days later, on 22 February. The Yorkshire land went to Richard and Ellen Hutchinson, Yorkshire gentry already resident in Wykeham, but the much larger portfolio of Derbyshire estates were sold to John Porte, his uncle.

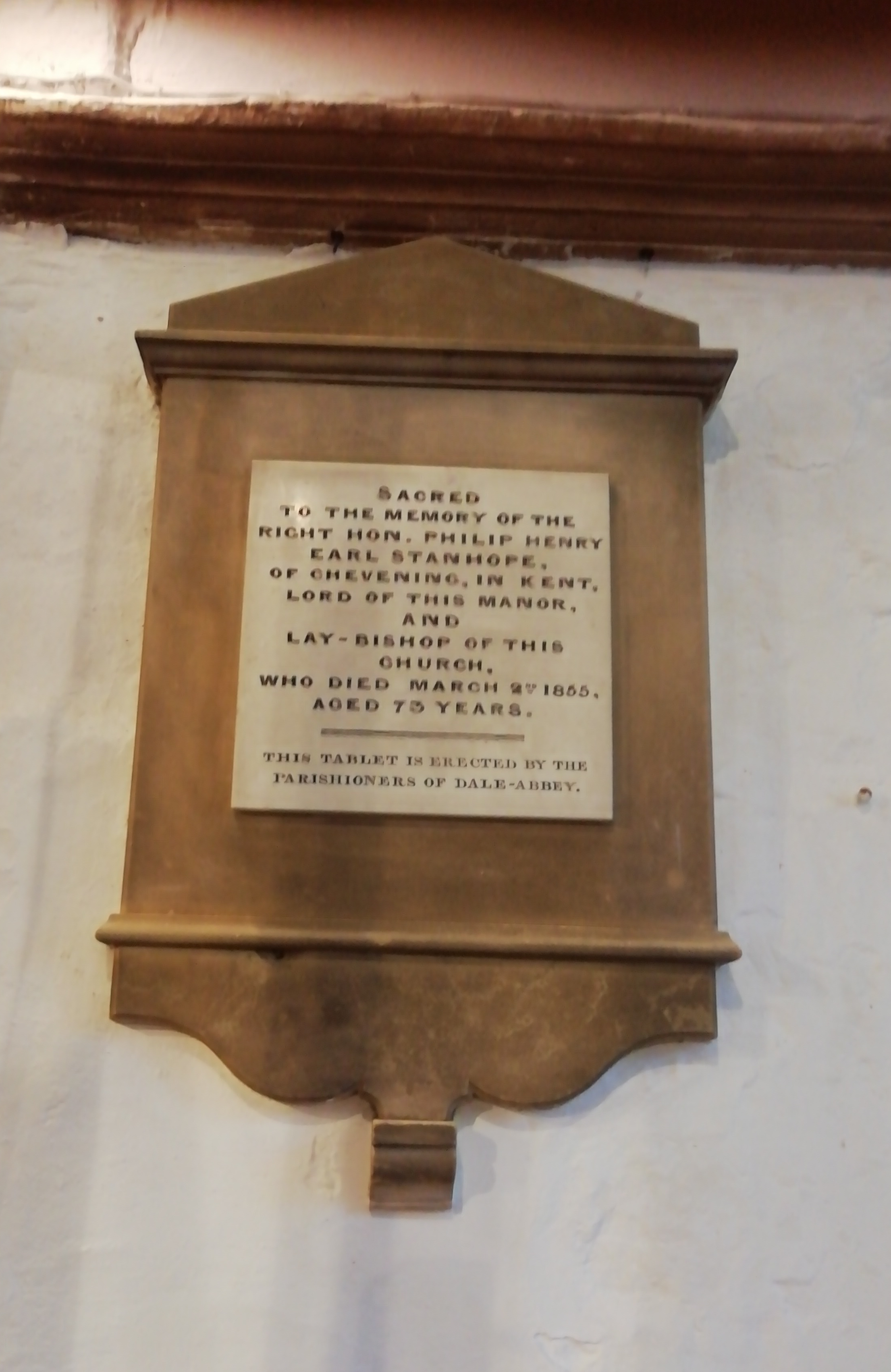
Stanhope memorial, All Saints' Church, Dale Abbey

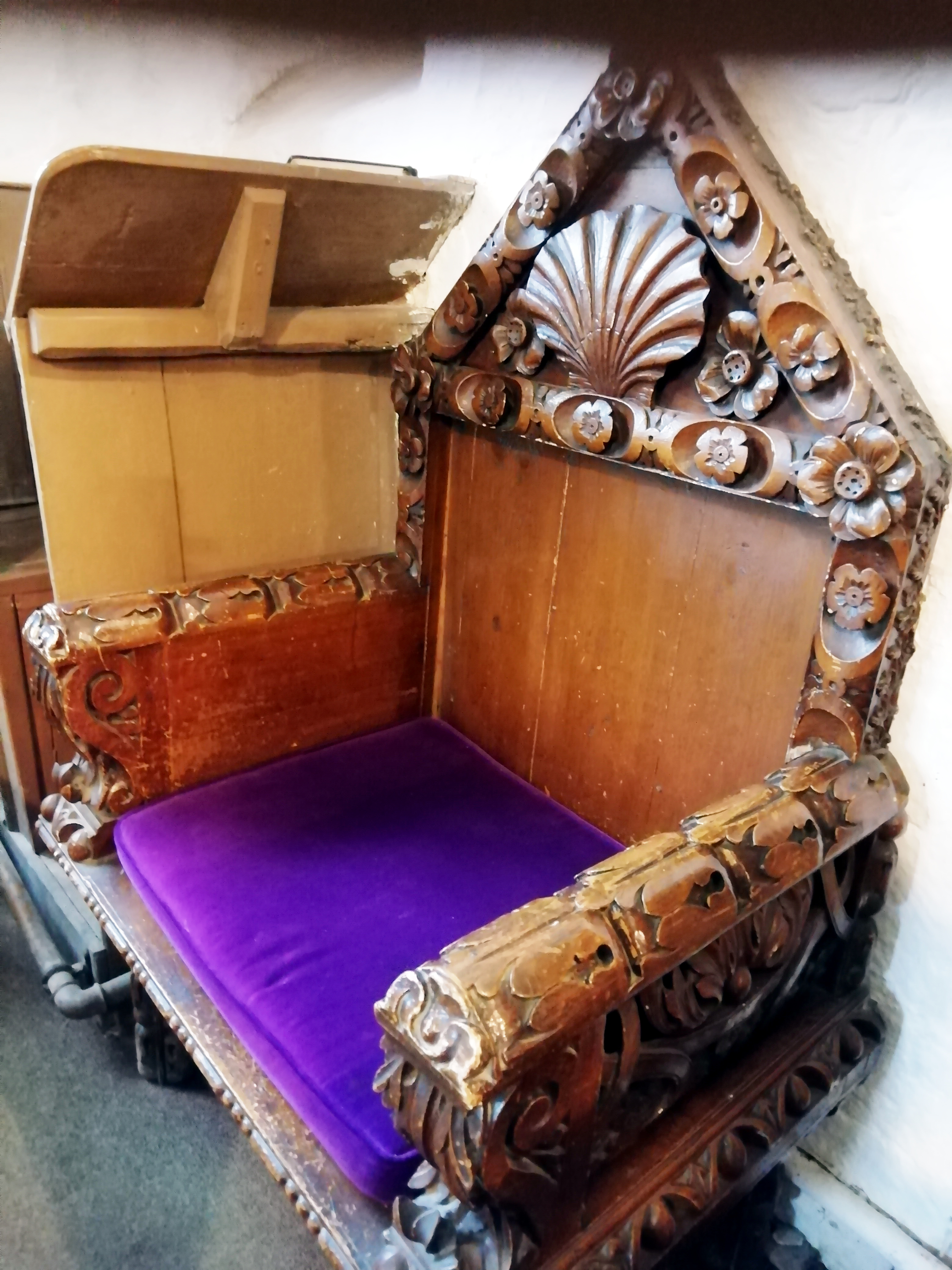
Lay bishop's throne, All Saints' Church, Dale Abbey

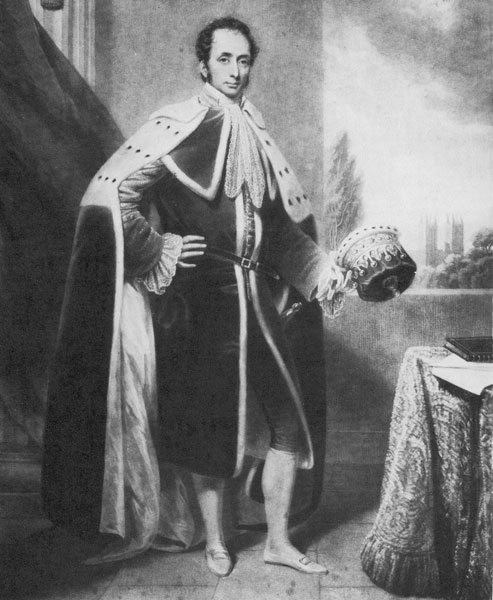
Philip Henry Stanhope, 4th Earl Stanhope, c. 1825

Porte left his vast estates to his co-heirs, three daughters. Elizabeth, who inherited the family seat at Etwall, married Sir Thomas Gerard of Bryn: the pair were known to be Catholic recusants during the reign of Elizabeth I and their younger son, John Gerard was to leave a valuable record of his life as an underground Jesuit priest. They were to face constant financial difficulties as a result of their religious and political choices and Thomas was imprisoned for a time, accused of involvement in a plot to free Mary, Queen of Scots.

Margaret married Thomas Stanhope, one of a large Nottinghamshire family of politically active brothers. Michael, their father had been executed in 1552 as a supporter of Edward Seymour, 1st Duke of Somerset, who had married their aunt, Anne Stanhope. Dorothy married Sir George Hastings, who later became Earl of Huntingdon. In 1568 Elizabeth and Margaret, with their respective husbands, sold their shares of the manor of Dale and a large part of the lands to their sister Dorothy and Hastings, with the provision that the estates pass to Dorothy's descendants. If Dorothy and Hastings seemed best placed to hold the estates together at the time, their own financial position weakened as their dignity rose because the Huntingdon lands, which George inherited from his brother, Henry Hastings, 3rd Earl of Huntingdon, were heavily encumbered — to the extent that the widow refused to bury her husband or administer his estate.

With such a difficult inheritance, the descendants of Hastings and Dorothy chose to sell some of their assets: the Dale estates were bought by Sir Henry Willoughby of Risley Hall and were soon subject to the processes of division, dispersal and recombination that were inevitable in a property market, making the trail is more complex and difficult to follow. Moieties of the manor passed during the 17th century to parts of the Grey family, who held the title Earl of Stamford and to the D'Ewes baronets.

By a process of marriage, inheritance and purchase, the manor was reunited in 1778 in the hands of Philip Stanhope, 2nd Earl Stanhope. Although the Stanhope family now owned the site and a considerable estates in the area, most of Francis Pole's original purchase had been dispersed among numerous landowners.

=== Lay bishop ===
As the Premonstratensian abbeys were all exempt from the jurisdiction of the local bishop, their abbots effectively had episcopal rights within their own parish. The dissolution of an abbey meant that the lay impropriator was considered to inherit these powers and so was considered lay bishop. In the case of Dale parish, the lords of the manor claimed this title and function. Licences for weddings and probate were both ecclesiastical issues until the mid-19th century, so the lay bishop dealt with both through a Peculiar Court.

In 1900 Revd R. Jowett Burton, then curate of Dale published a transcript of the register of All Saints' Church, pointing out that although the church at that time expected to solemnize about three marriages per year, there had been 38 in 1685 and 46 in the following year. This was because under the rules of the Preculiar Court, couples could marry at Dale for a fee of one shilling and the parish clerk could preside when the minister was not available. The Peculiar kept the fees competitive to draw in couples from nearby parishes and the fees were contributed to poor relief.

This arrangement was partly disrupted by the Marriage Act 1753, which made the presence of an authorised Anglican minister necessary. A list of wills proved by the Peculiar Court of Dale in the late 18th century was published in 1892 by the legal historian William Phillimore Watts Phillimore and local probate matters continued to be the preserve of the court until 1857. By this time the Church Discipline Act 1840 had already deprived the clergy of peculiars of their authority over marriages.

While the lay-bishop had a role, the Earls Stanhope took it seriously, particularly the fourth earl, whose status as lay-bishop is attested on his memorial tablet in All Saints' Church, Dale Abbey. A lay-bishop's throne, apparently from his period, is also housed in the church.

=== Abbey buildings ===
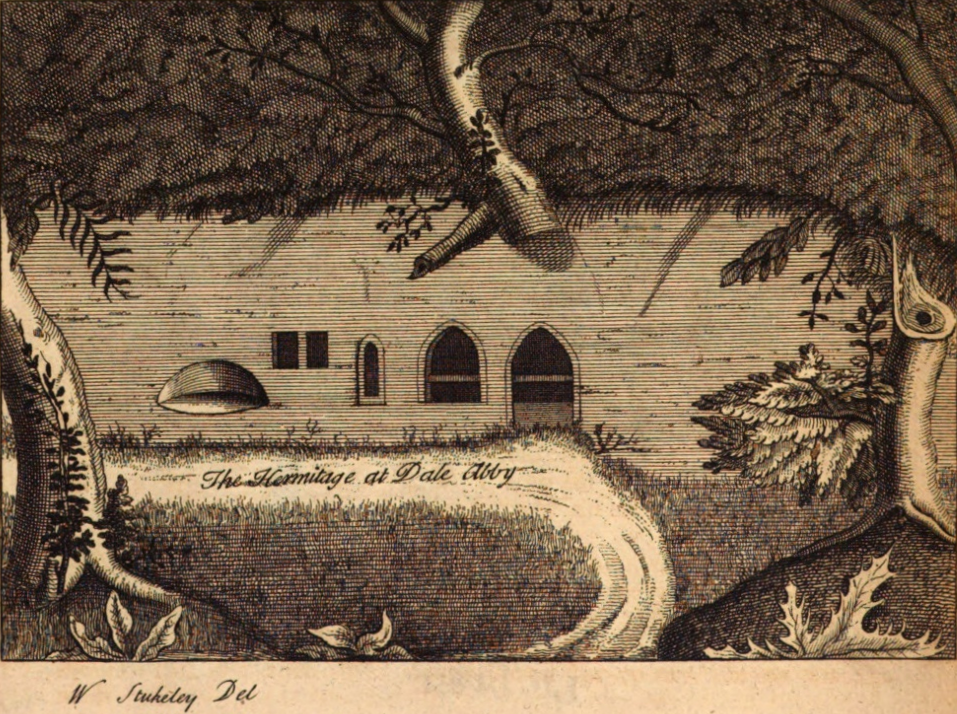
The hermitage at Dale Abbey according to William Stukeley, c. 1724.

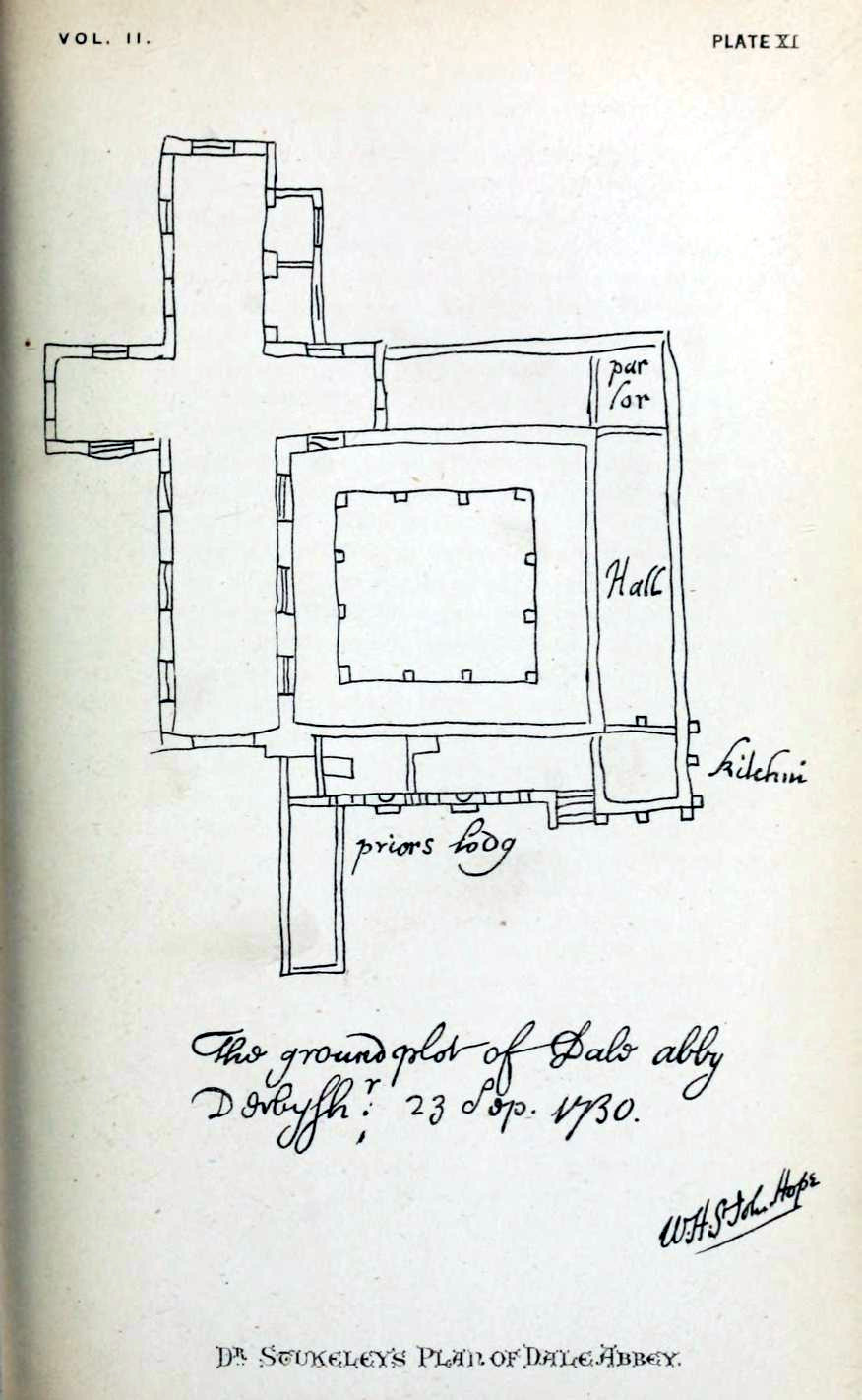
Sketch plan of Dale Abbey by William Stukeley, 1730

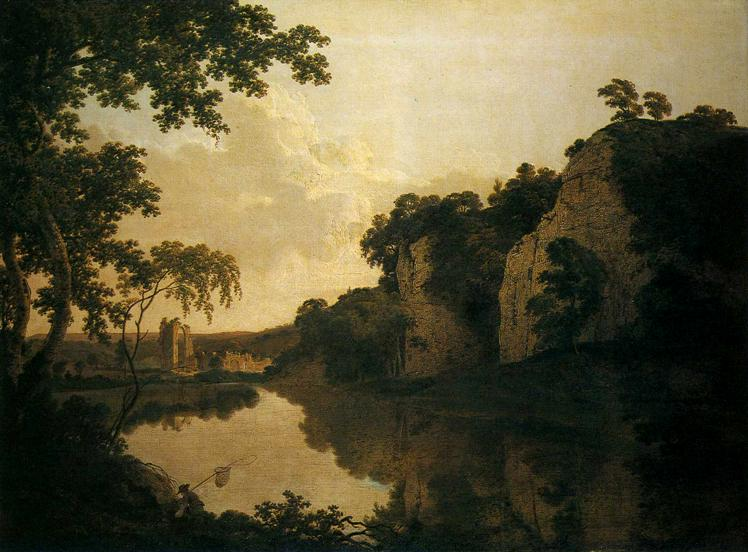
Landscape with Dale Abbey and Church Rocks. c.1785. Joseph Wright of Derby

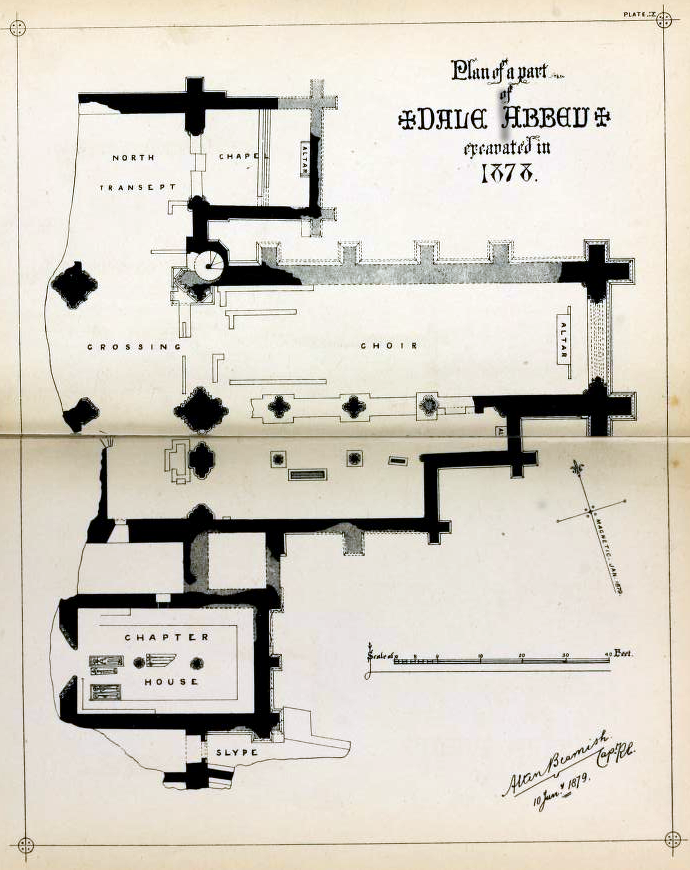
Plan of Dale Abbey, as uncovered in the excavations of 1878.

The decay of the abbey buildings was intentional, as the commissioners had the roof removed to make it uninhabitable, thus hurrying the former chapter on to their new homes. However, Dale seems to have suffered more than most from use as a convenient quarry for new buildings. It was probably Sir Henry Sacheverell, the steward, who removed to Morley church a large part of the cloister, with painted glass, an arch and a tomb slab. Sir Henry Willoughby used a large quantity of stone from Dale to build a wall to surround Risley Hall. Local antiquaries found evidence of the reuse of stone from Dale in mason's marks on local buildings, notably sixteen such marks on a single building in Stanton by Dale, probably the work of Michael Willoughby in the late 16th century. One even turned up on a lock on the Erewash Canal.

A number of houses at Dale incorporate stone from the abbey. The ground floor of the northern end of Friar House, for example, is built of dressed stone, contrasting with the timber framing of the rest of the building. Abbey House incorporates a large section of abbey masonry which has escaped dispersal, a chimney and fireplaces, thought to be part of the abbey kitchen. However, the abbey still had a considerable amount above ground in 1727, when it was drawn for Samuel and Nathaniel Buck's Views of Ruins of Castles and Abbeys in England. While the great east window was much as today, the entire south wall of the nave still stood, large parts of the adjoining claustral buildings were recognisable and the gateway to a garden or close on the north side of the church was visible.

In 1730 William Stukeley found the kitchen, hall (presumably the refectory), abbot's parlour in good condition, with ceilings still panelled in oak, and a gatehouse. He made a plan that was very rough but nevertheless gave a clear idea of the surviving abbey church and cloisters. On an earlier visit, before 1724, he had been more interested in the hermitage, which he illustrated for his Itinerarium curiosum

The decay of the building in the mid-18th century must have been very rapid. A landscape featuring the abbey painted by Joseph Wright of Derby in the 1780s makes clear that the east window was the most striking feature of the site. In 1789 John Byng discovered:

"Of all that is described in the print [Buck's], as existing only 6o years ago, (belonging to noblemen, to whom we join an idea of taste) nothing now remains but the lofty arch, which P. did not walk down to, but I took post as near as I dared from a vicious bull, and executed a drawing with more success (I think) than usual. Indeed this bull was its only guard: and I must again express my wonted surprise that a nobleman (of taste I have heard Ld. Stamford to be) who owns, and sometimes visits it, shou'd not enclose, and plant about it; and then it wou'd appear to great advantage."

James Pilkington's comments of the same year confirm Byng's impression:

According to tradition the church at Dale was a very grand and magnificent building. It contained several large windows on the north and south sides, and one at the east end in the chancel, which was very spacious and lofty. The arch is yet standing. It is nearly perfect and looks very beautiful.

So by this date the building looked very much as it does today: reduced to its east window and a few less obvious traces, like the kitchen chimney at Abbey House, with only footings to mark its former extent. There was a superstition that if the arch collapsed the village would be subject to tithes.

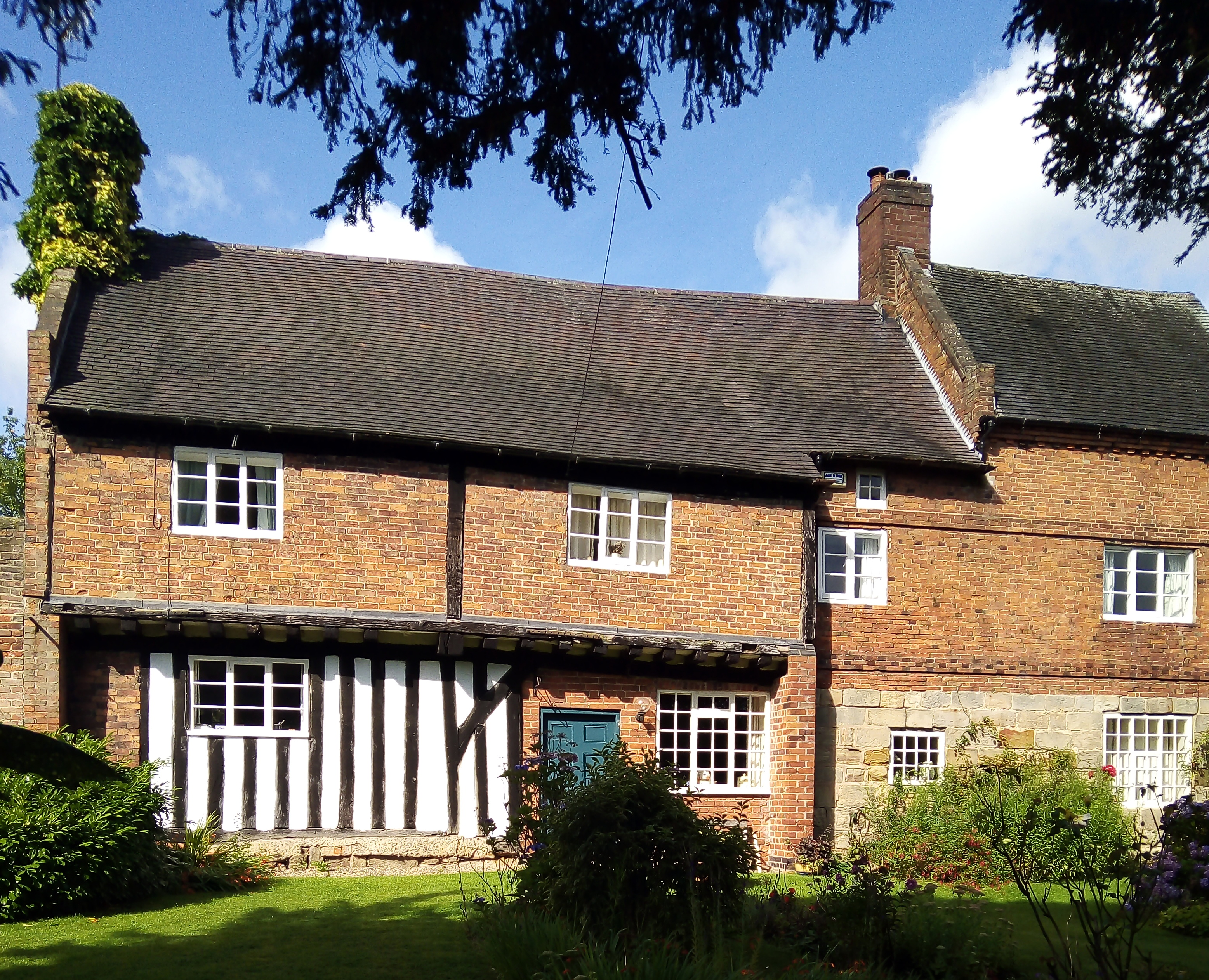
Friars House.

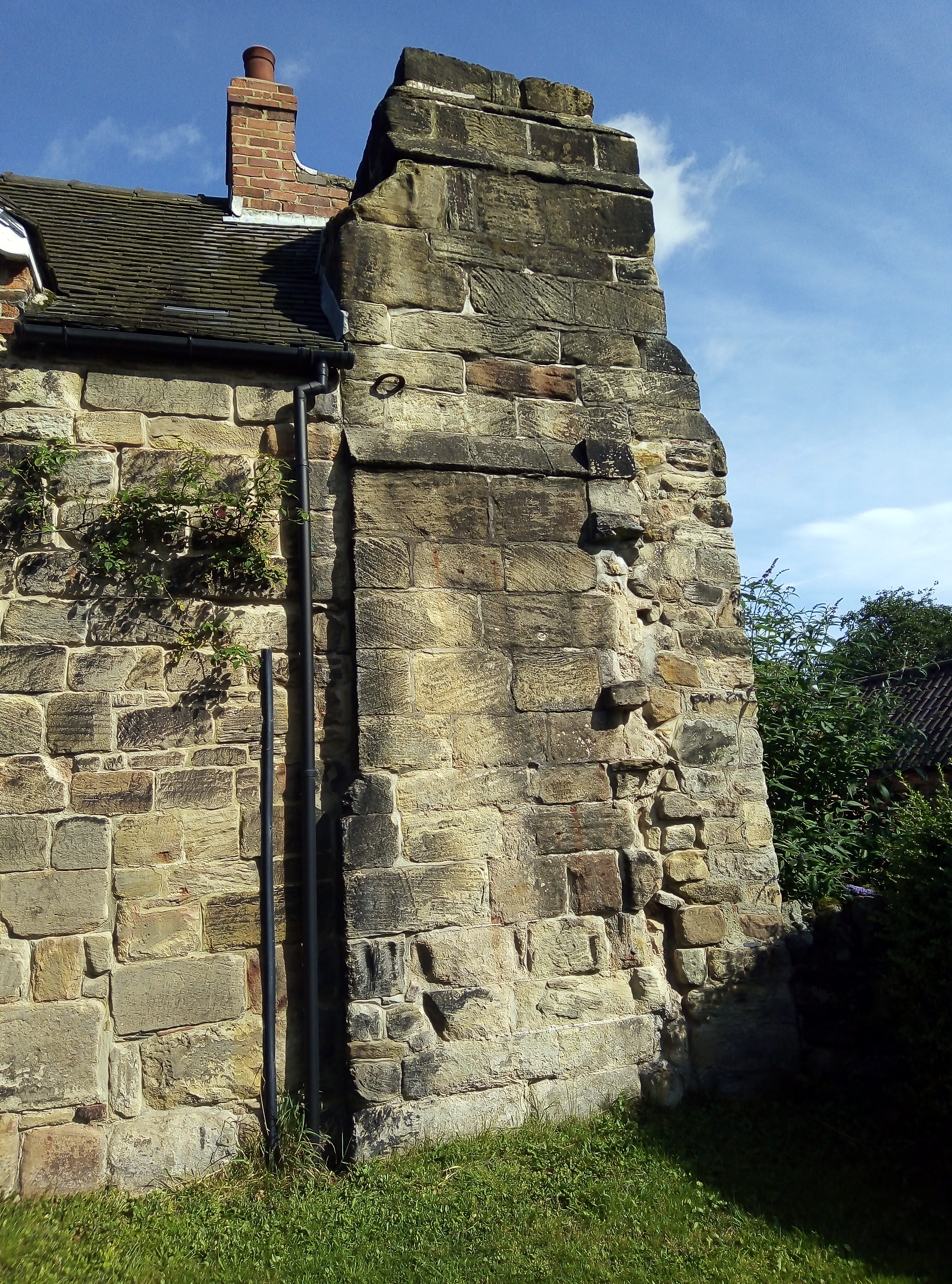
Southern end of Abbey House.

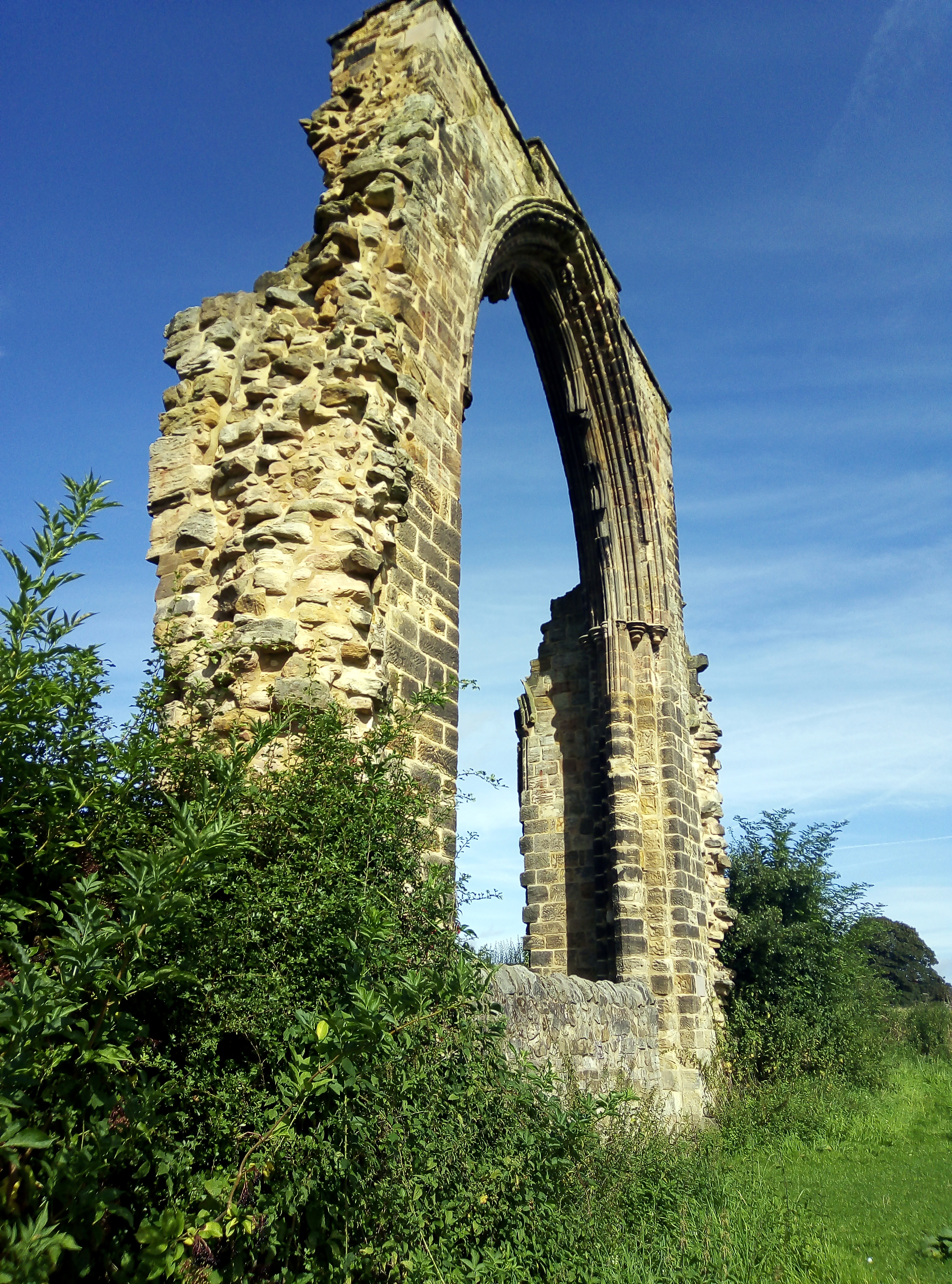
External view of the chancel east window.

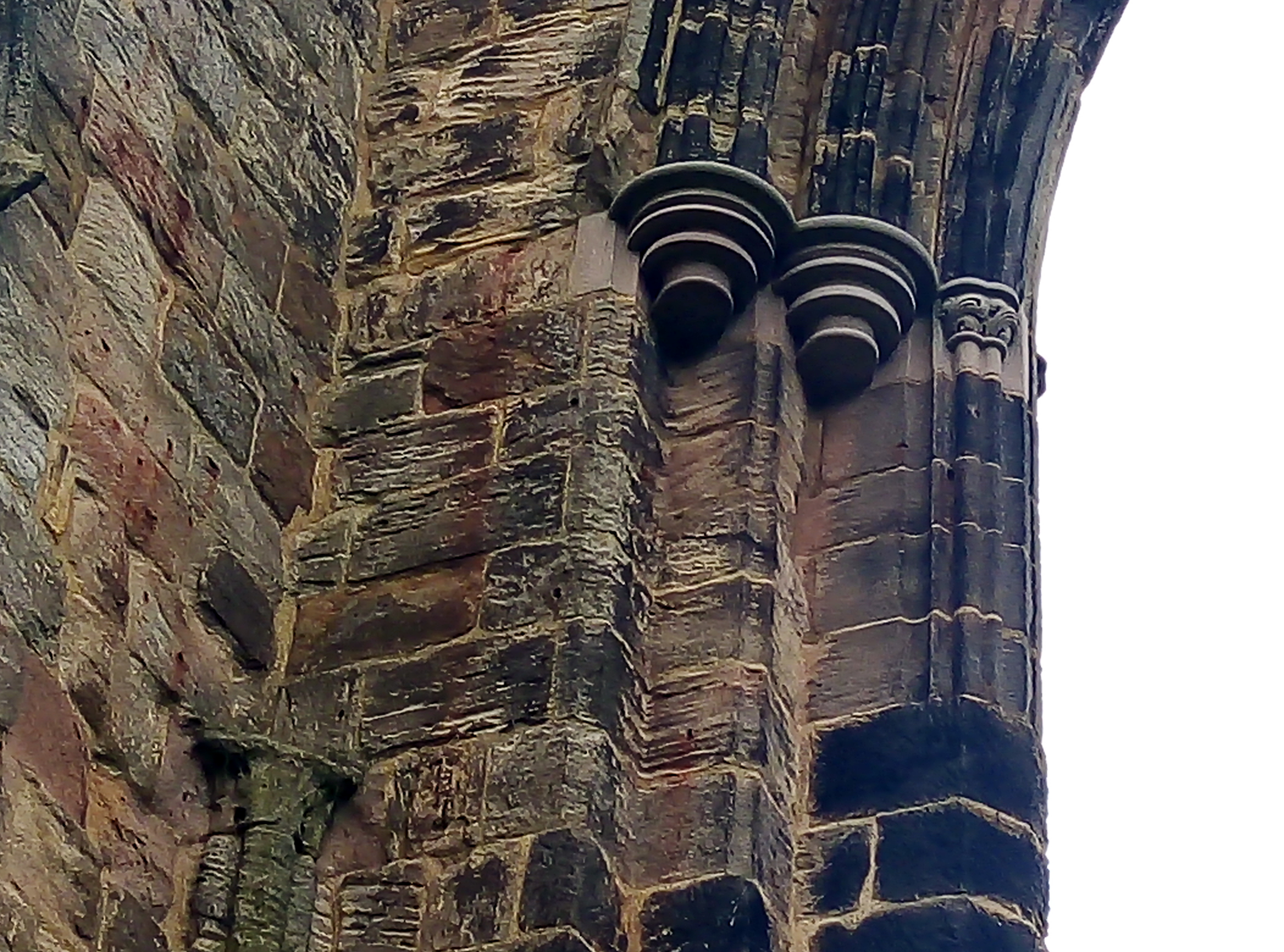
Internal view of the east window, showing moulding and other decoration.

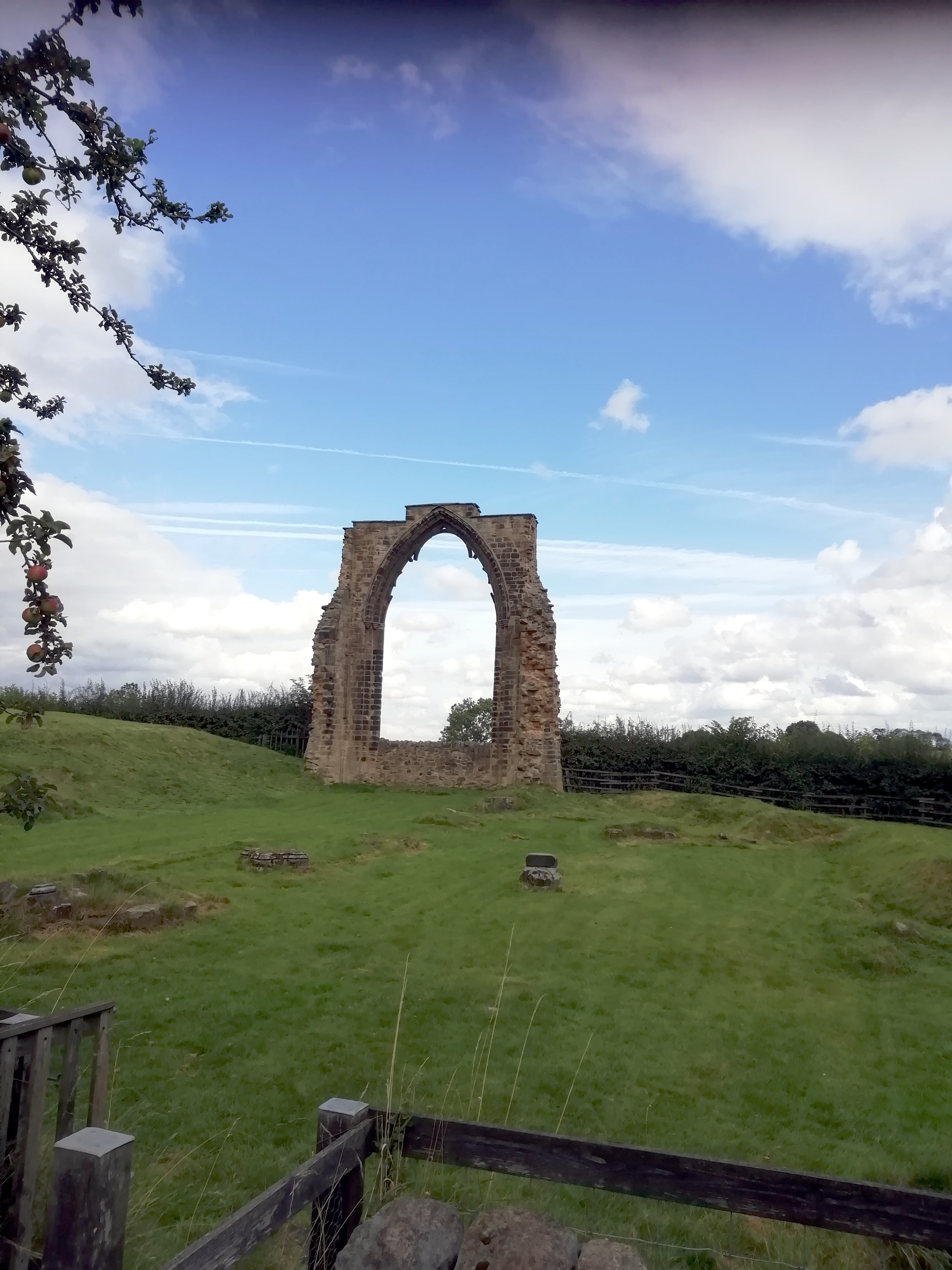
South east part of the ruins, showing the outlines of the chancel and south chancel aisle, south transept in the foreground.

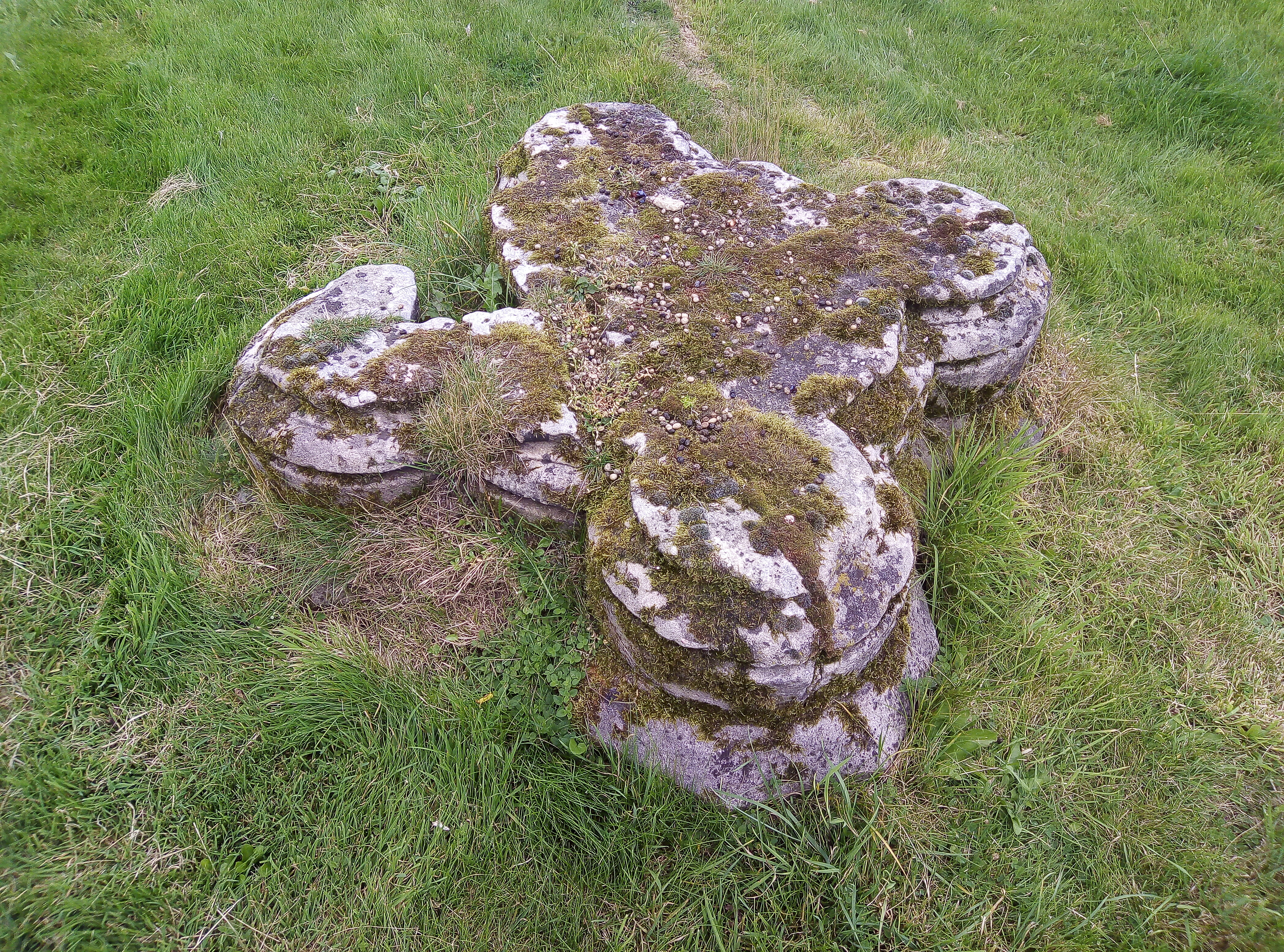
Base of a column that stood at the south east corner of the crossing, one of the four main supports for the central tower.

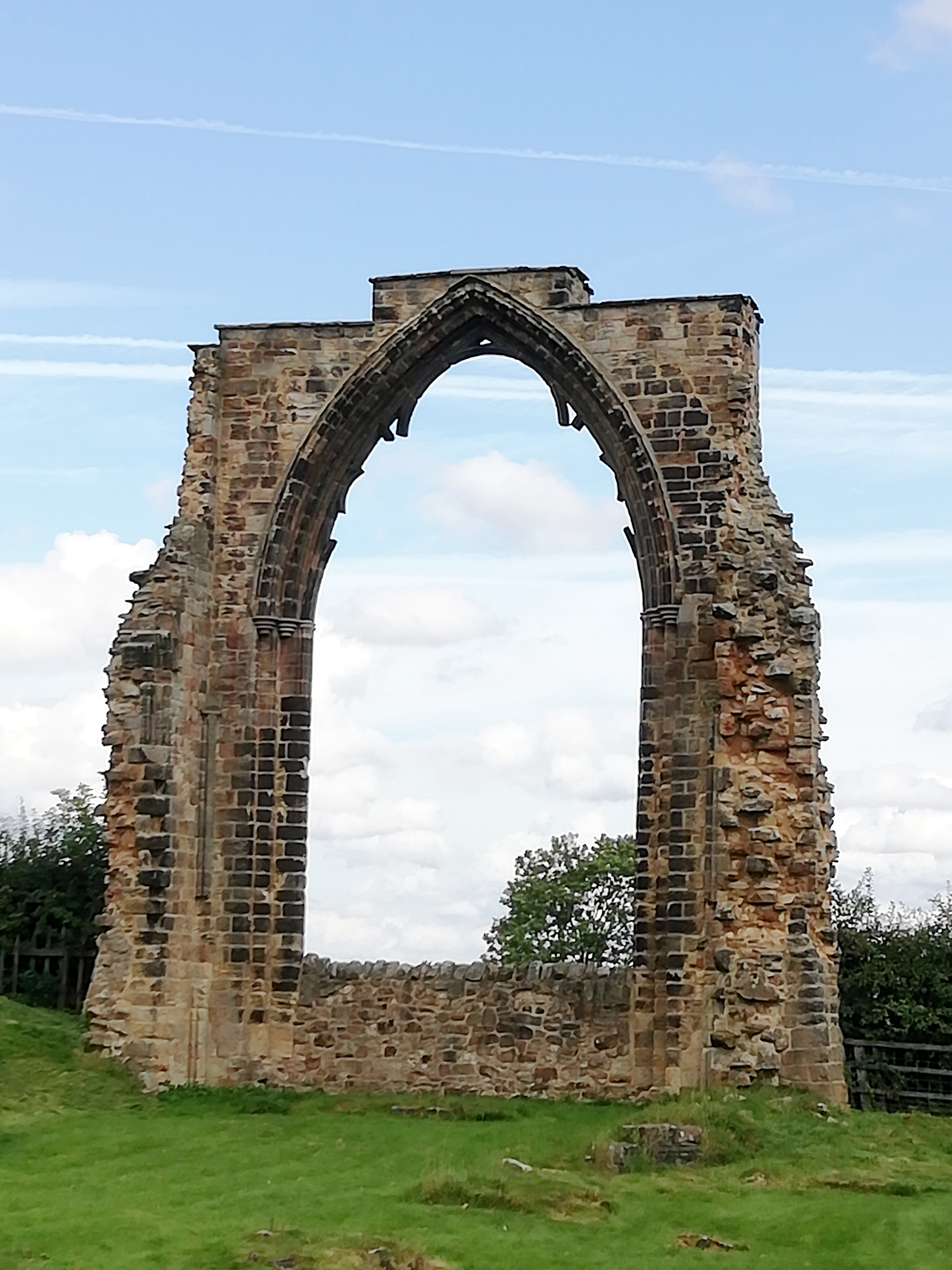
View of the east window from the interior. A small part of the return of the north chancel wall is visible on the left.

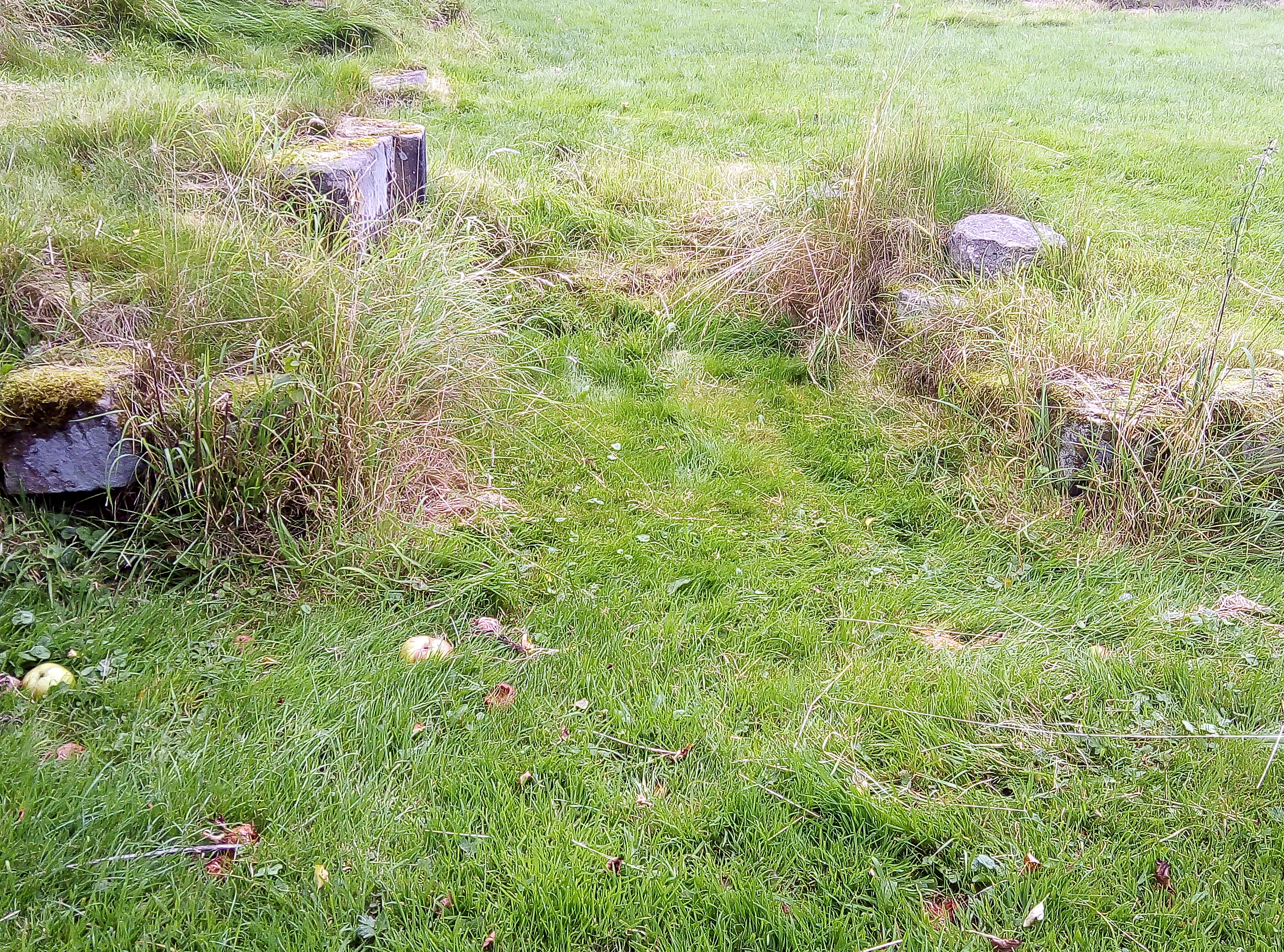
Remains of the stairs used by the canons to enter the abbey church for night worship.

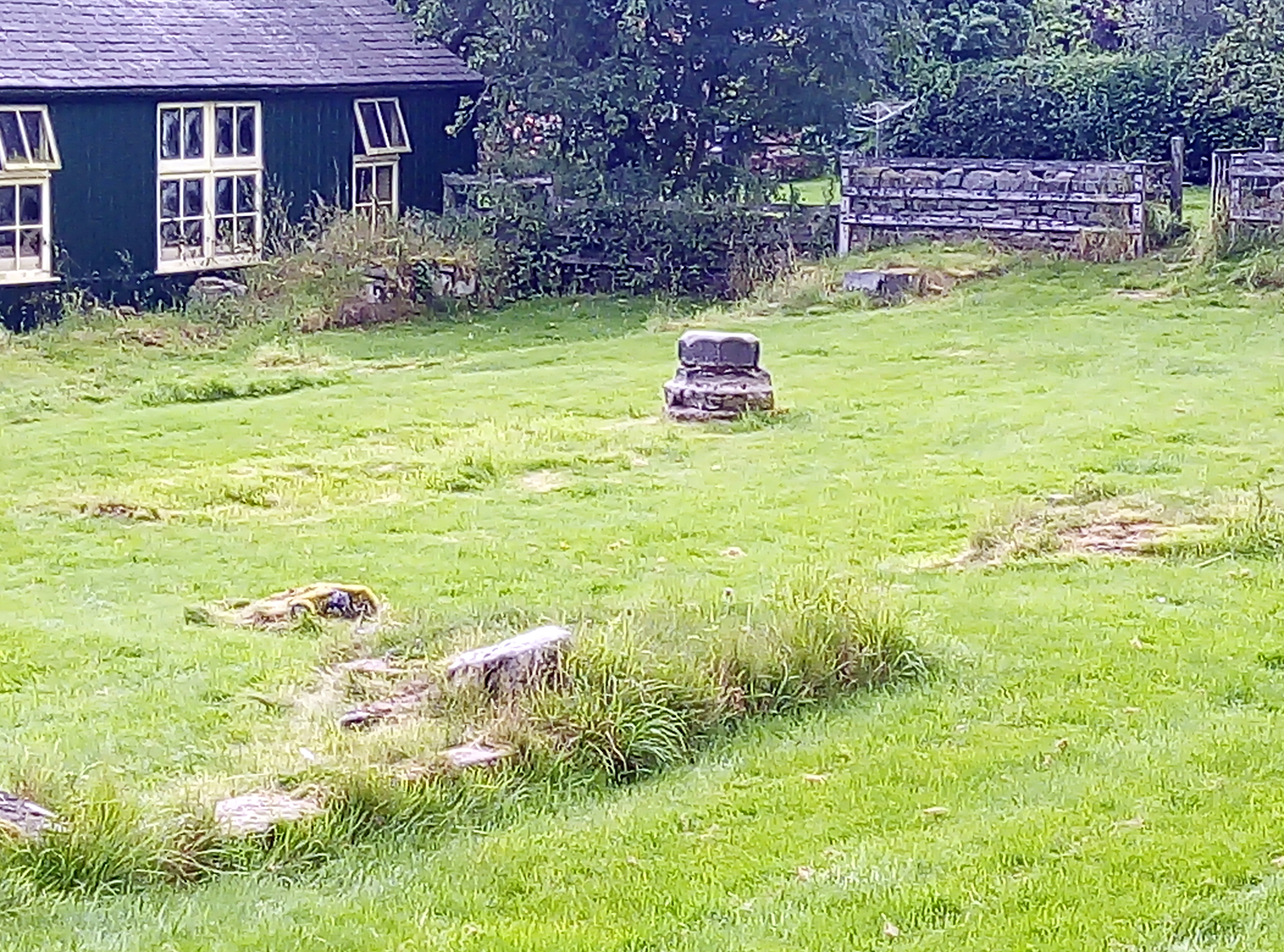
Footings of south transept and base of a column. The shed in the background is the museum, on the site of the chapter house.

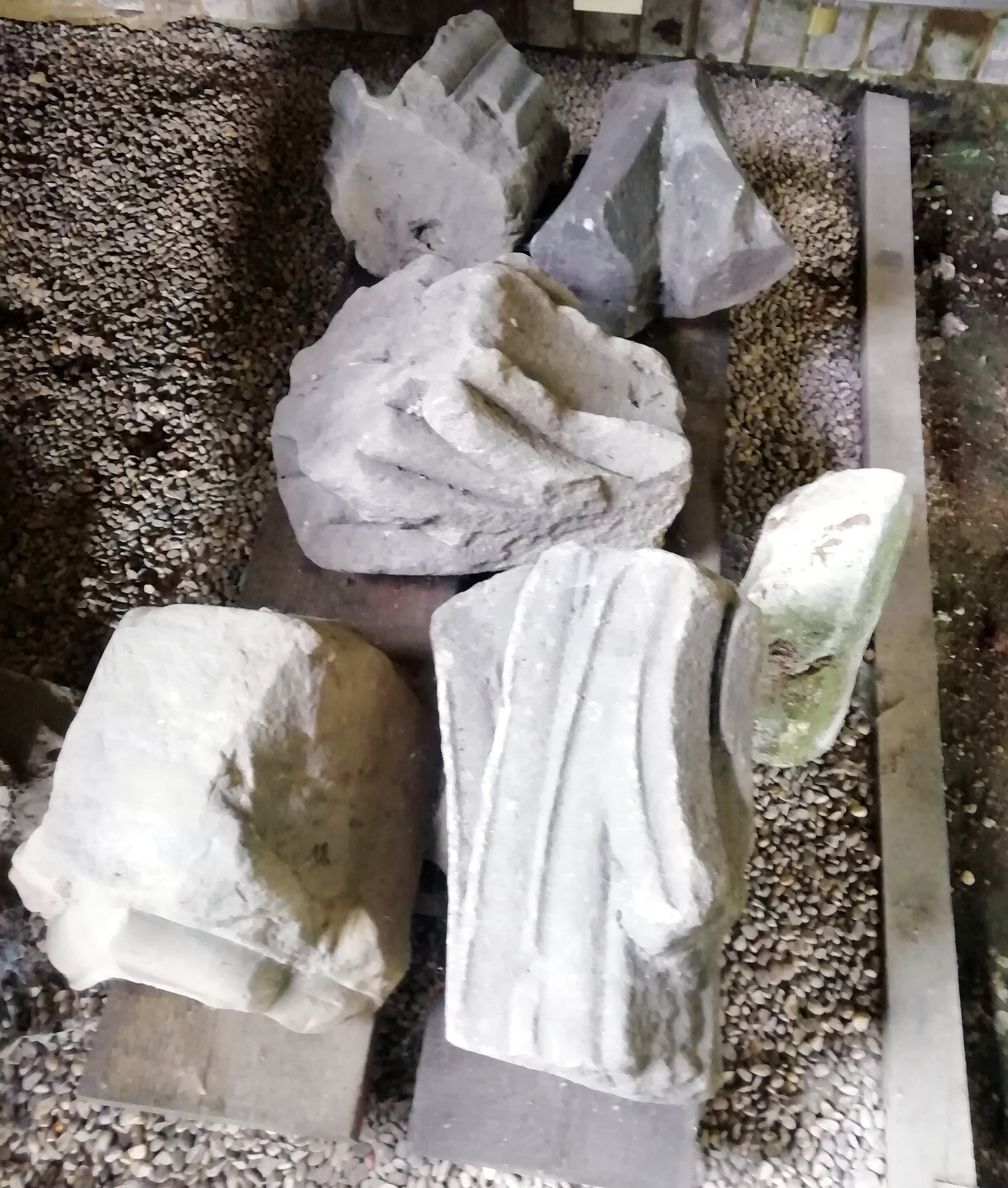
Parts of the roof vaulting of the chapter house.

== See also ==
- Grade I listed buildings in Derbyshire
- Listed buildings in Dale Abbey
