= Silk Engineering =

- Company type: Private
- Industry: Motorcycle
- Founded: 1976–1979
- Founder: George Silk
- Defunct: 1979
- Fate: Ceased motorcycle production
- Headquarters: Darley Abbey, Derbyshire, United Kingdom
- Key people: George Silk and Maurice Patey
- Products: Motorcycles

Silk Engineering was a British motorcycle manufacturer established by George Silk and Maurice Patey and based at Darley Abbey, Derbyshire. They produced Silk 700S two-stroke motorcycles until 1979. Problems with spare parts and rising costs led to the company ceasing manufacture.

== History ==
Silk was founded in the late 1960s by George Silk, a Scott motorcycle enthusiast who worked for Derbyshire Scott specialist Tom Ward. George Silk developed a racing motorcycle by fitting a Scott engine into a Spondon frame. Following some success with a Silk Special at the Barbon Hill Climb in 1970, Silk began planning a road-going prototype with his business partner Maurice Patey. They set up Silk Engineering and began providing a spares and repair service for Scott motorcycle owners. They also offered a range of modifications to improve the reliability and performance of Scotts, as well as improving the lubrication and gas flow. Silk exhibited the prototype at the Racing and Sporting Motorcycle Show in London in 1971. Orders exceeded his capability to produce them but he hand-built 21 Silk-Scott Specials between 1971 and 1975. The supply of Scott engines was limited, therefore customers were asked to find their own.

Matt Holder, who had bought the rights to the Scott engines, disputed the use of the Scott trademark and prevented Silk from making Scott engines under licence, forcing Silk to develop his own. A new two stroke engine was developed by David Midgelow (from Rolls-Royce engineering) and George Silk, and they had assistance from two-stroke expert Gordon Blair of Queen's University, Belfast, who optimised the porting with the aid of specialist computer programs.

== The Silk 700S ==
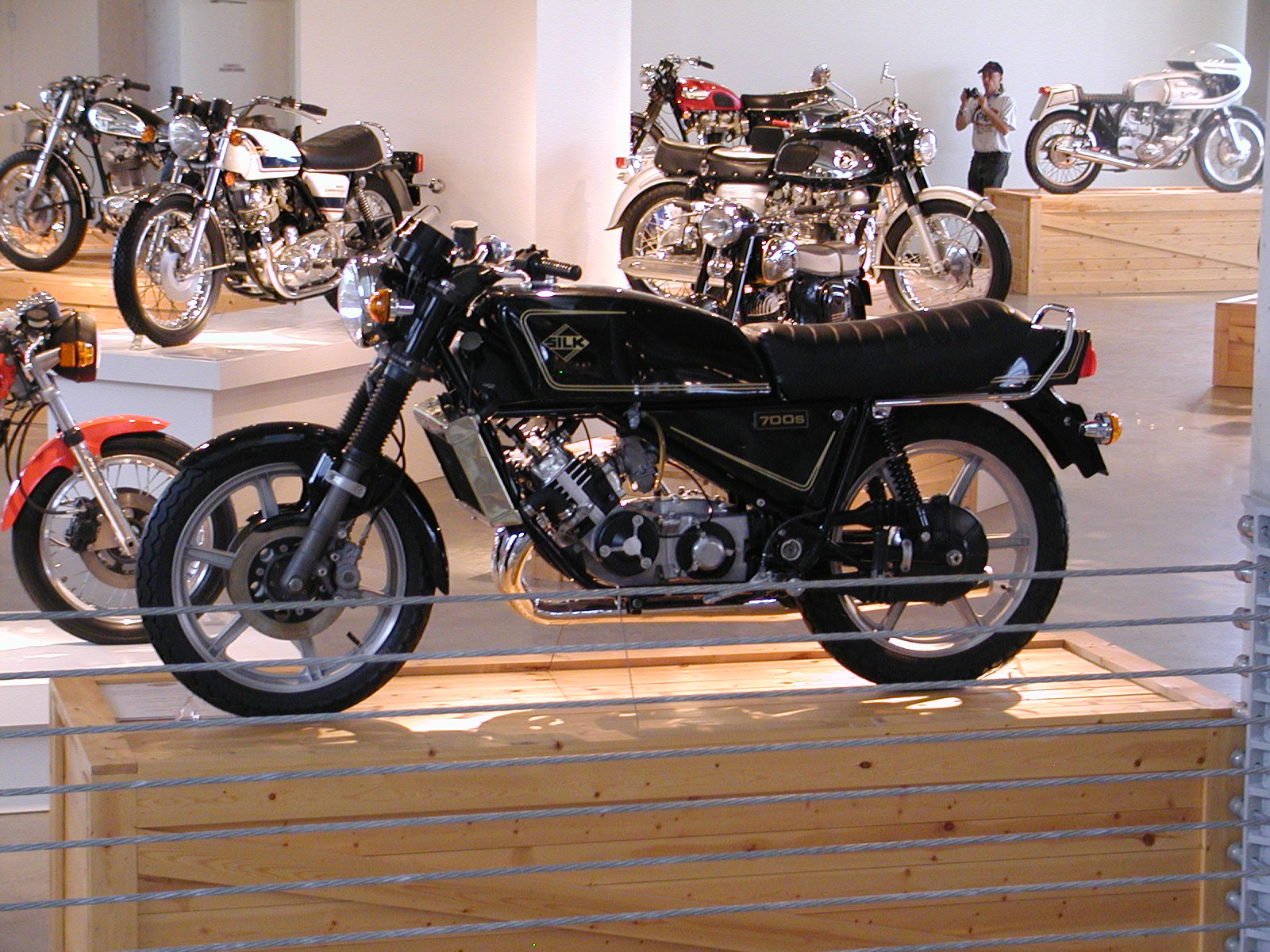
SILK 700S

The Silk 700S was launched in 1975 and featured the new engine in a steel tubular frame made by Spondon Engineering of Derbyshire, who also made the forks, yokes, disc/drum brakes and rotors. Priced at £1,355 it was the most expensive production motorcycle of the time. The 700S continued to be developed at the Darley Abbey works in Derbyshire, along with the SPR Production Racing version. Production was slow, with just two motorcycles a week coming off the production line. Customers could select from five colour schemes – British Racing Green, metallic blue or green, black with gold coachlines or plain red. There was also a Scott special edition in purple and cream – and a special scheme similar to Silk Cut cigarettes, which were popular at the time.

The engine had no water pump, using instead a thermo-syphon cooling system. Coolant in the cylinder jackets absorbed engine heat and rose convectively via a rubber tube to the radiator. The cooled liquid was denser and sank through another tube to the base of the cylinders. (The thermo-syphon system was used in early cars and static engines, but became insufficient as power outputs increased. However, the system worked well enough in the Scott engine).

The final drive chain was fully enclosed, with the upper and lower runs being encased in "telescopic" rubber gaiters.

The Silk Engineering company was taken over by the Kendal-based Furmanite International Group in 1976 who continued production of the Silk 700S and in 1977 it was upgraded to the 700S Mk2, which Silk called the Sabre. Improvements from the Mk 1 included finned cylinder barrels, a redesigned seat, instruments and rear light nacelle. Porting and timing revisions plus a higher compression boosted power to a more respectable 48 hp, but the price continued to rise. In 1978 the 100th Silk motorcycle was produced and production continued until December 1979 when Silk realised they were losing £200 with every motorcycle sold.

== Silk 500 ==
The last Silk motorcycle ever built was Clive Worrall's 500 cc model based on a prototype that was never produced. It was used as a competition prize for Classic Bike magazine.

== Silk 350 ==
The Silk 350 was a two-stroke Trials prototype that was developed but never produced commercially.
