= Silk 700S =

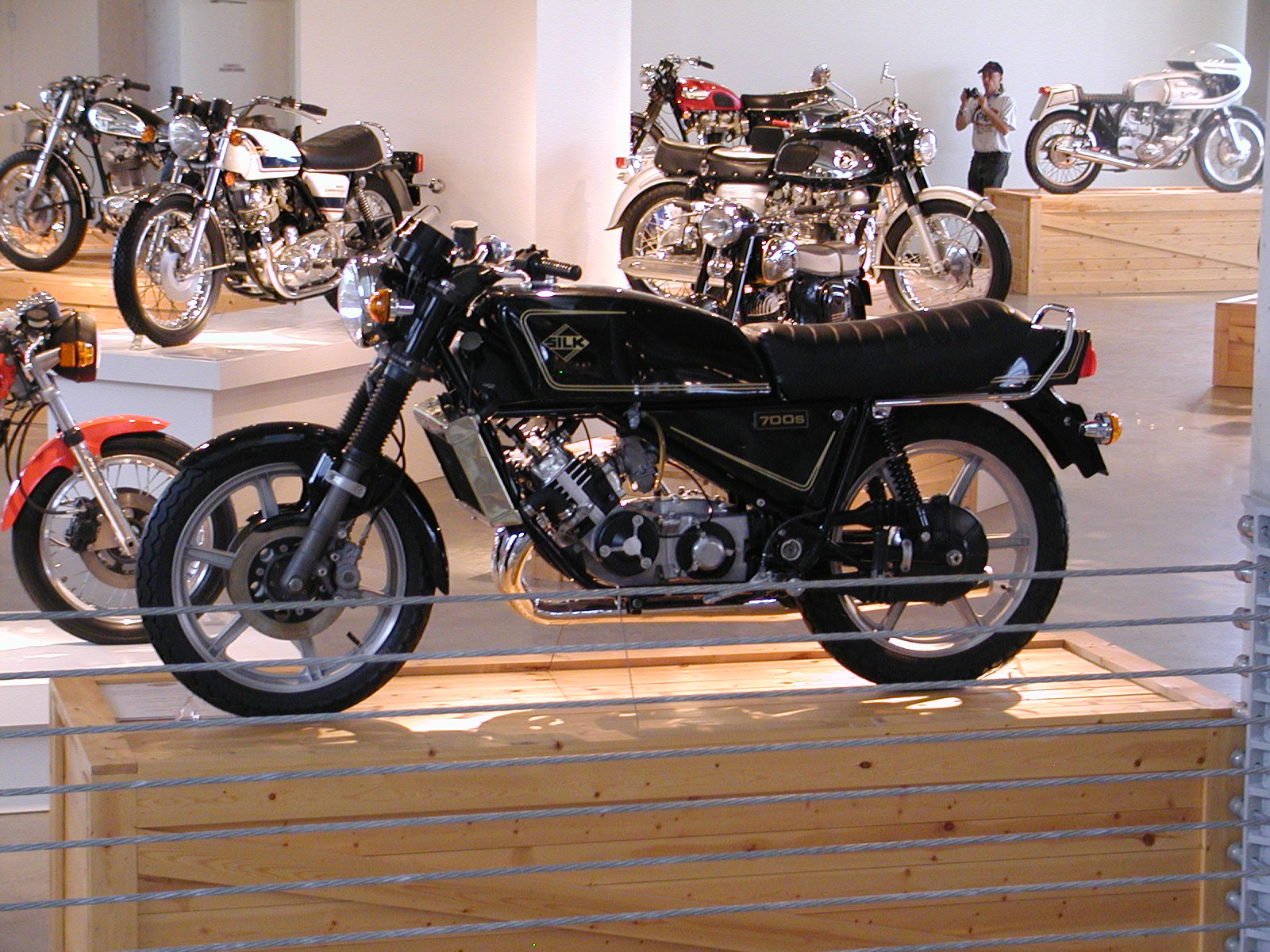
- Manufacturer: Silk Engineering
- Also called: Silk Sabre
- Production: 1975 - 1979
- Engine: 653cc water cooled two-stroke twin
- Top speed: 110mph (177 km/h)
- Power: 54bhp @ 6,000rpm (MK2)
- Transmission: four speed
- Suspension: 39mm gaitered telescopic front forks, enclosed Girling twin shocks rear
- Brakes: 254mm front disc, twin piston caliper, 180mm drum rear
- Tires: 3.60 X18 inch front, 4.10 X 18 inch rear, Dunlop TT100s
- Weight: 309 pounds (140 kg) (dry)

The Silk 700S was a British motorcycle made by Silk Engineering between 1975 and 1979 in Darley Abbey, Derbyshire, UK.

== Development ==
The Silk 700S was launched in 1975 and featured a new engine based on the two stroke engine from the Scott Flying Squirrel in a specially designed steel tubular frame made by Spondon of Derbyshire, who also made the forks. At a cost of £1355 it was more expensive than most other production motorcycles of the time. Right from the start the Silk 700S featured state of the art electronic ignition and had a power-to-weight ratio combined with excellent handling that enabled it to compete with some of the best road bikes of the time. Top speed was 110 mph. The bike did not have an electric start; the kick-starting technique took some practice.

The 700S continued to be developed at the Darley Abbey works in Derbyshire, along with the SPR Production Racing version. Production was slow, with just two motorcycles a week coming off the production line. Customers could select from five colour schemes - British Racing Green, metallic blue or green, black with gold coachlines or plain red. There was also a Scott special edition in purple and cream - and a special scheme similar to Silk Cut cigarettes, which were popular at the time.

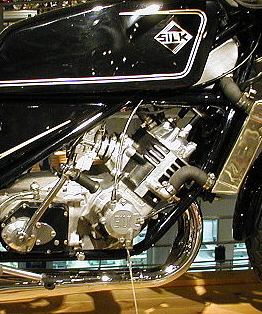

As a precision engineering company, Silk were able to make the piston port twin-cylinder engine in-house at their Derbyshire workshops. The pressed up, four roller bearing crank had the primary drive taken from the crankshaft centre, to an inverted Velocette prefix 5 four-speed gearbox. The two-stroke engine ran on a 50:1 petroil mix, with a separate oil tank reserved for main bearing lubrication fed by Silk's own design of oil pump. When the rider opened the throttle the oil flowed faster, ensuring best possible lubrication. The engine's claimed 48 bhp was developed at 6,000rpm, giving good touring performance, and peak torque was at 3,000rpm, comparable to the Suzuki GT750. Twin siamesed exhaust pipes fed an Ossa silencer. The wheels on early models were 18 inch Borrani alloy rims, replaced with six-spoke Campagnolo cast wheels on later Silks. The final drive chain was enclosed for longer life.

The engine had no water pump, using instead a thermo-syphon cooling system. Coolant in the cylinder jackets absorbed engine heat and rose convectively via a rubber tube to the radiator. The cooled liquid was denser and returned through another tube to the base of the cylinders. The radiators on the early models were either from Scotts or Velocette LE's.

The Silk Engineering company was taken over by the Kendal based Furmanite International Group in 1976 who continued production of the Silk 700S and in 1977 it was upgraded to the 700S Mk2, which Silk called the Sabre. Improvements from the Mk 1 included finned cylinder barrels, a redesigned seat, instruments, and rear light nacelle. In 1978 the 100th Silk motorcycle was produced and production continued until December 1979 when Silk realised they were losing £200 with every motorcycle sold. In all, 138 Sabres were sold.
