= Flying squirrel (disambiguation) =

Flying squirrel is a tribe of 44 species of squirrel

Flying squirrel may also refer to:

- Forsythia (flying squirrel), a fossil flying squirrel
- Gliding possum, marsupials from Australia and New Guinea
- Rocky the Flying Squirrel, a title character from The Rocky and Bullwinkle Show
- The Richmond Flying Squirrels, the post-2009 name for the minor league baseball team previously known as the West Haven Yankees, formed in 1972
- The name of a takedown technique made famous by American Olympic Greco-Roman wrestler Ellis Coleman, who also shares the nickname
- A nickname for American Olympic gymnast Gabby Douglas
- A nickname of American professional baseball player Jeff McNeil
- The Scott Flying Squirrel motorcycle

== See also ==
- Flying squirrel typhus
