= Scott Flying Squirrel =

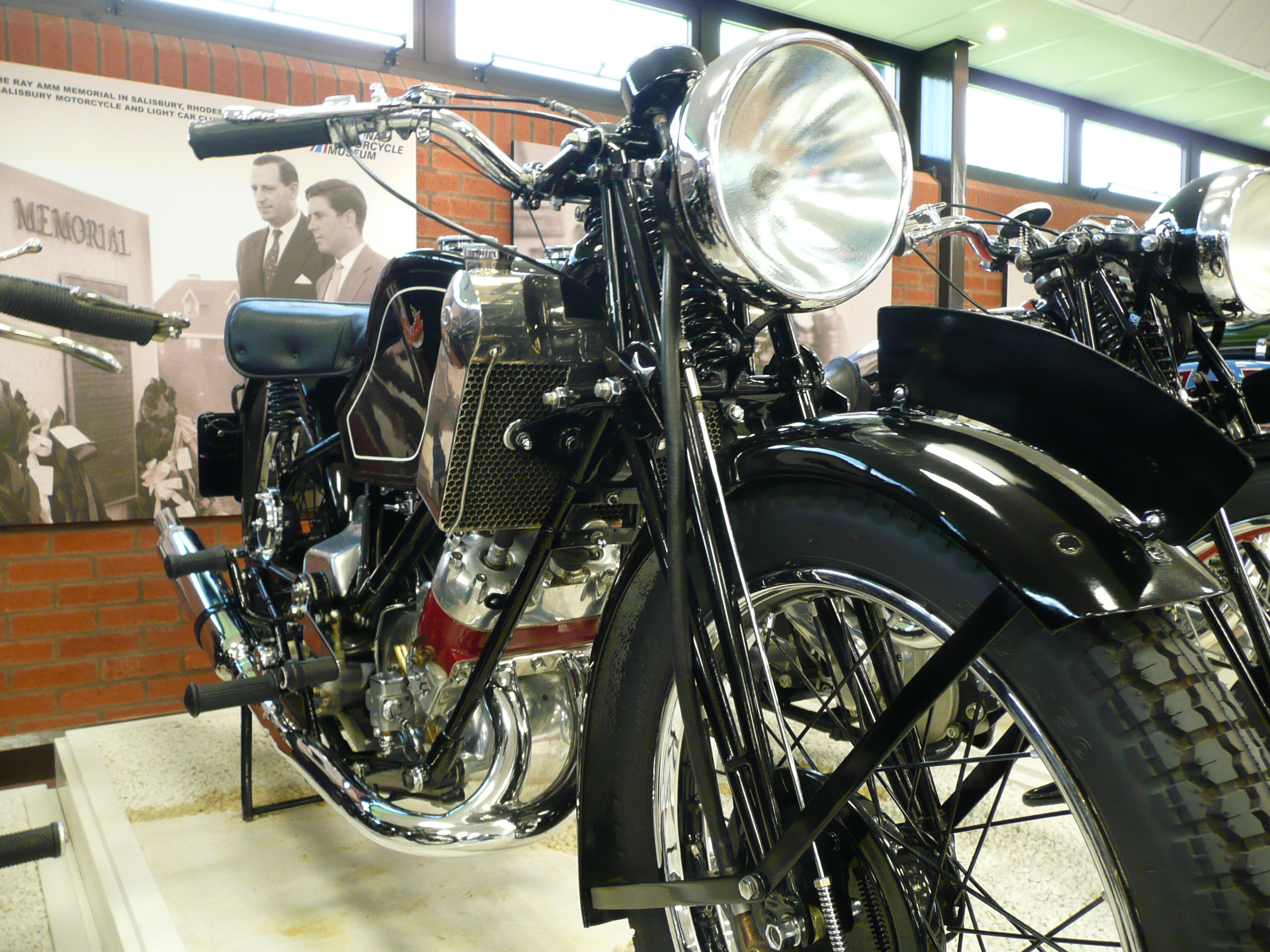
- Manufacturer: The Scott Motorcycle Company
- Production: 1926–1940
- Engine: 596 cc (36.4 cu in) water-cooled two-stroke twin
- Top speed: 70 mph (110 km/h)
- Transmission: Three speed with hand gear change
- Wheelbase: 55.5 inches (141 cm)
- Weight: 325 lb (147 kg) (dry)

The Scott Flying Squirrel was a motorcycle made by The Scott Motorcycle Company between 1926 and the outbreak of World War II. Production resumed after the War and continued until 1950.

== Development ==
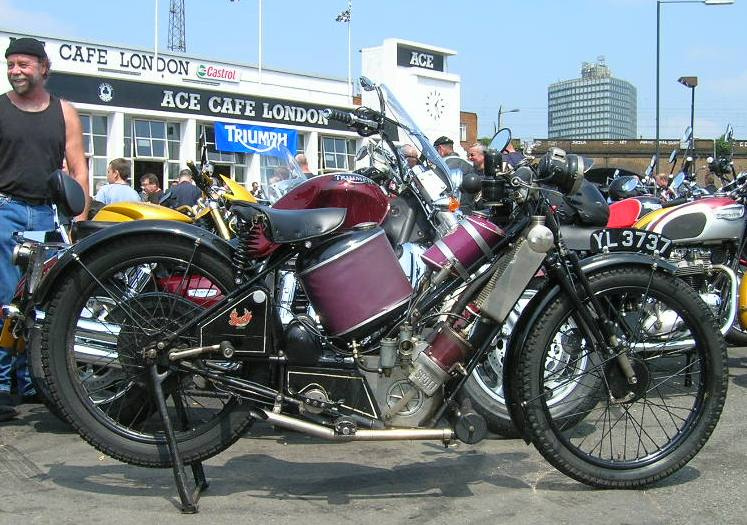
Side view of Scott Super Squirrel taken at the Ace Cafe

The Squirrel name was used for Scott motorcycles since 1921 but with the death of the founder Alfred Angas Scott in 1923 the unorthodox Scott two-stroke motorcycles began to become more conventional. Development of the three-speed Scott Flying Squirrel began in 1922 as the company was in severe debt and faced receivership. Launched at the 1926 Earls Court motorcycle show, the Flying Squirrel was expensive - nearly twice the cost of a sporting four-stroke motorcycle of the time. The unique water-cooled circulation used a convection method known as the thermosyphon system. The bottom end block was painted green for racing or red for road, and had a centrally positioned flywheel, twin inboard main bearings, overhung crankpins, and doors for easy access to the engine. The redesigned three-speed gearbox, multi-plate clutch and the repositioned magneto were all significant improvements.

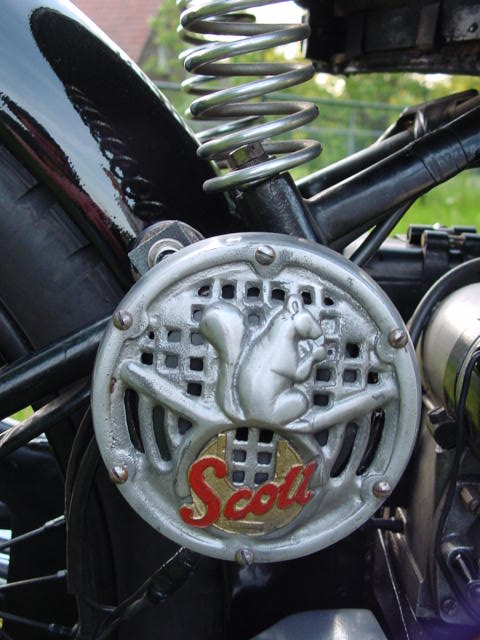
1932 Squirrel

In 1929 Scott achieved third place in the Isle of Man TT and launched a road going TT Replica Flying Squirrel. Following cost cutting the factory also launched a basic touring model in 1929 for under £70. Financial problems continued, however, and in 1931 Scott were unable to enter the TT or the Earls Court show. A three-cylinder prototype was developed but Scotts lacked the resources to develop it and on the outbreak of World War II production ended. Captain Tom Moore, who became famous at the age of 99 in 2020 for raising £33m for NHS Charities Together, won several trophies racing a Flying Squirrel as a young man; a motorcycle on display in Bradford Industrial Museum was later found to have formerly been his.

Between 1935 and 1938 the factory at Shipley in Yorkshire produced the B2592 air-cooled Aero engine, based on the Scott Flying Squirrel motorcycle unit. A 25 hp (19 kW) version was also specifically developed to power the notoriously dangerous Flying Flea aircraft.

In 1950 the rights were bought by the Birmingham based Aerco Company and in 1956 they produced what are known as the Birmingham Scotts.

After World War Two, production of the Flying Squirrel resumed in 1946 or '47 and continued until about 1950, although production output was limited and sales were few.

In the late 1970s, Silk Engineering produced the Silk 700S, which comprised an uprated Scott engine fitted into a modern Egli-type frame made by Spondon Engineering.

Enthusiasts have described the sound of a Flying Squirrel not as a typical engine roar, but as a "scalded cat" yowl.

== See also ==
- List of motorcycles of the 1920s
