= St Helen's Priory =

St Helen's Priory may refer to:

- St Helen's Priory, Derby
- St Helen's Priory, Isle of Wight
