= Darley Park =

Urban park located in England

Coordinates: 52.938°N 1.479°W

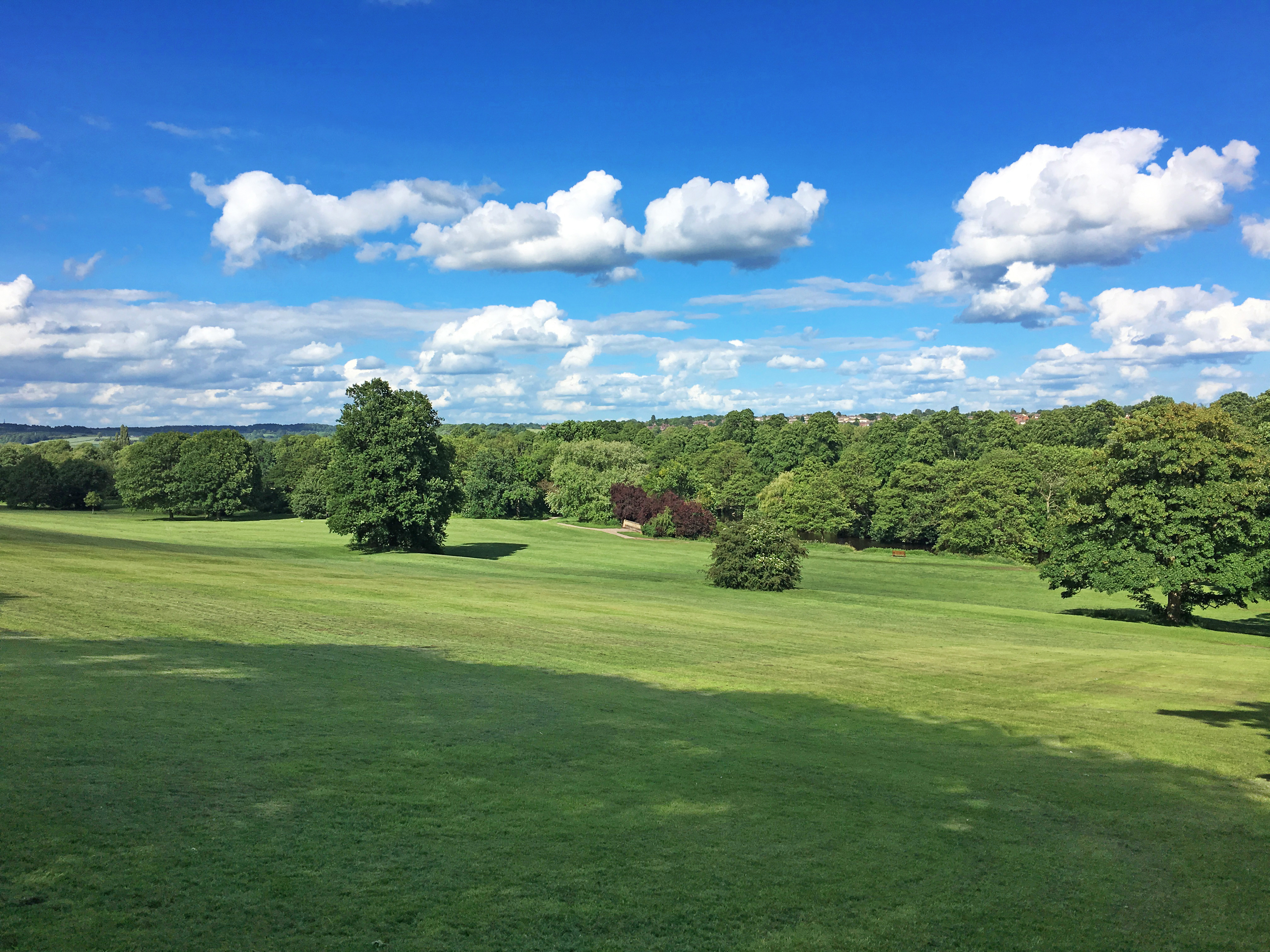
Darley Park, looking North East

Darley Park is an urban park on the banks of the River Derwent, just north of Derby city centre, England. It has a total area of 80 acres and forms the largest part of the Darley Open Spaces. The park is one of Derby's most popular outdoor spaces.

== Description ==
The name Darley Park is often used to describe all or the separate parts that make up the Darley Open Spaces; a number of adjacent urban park areas that lie on either side of the banks of the River Derwent, at the gateway to the Derwent Valley Mills World Heritage Site. They are Darley Park, Derwent Park, Parker’s Piece, Chester Green, Darley Fields and Nutwood Nature Reserve.

At 80 acres, Darley Park is the largest of the areas. It is formed largely of steep bank that has a rise from the river level of about 98 feet (30 m).

There are five main entrances to the Park, the closest to Derby city centre being at the southern point, off North Parade. Here there is also Handyside Bridge which offers a pedestrian route over to Parkers Piece and Chester Green.

Darley Park can also be accessed from the adjacent Derwent Park via pathways that lead from Duffield Road and Belper Road. There are two entrances from Darley Abbey Village; one off New Road and one at the northern point of the Park, next to Deans Field.

There are two official car parks for the park, at the Darley Road entrance and at Deans Field.

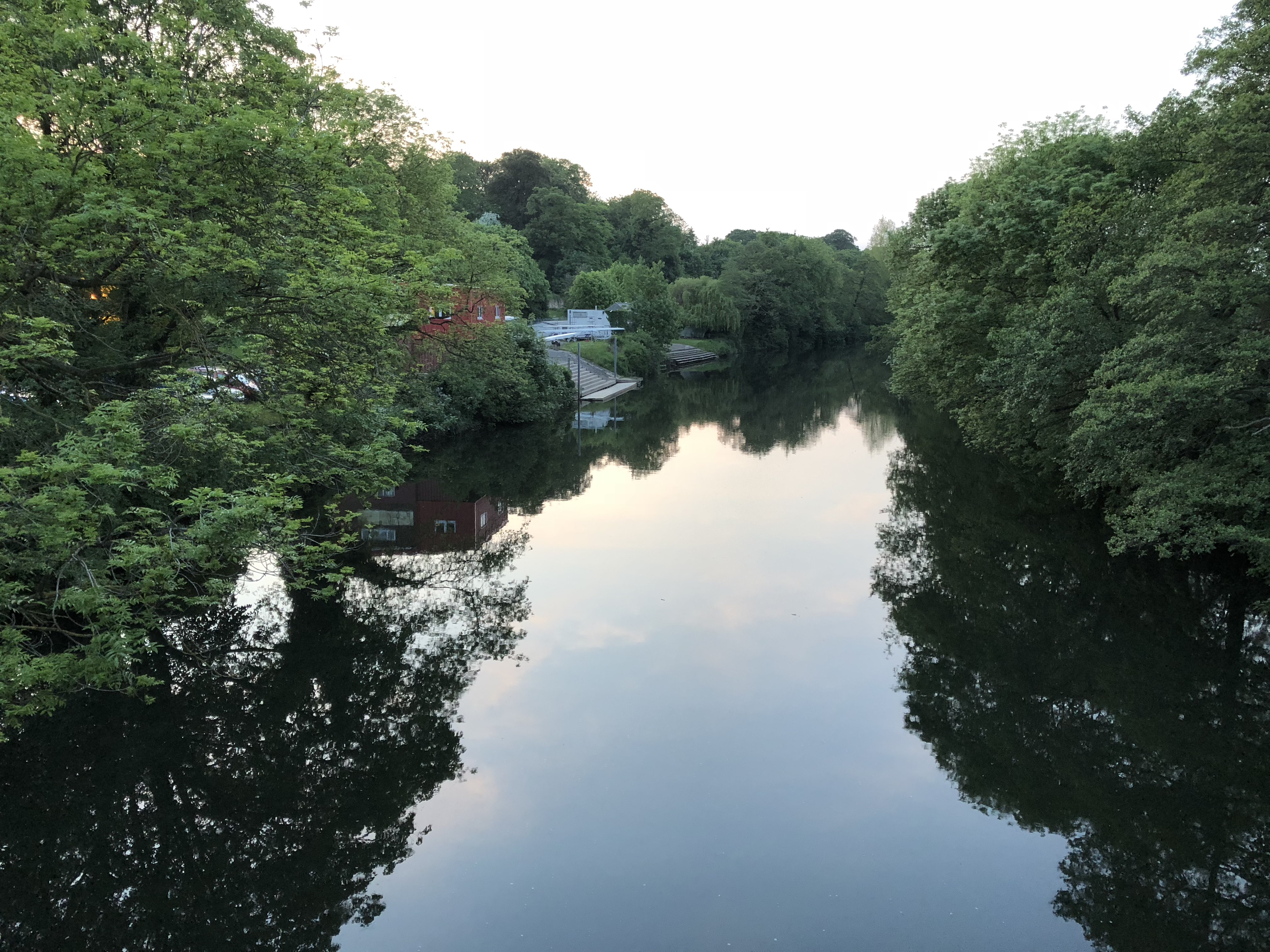

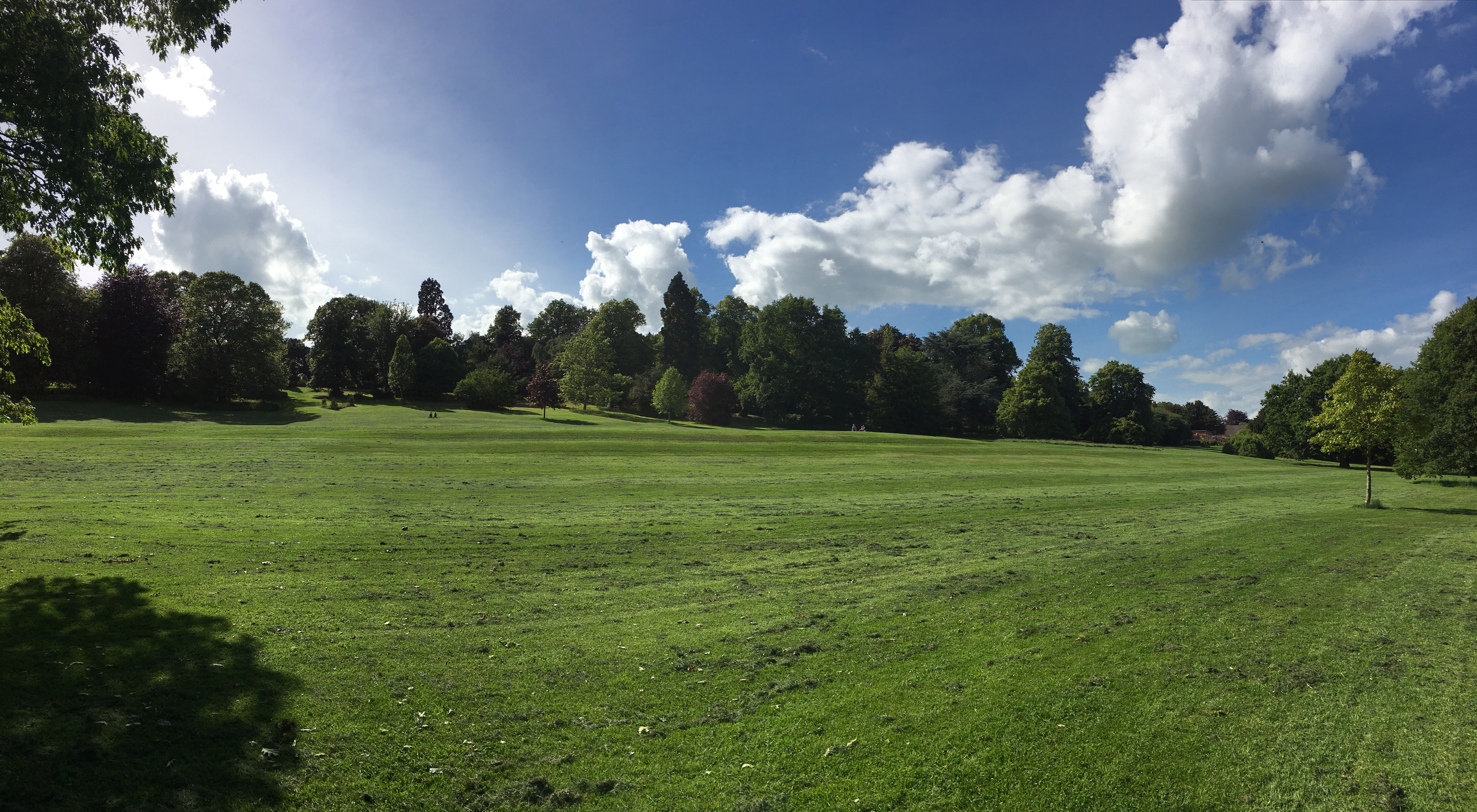

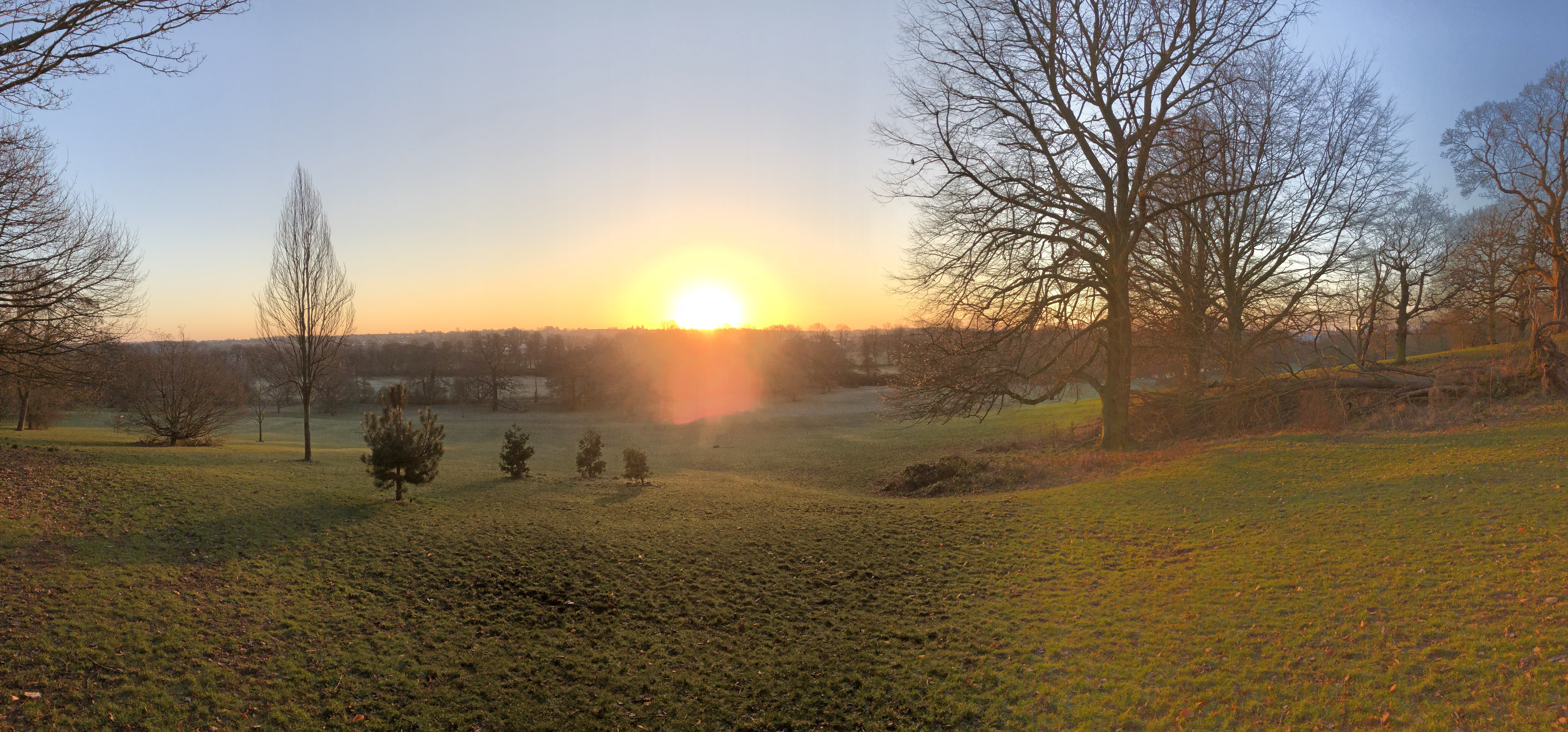

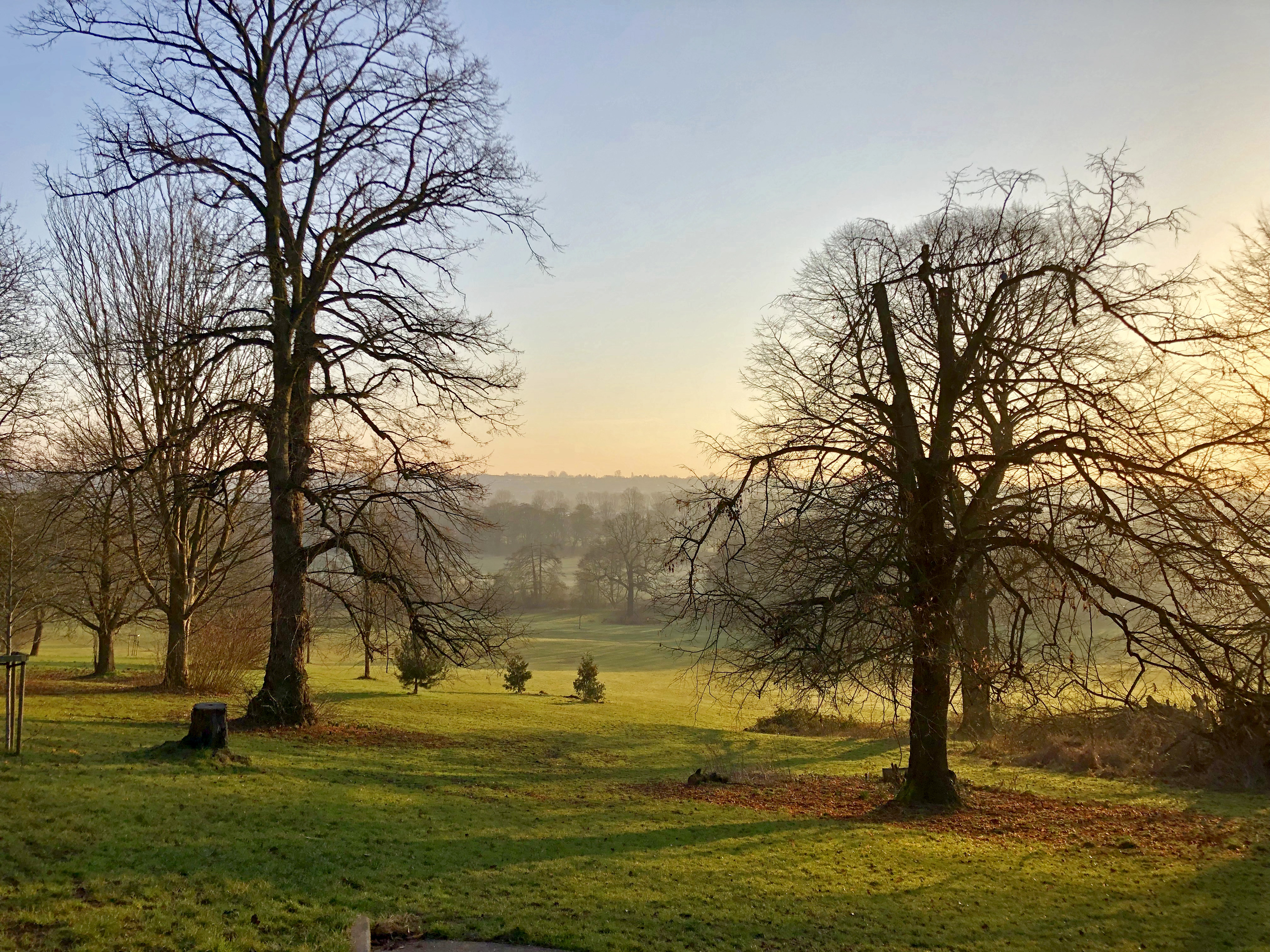

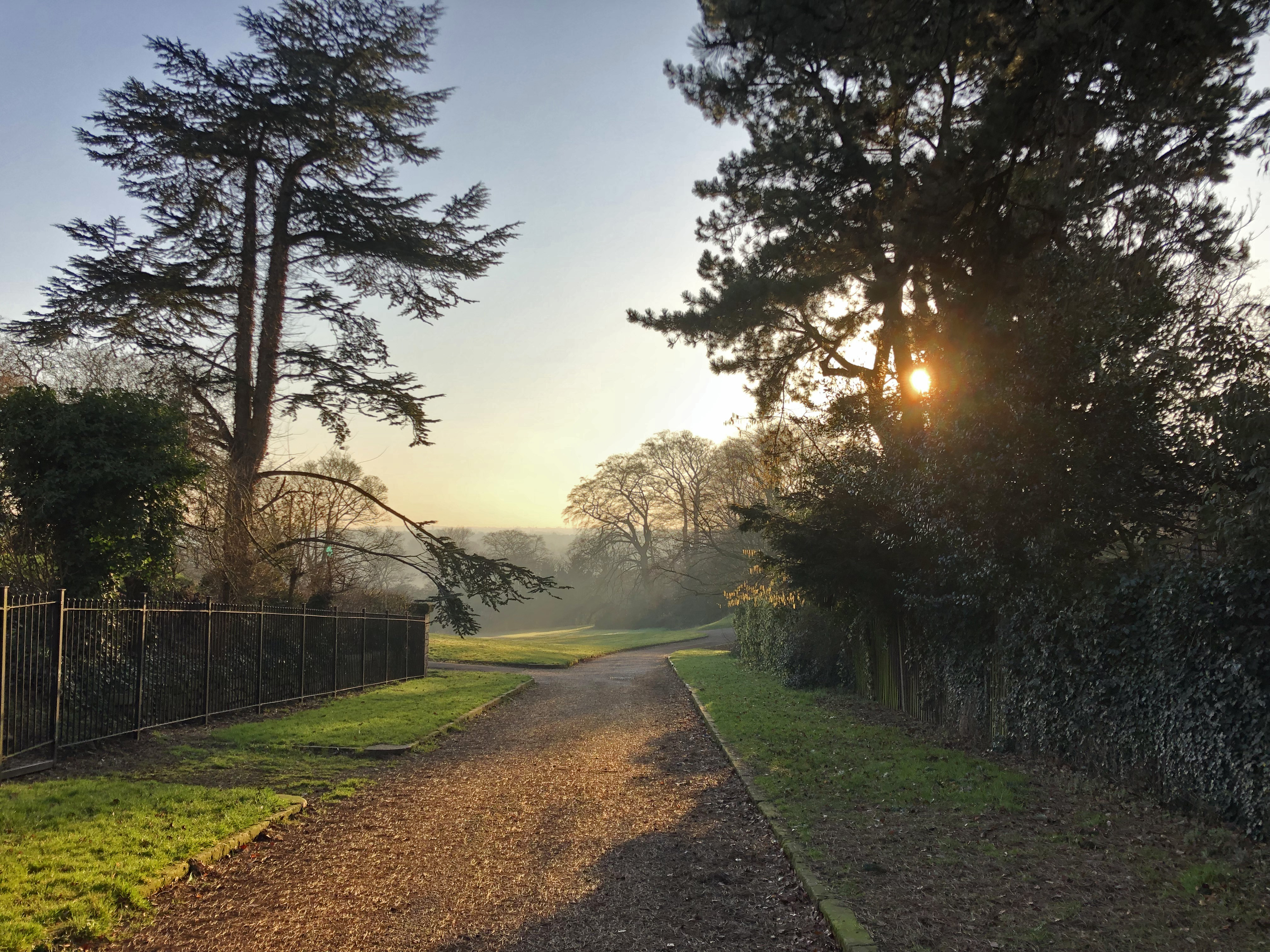

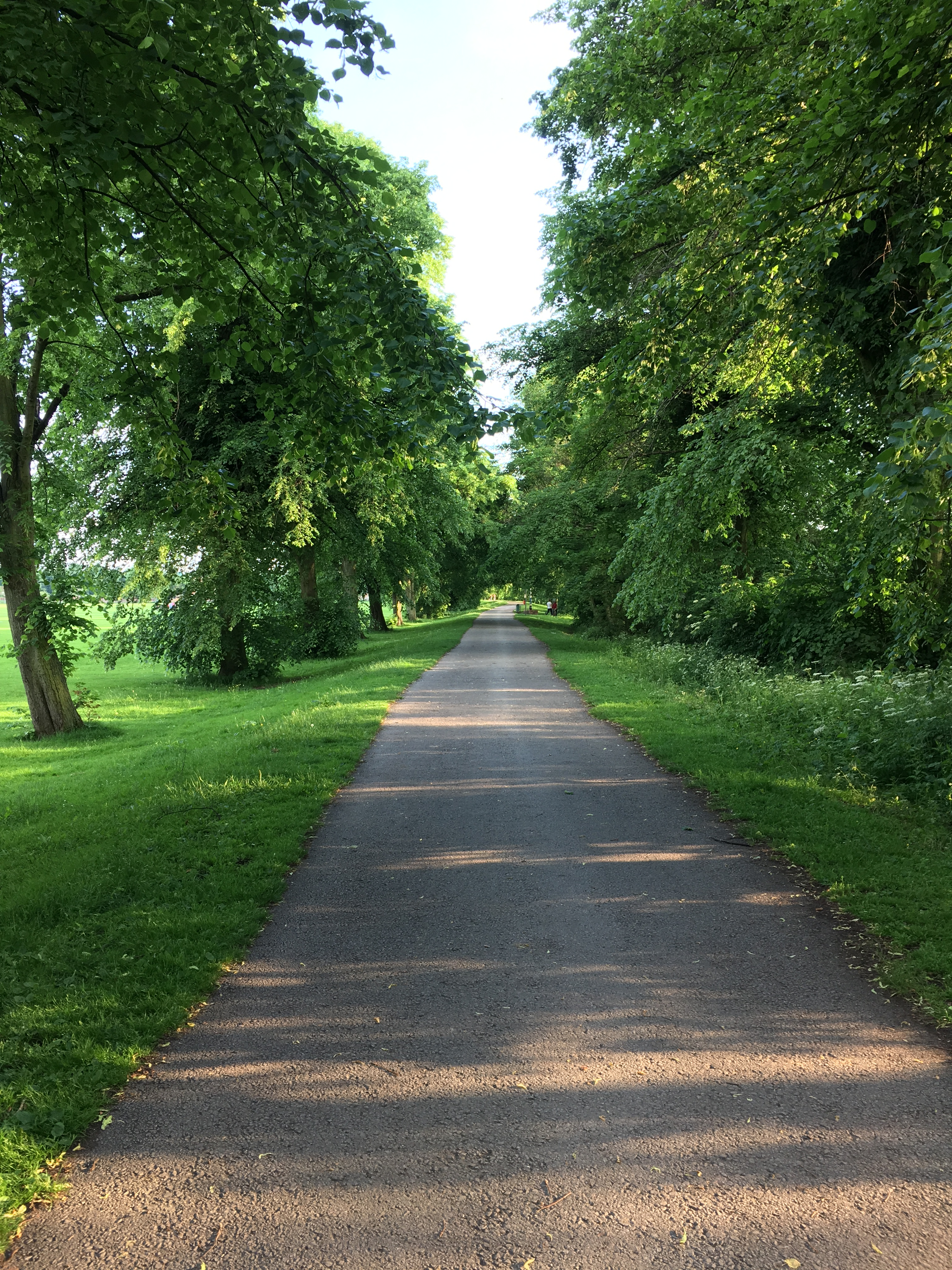
Darley Fields

== History ==
In 1929 the Evans family, who were the local mill owners, donated the site to the people of Derby. The park had its official opening by the Duke of Kent on 30 June 1931. Nearby Markeaton Park was also opened later that day. Thousands of people attended the opening, including around 4,000 local children.

Included in the grounds was a Georgian mansion which was demolished in the 1960s due to the building being unsafe. The site of the mansion was flattened and a paved garden was installed, in addition to the gardens that were already in place. Some of the bricks from the original mansion were used in the construction of the pillars that make up the tearooms outdoor seating area today.

== Gardens ==
Darley Park is home to largest collection of Hydrangeas in Britain, and the third largest in the world. First planted in 1984 it now has over 400 different types and is constantly expanding. Since April 2010 the collection has been maintained in partnership with a subgroup of Friends of Darley Open Spaces (FoDOS) called Hydrangea Derby.

The Hydrangea Derby project is helped by volunteers who plant, maintain and catalogue the collection. Open days are held each summer to showcase the collection and a free guided tour is provided. There is a butterfly garden situated next to the hydrangea collection.

== Events ==
The Darley Park Concert is held annually in the park and is hosted by Derby Live. The natural amphitheatre landscape allows spectators to view down to a temporary stage set up and there is a firework finale. The concert was previously Europe’s largest free outdoor concert, however as of 2018 there has been admission fees in place. The concert was temporarily moved to Castle Donington in 2017 due to council funding issues.

In 2012 the park hosted the end of day 42 in the 2012 Summer Olympics torch relay.

== Facilities ==
Darley Park Tearooms occupies the old school building that was once part of the mansion, and has a terraced area with views across the park and the city beyond. Darley Abbey Cricket Club has its ground and pavilion in the park. The club plays in the Derbyshire County Cricket League, Divisions 4 South, 7 South and 4 North. Derby Rowing Club is located at the south end of the park.
