= Alfred Angas Scott =

British motorcycle designer and inventor

- Born: 1875; Manningham, Bradford, United Kingdom
- Died: 1923 (aged 47–48)
- Resting place: Undercliffe Cemetery, Bradford
- Occupations: Motorcycle designer and manufacturer

Alfred Angas Scott (1875–1923) was a British motorcycle designer, inventor and founder of the Scott Motorcycle Company. A prolific inventor, he took out over 50 patents between 1897 and 1920, mostly concerning two-stroke engines and road vehicles. Scott was a keen potholer and the second president of the Gritstone club. In July 1923 Scott travelled back to Bradford in his open Scott Sociable wearing wet potholing clothes and contracted pneumonia, from which he died.

== Early life ==
Born in Manningham, a mill town just north of Bradford in 1875, Alfred Scott's family moved to Scotland and he went to school at Melrose on the Scottish border near Selkirk. They later moved to Uttoxeter in Staffordshire where Alfred studied engineering and design at Abbotsholme School. He was a gifted engineer and inventor and trained in engineering at shipbuilders Douglas & Grant in Kirkcaldy and worked at W. Sisson & Co Ltd in Gloucester, where he learnt to design and develop marine engines. Much of Scott's early experimental work was on the development of two-stroke marine engines which he would test by running them for long periods at full power on a water brake. He formed a syndicate of boating enthusiasts with his brothers Herbert and Norman Scott and two others to finance the development of marine engine for motor boats. This included the invention of a pawl and ratchet starter was used which later became part of a patent application for a kickstarter on almost all motorcycles to follow.

== Business ==
Alfred Scott's first motorcycle was developed from his own 2 horsepower (1.5 kW) twin-cylinder engine design which he hand built and fitted to the steering head of a bicycle. These engines were used to power equipment such as lathes and light machinery and Scott had been involved in the manufacture of 'Premier' pedal cycles. He developed this prototype into a motorcycle and six were produced under contract by friends with a car company called Jowett in Bradford. Scott patented an early form of caliper brakes in 1897 (Patent GB 1626 of 1897), designed a fully triangulated frame, rotary induction valves, and used unit construction for his motorcycle engine.

Scott started making boat engines in 1900. He patented his first engine in 1904 (Patent GB 3367 of 1904) and started motorcycle production in 1908 with a vertical two-stroke 450 cc twin. This had a patented triangulated frame, chain drive, neutral-finder, kick starter (Patent GB 27667 of 1908), and two-speed gearbox. His engine patent is the basis of all modern small-capacity two-stroke engines, and several other innovations such as the first kick starter, monoshock suspension, efficient radiators, rotary inlet valves, drip-feed lubricators and centrestands have remained in use to this day.

He formed The Scott Motorcycle Company in 1908. The motorcycles produced there were very successful in competitions, winning the fastest laps at the Isle of Man TT (Tourist Trophy race) from 1911 to 1914, with outright wins in 1912 and 1913. Scott's two-stroke motors were deemed to be "too efficient" for racing against four-stroke motorcycles of the same capacity, so their cubic capacity was multiplied by 1.32 for competitive purposes.

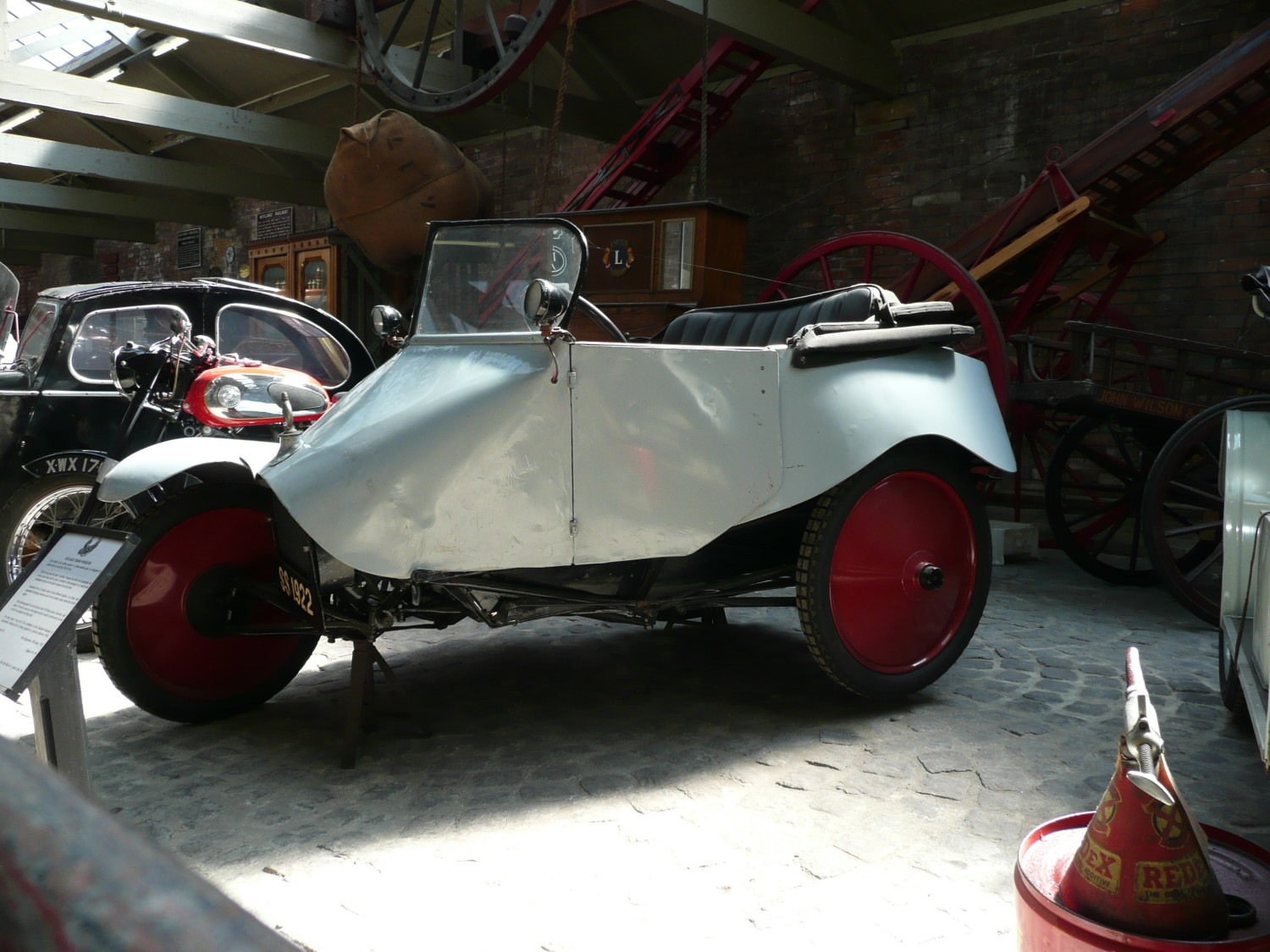
Scott Sociable on display at the Bradford Industrial Museum

Alfred Scott left the company in 1915 to form the Scott Autocar Company in nearby Bradford. By 1916 e had developed a hybrid between a motorcycle-and-sidecar combination and a compact car, which he called the Sociable. It was based on the machine gun carriers which the Scott Motorcycle Company were making at the time, but had its single front wheel moved to the offside in line with the driven rear wheel. The wooden bodywork was mounted on a tubular, triangular frame and the engine was Scott's own design, a 578 cc water-cooled, two-cylinder, two-stroke engine. The idea was not a success, production start had to wait until after the war, and ended in 1925.

== See also ==
- The Scott Motorcycle Company
- Scott Model 3S
