= Darley Abbey Cricket Club =

English cricket club based in Derby

- League: Derbyshire County Cricket League

Team information
- City: Darley Abbey, Derby
- Home ground: Riverside Meadow, Darley Park
- Official website: Official website

Darley Abbey Cricket Club is an English cricket club based in Darley Abbey, Derby. The club plays its home matches at Riverside Meadow in Darley Park and fields teams in the Derbyshire County Cricket League.

== Ground ==
The club's home ground is Riverside Meadow, situated in Darley Park near the River Derwent. Derby City Council identifies Riverside Meadow as the home of Darley Abbey Cricket Club and includes it within a group of outdoor sporting facilities north of Derby city centre.

A council assessment of cricket facilities recorded the ground as having nine grass strips, an artificial strip and practice nets.

== Teams and community cricket ==
Darley Abbey participates in the Derbyshire County Cricket League. The club is also listed by the England and Wales Cricket Board as one of its Disability Cricket Champion Clubs in Derbyshire.

== Notable matches ==
On 24 August 2024, Darley Abbey's fourth XI played Mickleover's third XI in a Division Nine South match. Mickleover declared on 271 for four, after which Darley Abbey finished on 21 for four and secured a draw.

Darley Abbey opener Ian Bestwick batted through the innings, facing 137 deliveries without scoring a run. Thomas Bestwick faced 71 deliveries and scored four runs. The innings received coverage from the BBC and several international news organisations.

== See also ==
- Darley Abbey
- Darley Park
- Derbyshire County Cricket Club
