= Scott Sociable =

Historical English automobile

The Scott Sociable was an English automobile manufactured from 1921 to 1925 by the Scott Autocar Company of Bradford, Yorkshire, an offshoot of the Scott Motorcycle Company.

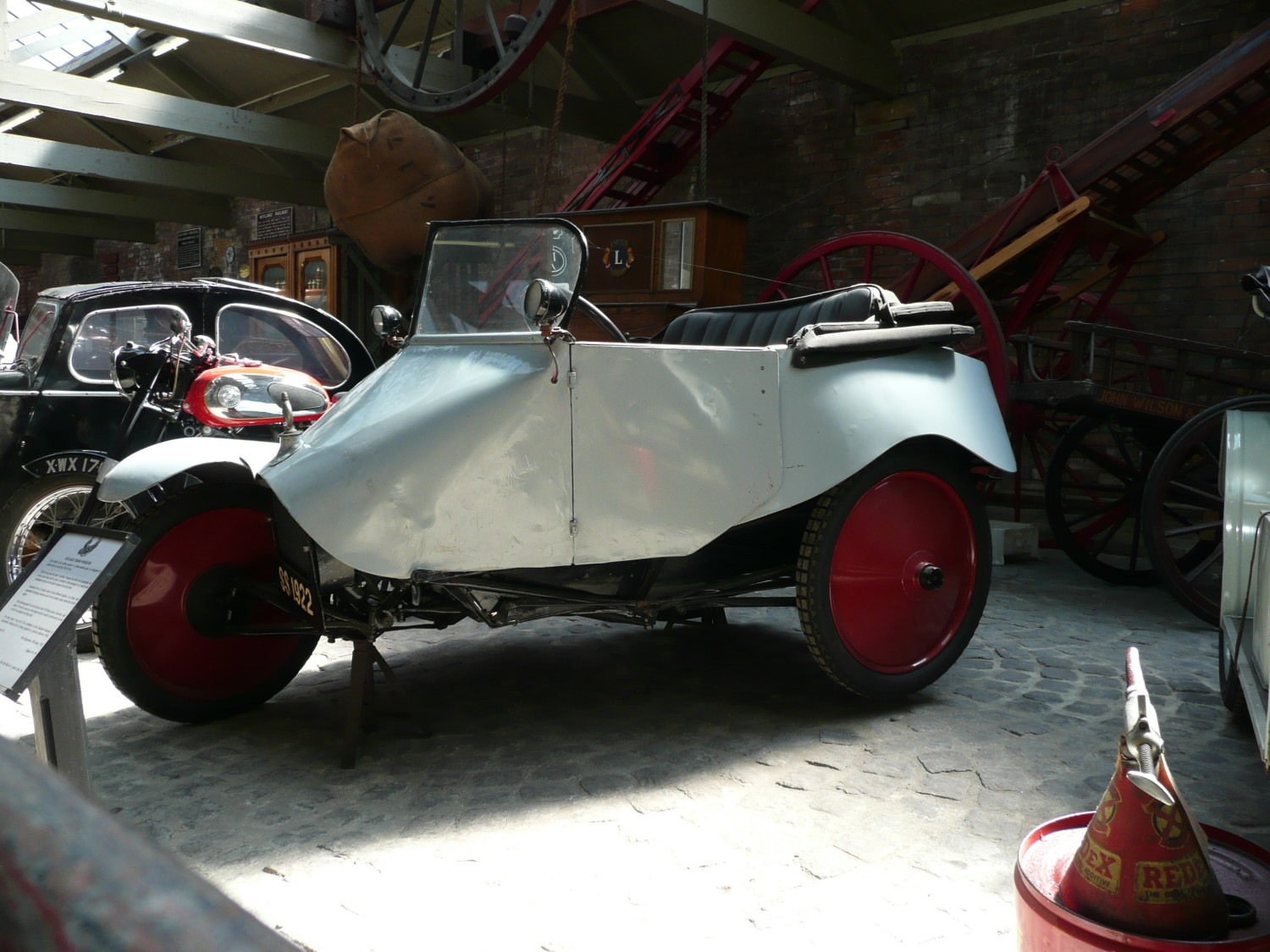
Scott Sociable on display at the Bradford Industrial Museum

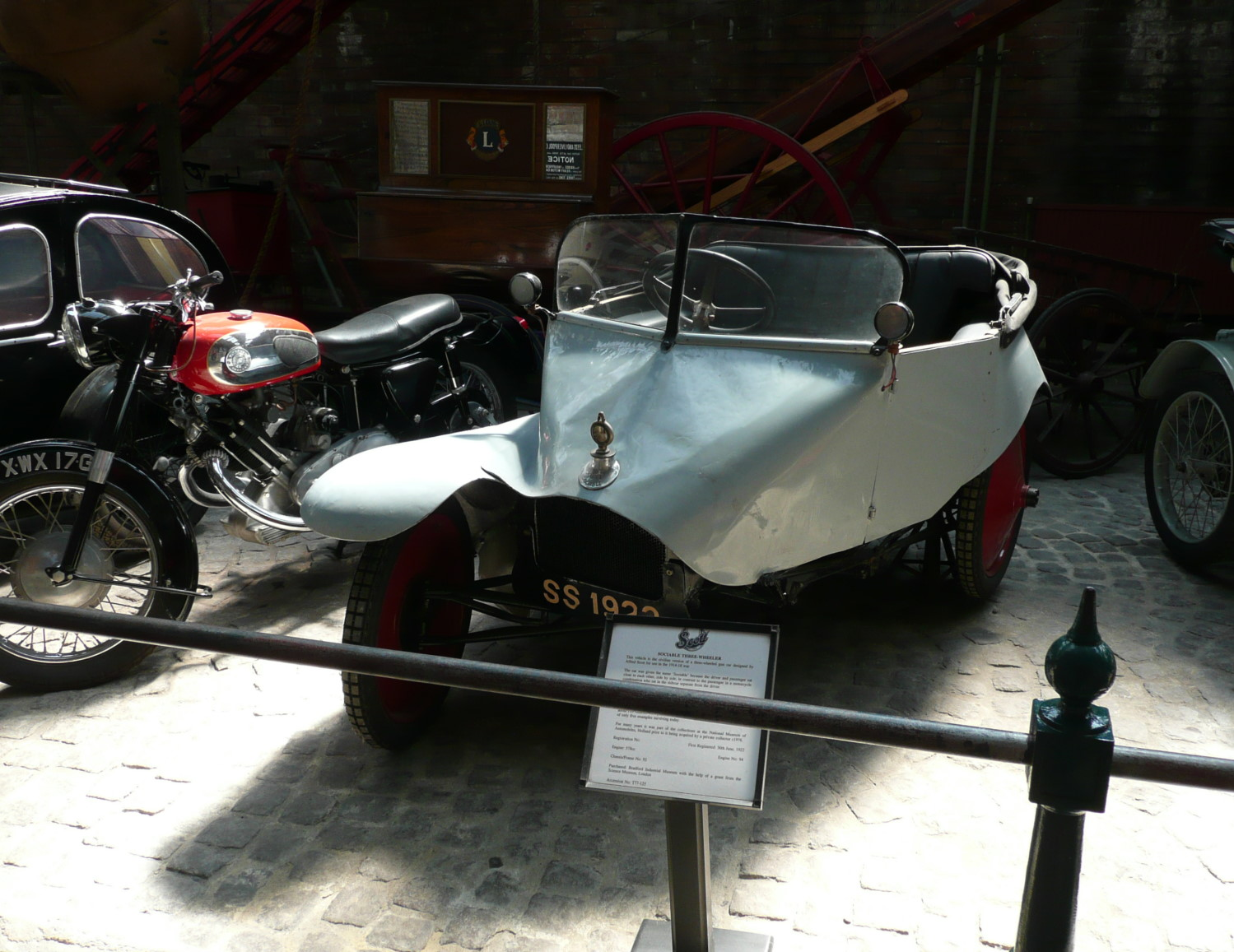
Scott Sociable

During World War I Alfred Angas Scott had made sidecar machine gun carriers. From these he developed a three-wheel car with two wheels in line and a third one set alongside the other rear wheel, all supported by a triangulated tubular steel frame. The layout was mostly derived from a motorcycle-and-sidecar combination, but wheel steering was accomplished by rack and pinion. It used a water-cooled 578 cc twin-cylinder two-stroke engine supplied by the Scott Motorcycle Company. Power was transmitted through a three-speed gearbox to the offside rear wheel by shaft. There was no reverse gear.

Braking could be dangerous at speed, as the two rear brakes were operated individually: the drive wheel by a hand lever, the balance wheel by a foot pedal.

The vehicle was intended for military use, but orders failed to come, so Scott converted it to civilian use and announced it in 1916 as the Sociable. Because of wartime restrictions, production had to wait until 1921. About 200 were made before production stopped in 1924. Complete cars cost £273 in 1921, falling to £135 by 1924.

== See also ==
- List of car manufacturers of the United Kingdom
- List of motorcycles of the 1920s
- List of motorized trikes
