= Listed buildings in Darley Abbey =

Darley Abbey is a former village, and later a suburb, to the north of the city of Derby, England. It contains 25 listed buildings that are recorded in the National Heritage List for England. Of these, one is listed at Grade I, the highest of the three grades, four are at Grade II*, the middle grade, and the others are at Grade II, the lowest grade. The village contained an abbey, but little of it remains, apart from the building converted for use as the Abbey Inn. Industry came to the village in the 15th century, and this was further developed from 1782 by the Evans family, who built mills, and housing and community facilities for their workers. The mills, later used for other purposes, and many of the workers' houses are listed, together with a church and other community facilities.

== Key ==
| Grade | Criteria |
|---|---|
| I | Buildings of exceptional interest, sometimes considered to be internationally important |
| II* | Particularly important buildings of more than special interest |
| II | Buildings of national importance and special interest |

== Buildings ==
| Name and location | Photograph | Date | Notes | Grade |
|---|---|---|---|---|
| Old Abbey Building; 52.94198°N 1.47678°W | | 15th century | The only significant remaining standing part of Darley Abbey, it is in stone with buttresses, and a tile roof. There are two storeys and four bays. In the ground floor are two doorways, one with a pointed head, and the other with a flat head. The upper floor contains three mullioned and transomed windows with cusped heads. On the gable end are external steps leading to a round-arched doorway with a hood mould, and a two-light mullioned window above. | II* |
| Stables and service wing, former Darley Hall; 52.94103°N 1.47860°W | — | Early 18th century | The stable block and separate service wing are in brick on a stone plinth and have slate roofs. The stables have two storeys and an L-shaped plan, with ranges of six and three bays. In the west range is a full-height semicircular-headed carriage entrance, and segmental-headed doorway and windows. In the south range are three carriage doors under a continuous lintel. The service wing has a single storey and five bays, and contains flat-headed openings. | II |
| Works adjacent to 11 and 12 Darley Street; 52.94218°N 1.47649°W | — | Early 18th century | The building is in brick, painted on the front, with a corrugated sheet roof. There are three storeys and five bays. On the front are irregular openings, including a loading door, and at the rear are cast iron casement windows. | II |
| 5–10 Darley Street; 52.94221°N 1.47673°W | | Late 18th century | A row of houses in red brick, mainly stuccoed, with modillion eaves and slate roofs. They are of differing heights, in two and three storeys. One doorway has a gabled hood, and another has a hood on consoles. The windows are a mix of sashes and casements, and some have segmental-arched heads. | II |
| 1–4 Old Lane and separate house 52.94332°N 1.47349°W | — | Late 18th century | The buildings in the grounds of Darley Abbey Mill are in brick. Nos. 1–3 form a terrace at the entrance to the site. They have two storeys, No. 1 is in painted brick, and has a doorway with a segmental head, and sash windows, and Nos. 2 and 3 are stuccoed, the doorway has a flat head, and the windows are replacements. No. 4 is separate, and has a square plan, and sash windows with brick lintels. The house is also separate, and has three storeys, three bays, a concave front and a convex rear. | II |
| Darley Abbey Weir; 52.94301°N 1.47581°W | | c. 1782 | The weir in the River Derwent, to the west of Daley Abbey Mills, is built in gritstone blocks. It is in two parts to the north and south of a natural island. The north part consists of a curved weir about 20 metres (66 ft) long with a stepped spillway, and a wall containing two floodgates that are connected to the island. To the south is a weir and a fish weir about 25 metres (82 ft) long. | II |
| 1–12 Flat Square; 52.94267°N 1.47670°W | | 1792 | Two terraces of houses for mill workers facing each other across a square. They are in red brick, partly stuccoed, with a dentilled eaves course and slate roofs, hipped at the east ends. There are three storeys, and each range has six bays. The windows vary and include sashes and casements, some with cambered heads. | II |
| 1–8 West Row and privies 52.94265°N 1.47691°W | | 1792 | A terrace of houses for mill workers in painted rendered brick, with a dentilled eaves course, and hipped slate roofs. Some doorways have cambered heads, and the windows are a mix of sashes and casements, some with cambered heads. Opposite and on the other side of the road is a row of six brick privies. | II |
| South Complex, Darley Abbey Mills; 52.94341°N 1.47476°W | | c. 1792 | A complex of mill buildings in red brick and gritstone with slate roofs that have been altered and extended. The mills are Long Mill, Middle Mill, East Mill and West Mill, which are linked. The ancillary buildings associated with them are an engine house and chimney, a toll-house, a bobbin shop and a drying shed. The mills were originally water-powered, and later were steam driven. | I |
| Preparation Building, cottage, workshop and cart sheds, Darley Abbey Mills; 52.94435°N 1.47509°W | | c. 1795 | A range of buildings in red brick with a slate roof, two storeys and seven bays. They have an L-shaped plan, consisting of the Preparation Building, a cottage and a workshop, in one range, and a three-bay range to the south converted into cart sheds. On the south front are large arched openings and a brick-built external staircase, and above are windows arranged irregularly. | II* |
| 5–27 Mile Ash Lane; 52.94214°N 1.48238°W | | 1795–96 | A slightly curving terrace of twelve houses for mill workers stepped up a hill. They are in brick, some are stuccoed, and they have a dentilled eaves course and slate roofs. There are three storeys, each house has a single bay, and each pair of houses are mirror images. The doorways have segmental brick arches, and the windows are casements, those in the lower two floors with segmental brick arches. | II |
| 3–16 Brick Row; 52.94271°N 1.47880°W | | 1797–1800 | A terrace of 14 houses for mill workers in red brick, No. 16 stuccoed, with slate roofs. There are three storeys, each house has a single bay, and there is a single-storey extension at the right end. The doorways and windows in the lower two floors have segmental brick-arched lintels. Most of the doors and windows have been altered, and at the rear is a row of privies. | II* |
| 1–14 Lavender Row; 52.94256°N 1.48229°W | | Late 18th to early 19th century | A terrace of 14 houses for mill workers stepped up a slope. They are in red brick with stone dressings, partly with engraved stucco, and have dog-tooth eaves and slate roofs. There are three storeys and each house has a single bay. The doorways and windows, which are a mix of sashes and casements, have wedge lintels and keystones. | II |
| The Hollies; 52.94186°N 1.47893°W | — | 1803–06 | A brick house with a hipped slate roof, two storeys, and an L-shaped plan with a main block and service wings. The main front is at right angles to the road, overlooking the garden, and contains a central doorway with a canopy, and sliding sash windows. | II |
| St Matthew's Church; 52.94478°N 1.47939°W | | 1818–19 | The chancel, chapel and organ chamber were added in 1885–86. The church, designed by Henry Moses Wood, is built in stone with a slate roof. It consists of a nave, a chancel with a chapel and organ chamber, and a west tower. The tower has three stages, clock faces, an embattled parapet and corner pinnacles, and along the body of the church are embattled parapets and pinnacles. | II |
| Fire Station and building to the east, Darley Abbey Mills; 52.94419°N 1.47513°W | | c. 1820 | The former fire station and the building to its east are in brick with slate roofs. Both buildings have a single storey, and both originated with four bays, and have been extended. | II |
| 1–5 Poplar Row; 52.94159°N 1.47686°W | | 1823 | A terrace of five houses for mill workers in red brick with dentilled eaves and a slate roof. There are three storeys and each house has a single bay. The doorways and the windows in the lower two floors (the windows are casements) have segmental brick-arched heads. | II |
| North Mill, engine house and boiler house, Darley Abbey Mills; 52.94392°N 1.47469°W | | c. 1825 | The buildings are in red brick on a gritstone base with slate roofs. The mill has three storeys and an attic, and an L-shaped plan with fronts of 13 and six bays, a single-bay projection at the north end, and a loading bay and single-storey linking block at the west end. The engine house and boiler house were added in the late 19th century at the east end, both with a single storey, the engine house with three bays and the boiler house with four. | II* |
| Sawmill and workshop range, and drying shed, Darley Abbey Mills; 52.94314°N 1.47375°W | — | Early 19th century | A pair of detached buildings in gritstone with slate roofs, and in brick with modern cladding. The sawmill and workshop range has two storeys, a seven-bay section with multi-pane cast iron casement windows, and a taller five-bay section with a hipped roof, containing wide openings, a loading door and windows, and with external stone stairs. The drying shed has a single storey and an L-shaped plan, with ranges of five bays. | II |
| The White House; 52.94185°N 1.47877°W | — | Early 19th century | The house is in stuccoed brick, with corner pilasters and a hipped slate roof. There are two storeys and a semi-basement, and the house consists of a main block and service wings. The windows are sashes. | II |
| 1 and 2 Brick Row; 52.94230°N 1.47921°W | | 1826 | Built as a schoolroom and later used for other purposes, it is in red brick with stone dressings on a plinth, with a sill band, a cornice, and a slate roof. There are two storeys and nine bays, the outer bays projecting. Over the outer bays and in the centre are pediments, the central pediment containing a clock face. In the ground floor are two doorways and windows, all with round-arched heads and set in recesses, and the upper floor contains sash windows. | II* |
| 3–9 New Road; 52.94178°N 1.47832°W | | By 1826 | Two blocks with four houses in each block, in brick, with stuccoed fronts and hipped slate roofs. The blocks have two storeys and six bays each, between the blocks are single-storey links, to the right is a single-storey extension, and on the left is a lean-to. Each block has two doorways in round-arched recesses, above each door is a blind window, and the other windows are a mix of sashes and casements. | II |
| 1 and 2 Abbey Yard; 52.94118°N 1.47845°W | — | Early to mid 19th century | A pair of cottages in brick with a slate roof. There are two storeys and two bays. The doorways and windows have shallow brick arches. | II |
| Dean's Field; 52.94147°N 1.47563°W | — | Early to mid 19th century | Originally the mill manager's house, later used for other purposes, it is in painted brick with a hipped slate roof. There are two storeys, one sliding sash window remains, and the other windows are replacements. | II |
| 3–5 Abbey Yard; 52.94126°N 1.47881°W | — | Late 1830s | A terrace of three houses in red brick with a roof of blue Staffordshire tiles. There are two storeys and rear extensions. The doorways and the windows, which are casements, have segmental heads. At the rear are three, free-standing, single-storey, brick outbuildings. | II |
