= Flying squirrel typhus =

Bacterial disease

- Specialty: Infectious diseases

Flying squirrel typhus is a condition characterized by a rash of early macules, and, later, maculopapules.

The flying squirrel Glaucomys volans can transmit epidemic typhus.

Apart from humans, flying squirrels are the only currently known reservoir for Rickettsia prowazekii.

== See also ==
- Brill–Zinsser disease
- List of cutaneous conditions
