= St Helen's Priory, Derby =

Monastery in Derby, England

- Location within Derbyshire
- Interactive map of St Helen's Priory, Derby

Monastery information
- Full name: The Priory of St Helen, Derby
- Other name: Derby Augustinian Priory
- Order: Augustinian Canons
- Established: 1137
- Disestablished: Before 1360
- Mother house: Darley Abbey (from 1154)
- Dedication: St Helen
- Controlled churches: St Peter's Church, Derby (until 1154)

People
- Founders: Towyne, a Burgess of Derby

Site
- Location: Derby, United Kingdom
- Coordinates: 52.927061°N 1.481212°W
- Visible remains: None

St Helen's Priory, also known as Derby Augustinian Priory, was a small Augustinian priory, and later hospital, in Derby, England.

== Priory and hospital ==
St Helen's Priory was founded in 1137 by a man named Towyne, who was a Burgess of Derby. The priory was constructed to the North-West of the town of Derby, just outside the town walls. Dedicated to St Helen, the priory is described as being "an oratory or small religious house".

The Priory was endowed by Hugh, Dean of Derby, with lands at "Little-Derley", and was given control of St Peter's Church, Derby. This land at "Little-Derley", around a mile from the priory, was used for the establishment of Darley Abbey, and, in 1154, many of the canons transferred from St Helen's to Darley; St Helen's thus becoming a cell to Darley Abbey.

Shortly after, in 1160, the priory began to operate as a hospital.

When assessed for tax in 1291, St Helen's is recorded as having a total annual income of £4 17s. 8d., the vast majority of which coming from the priory/hospital's 120 acres of arable land.

The hospital is thought to have ceased operating around 1350.

== Later history and remains ==
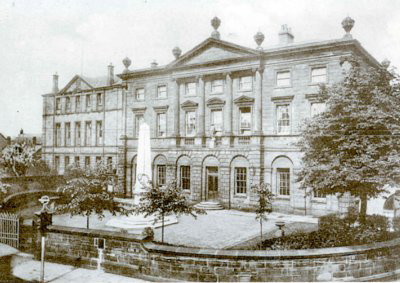
St Helen's House c.1920, when it was Derby School.

The priory was located in the area currently known as St. Helen's Street, however, nothing remains of the priory buildings.

After the dissolution of Darley Abbey, the Abbey's land, including that of the previous St Helen's Priory, was surrendered to the crown.
In 1554 Queen Mary I (Bloody Mary), issued a Royal Charter granting several of Darley Abbey's properties and endowments to the Corporation of Derby for the establishment of: ""a Free Grammar School, for the instruction and education of boys and youths in the said town of Derby for ever to be maintained by the Bailiffs and Burgesses of the same town". This school was Derby School.

Between 1766 and 1767, St Helen's House (which takes its name from the priory), was constructed on land formerly owned by the priory. First a private house, from 1861 it was home to Derby School.

Around 1817 human remains, attributed to the priory and hospital, were found at the former priory site.
Also at this time, part of the site was occupied by a Marble Factory, owned by a "Mr Brown".

== See also ==
- Darley Abbey
- Derby School
- St Helen's House
