= Scott Model 3S =

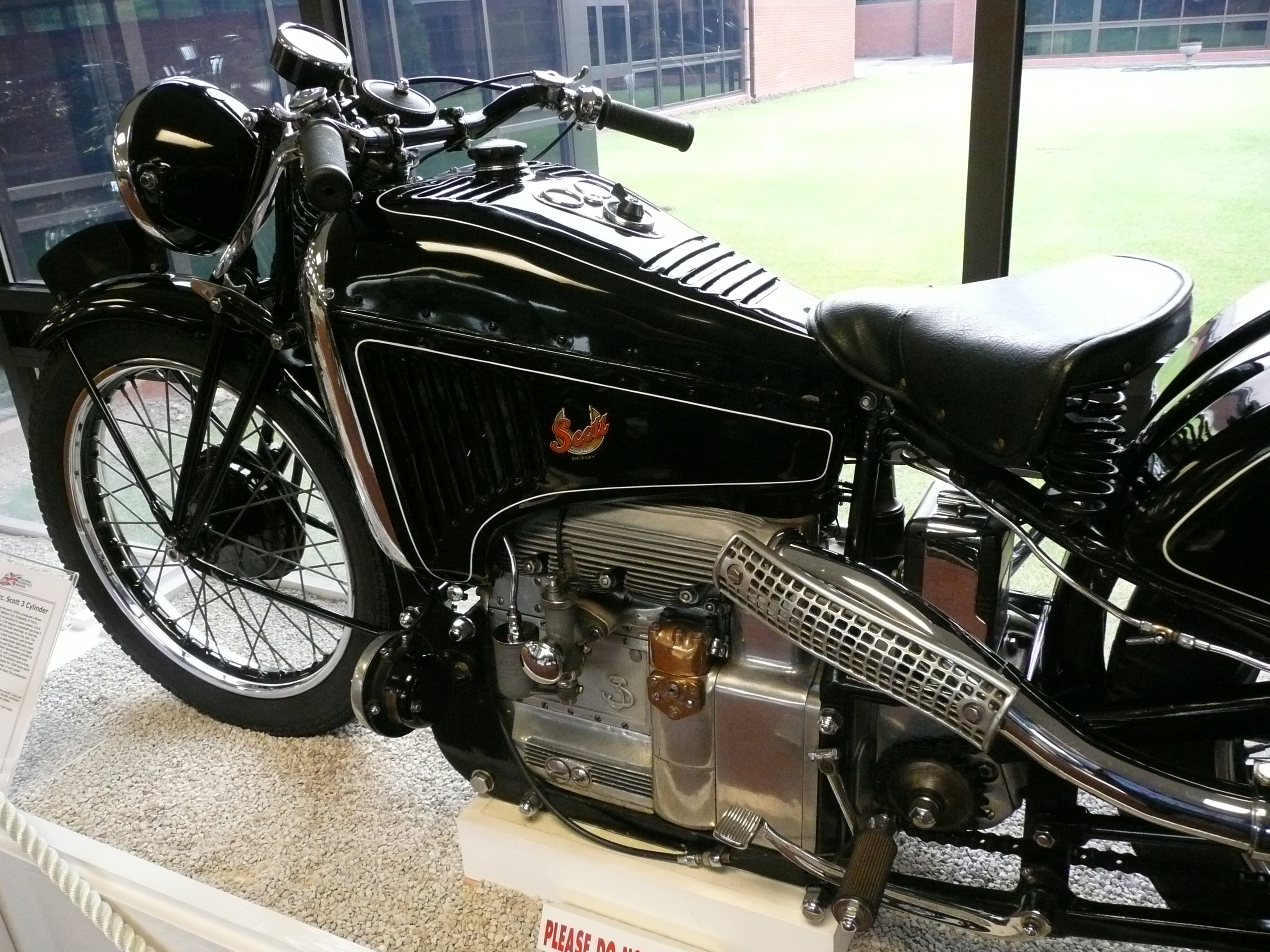
- Manufacturer: (United Kingdom) The Scott Motorcycle Company
- Production: 1938–1939
- Engine: 986 cc three-cylinder two-stroke
- Suspension: Webb girder front forks and DMW rear swinging arm
- Brakes: 8 in drums
- Tires: 3.25 x 20 front and rear
- Wheelbase: 60.5 inches (154 cm)
- Weight: 490 pounds (220 kg) (dry)

The Scott Model 3S was a British motorcycle made by The Scott Motorcycle Company in 1938. Only eight were produced before the outbreak of World War II.

== Development ==
The Scott designer William Cull had been experimenting with three-cylinder two-strokes throughout the 1930s and had developed a prototype 747 cc engine. The Scott Model 3S which was unveiled at the 1934 Olympia Motorcycle Show was a further development of this work, with the capacity enlarged to 986 cc and a four-speed gearchange. A notable feature of the Model 3S was the lubrication system, which had a throttle-operated pump drawing oil from the sump and delivering it to a geared pump, while a separate geared pump dealt with the return. Another unusual feature was that fuel was held in 'pannier' containers each side of the rear wheel so the apparent fuel tank was actually a dummy housing the instrumentation and control box (a feature later copied by the Honda Gold Wing). Only eight were produced before the outbreak of World War II. The final Model 3S is on display at the National Motorcycle Museum (UK).

== See also ==
- List of motorcycles of the 1930s
