= The Scott Motorcycle Company =

British motorcycle manufacturer

Scott Motorcycle Company
- Founded: 1908
- Defunct: 1978
- Fate: Voluntary liquidation
- Headquarters: Saltaire, West Yorkshire, England
- Key people: Alfred Angas Scott
- Products: Motorcycles

The Scott Motorcycle Company was owned by Scott Motors (Saltaire) Limited, Saltaire, West Yorkshire, England and was a well-known producer of motorcycles and light engines for industry. Founded by Alfred Angas Scott in 1908 as the Scott Engineering Company in Bradford, Yorkshire, Scott motorcycles were produced until 1978.

Initially started in a rented workshop, Alfred moved the business to Hirstwood Works, Hirstwood Road, Saltaire. This building is still used industrially.

== Development ==
=== Scott's inspiration ===
In an article in Motor Cycle magazine in 1914, Alfred Scott wrote that he was drawn to the two-stroke engine because he was trained on high speed steam and marine engines, and when turning his attention to gas and petrol engines the regular power strokes of the two-stroke (or Day cycle as he sometimes called it), seemed preferable to the one power stroke in four of the Otto cycle. He said this attraction to the two stroke was further enhanced by the reliable and excellent service from a two stroke engine designed by his brother (A. F. Scott M.I.M.E) and used to drive machinery in his experimental workshop.

=== Experiments ===
Scott's first experiments with a two-stroke were in a motor boat, where he was able to make tests and obtain 'diagrams' under working conditions. His first attempt at a motor cycle was fitting an engine of his own design to a Premier bicycle in 1901. This twin cylinder engine had steel cylinders with shrunk-on aluminium radiator 'flanges', and drove the front wheel via friction directly to the tyre. He described the drive system as 'useless in the wet', and he could not prevent the cylinders from scoring. His next engine had cast iron cylinders of 2 1/4" bore, and eventually drove by belt to clutch countershaft and then by chain to the rear wheel. Various ingenious ignition arrangements were used including link work driven by a pin placed mid-way on the connecting rod. In parallel to this he continued work on a 4" bore, 4" stroke marine engine which developed 10HP at 800rpm, fitted with a large water-cooled brake wheel (a dynamometer). By recording brake and indicator readings he was able to experiment with port shapes and piston shapes, developing the 'curved top' (deflector) piston.

=== 1908 motorcycle ===
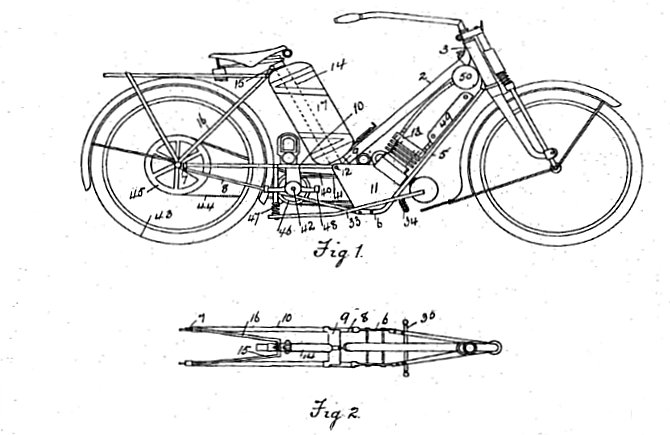
1908 Scott Motorcycle from patent GB190816564 cc

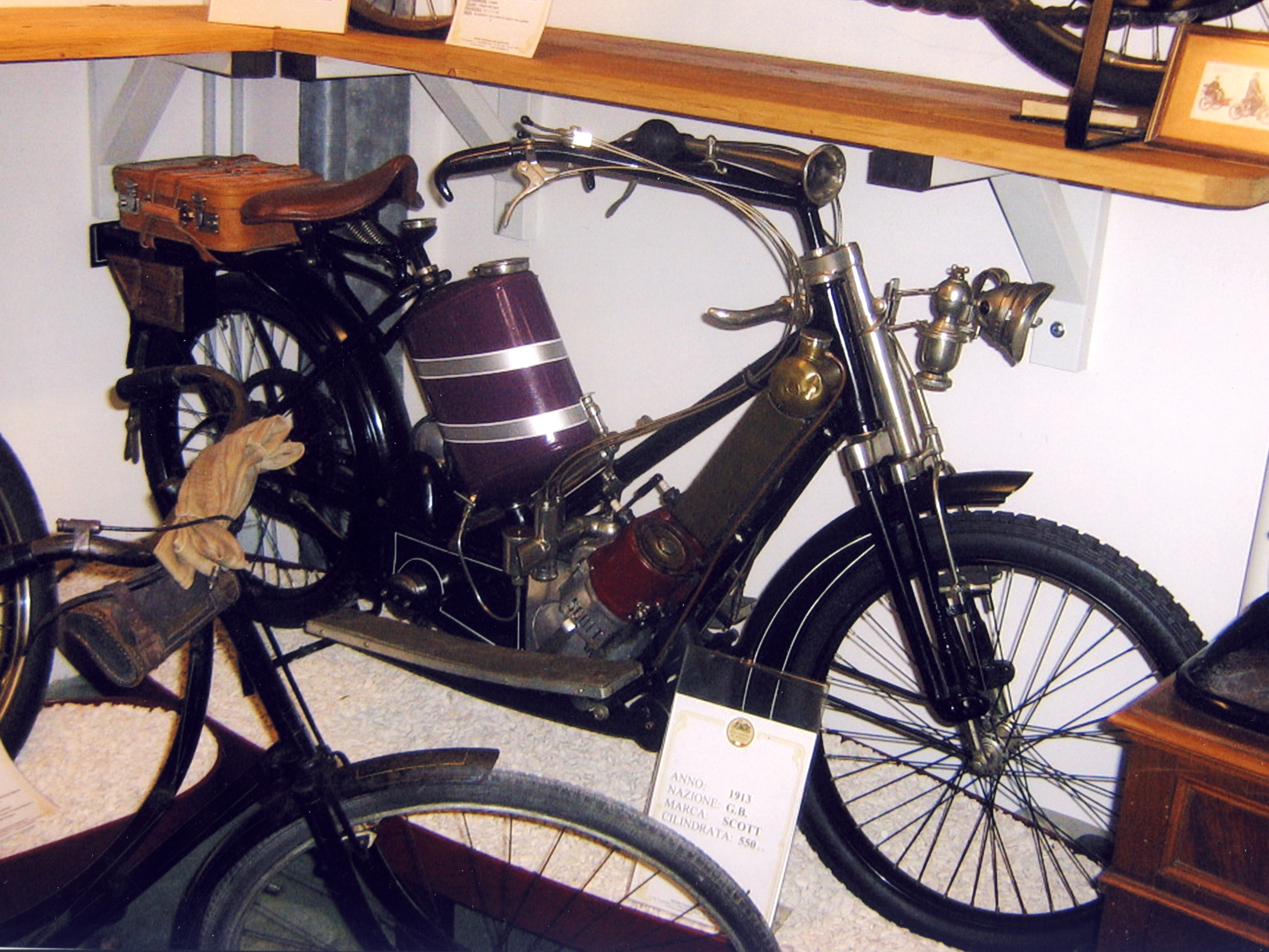
1913 Scott 550 cc

Scott designed and patented a vertical twin two-stroke engine in 1904, and patented the familiar Scott motorcycle frame in 1908 designed to accept an engine of the type in the former patent and to achieve a low centre of gravity. The resulting motorcycle was launched in 1908 featuring a 450 cc two-stroke twin-cylinder water-cooled engine. Innovative features included a patented two-speed chain transmission in which the alternative ratios were selected by clutches operated by a rocking foot pedal and a kick start also patented. The first few machines to his design were produced by Bradford-based car firm Jowett in 1908 and soon after he set up as a manufacturer in his own right at the Mornington Works, Grosvenor Road, Bradford.

== Pre-war competition success ==
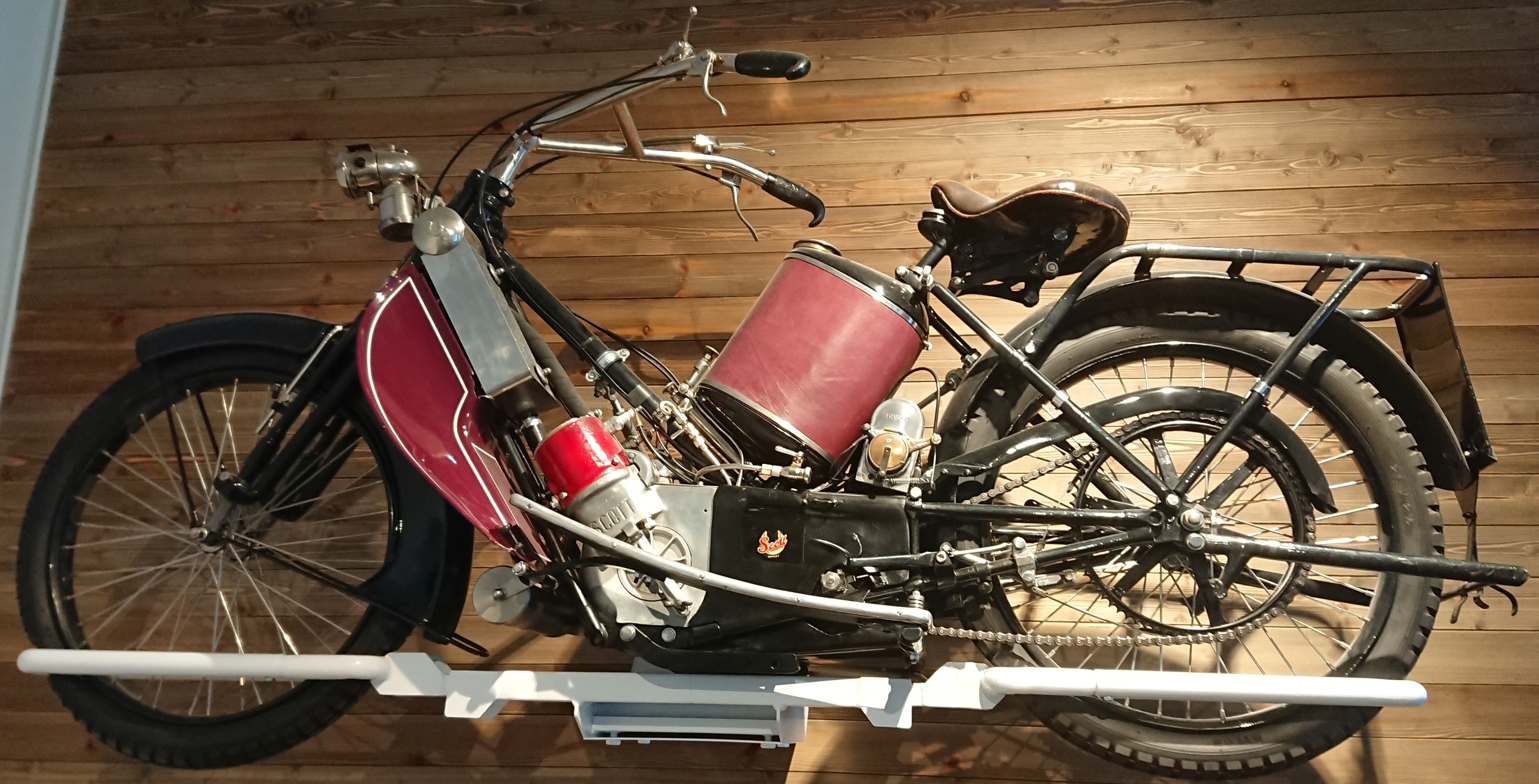
1913 Scott 532cc

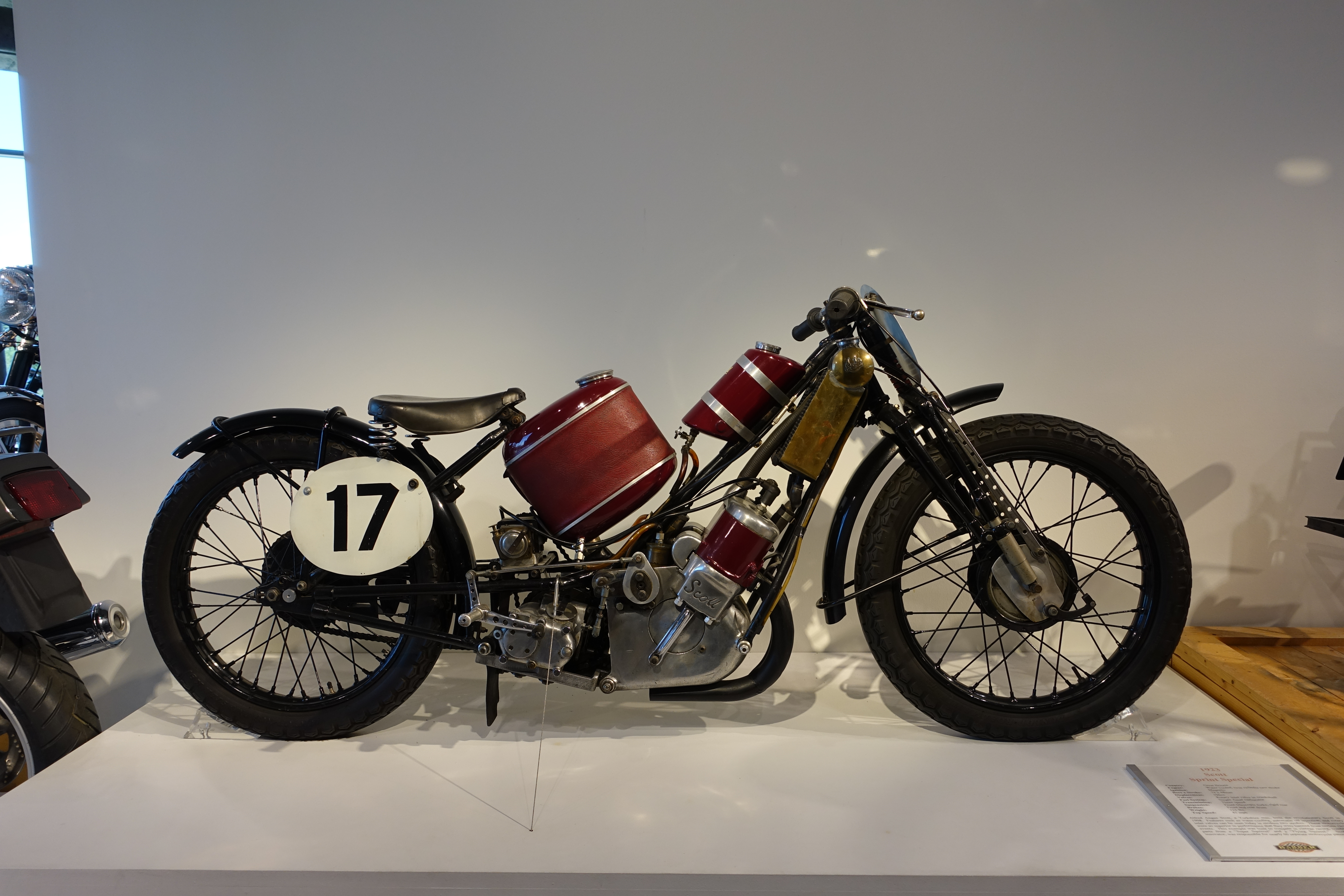
1923 Scott Sprint Special on display at the Barber Vintage Motorsports Museum, Birmingham, Alabama. The twin-cylinder motorcycle had a displacement of 596cc, weighed 335 pounds, and had a top speed of 85 mph.

While Scott's production machines were marketed as a kind of luxury "wheeled horse" for the Edwardian Gentleman, there was valuable publicity to be had in competition success and the early Scott motorcycles were so powerful that they often easily beat four-stroke motorcycles of the same capacity. After Scott's victory at the 1908 Wass Bank hillclimb, the Auto-Cycle Union handicapped their motorcycles by multiplying their cubic capacity by 1.32 for competitive purposes, which resulted in good, free advertising for Scott. The handicap was lifted three years later.

Scott made several appearances at the Isle of Man TT Races between 1910 and 1914 with specially built racing machines. In 1910 a Scott was the first two-stroke motorcycle ever to complete a full TT course under race conditions and in 1911 a Scott ridden by Frank Phillip gained the TT lap record of 50.11 mph (80.64 km/h) continuous average speed. This winning streak continued with Scotts being the fastest machines in 1912, 1913, and 1914 and winning the event in 1912 and 1913.

From 1911 to 1914 Scott's Tourist Trophy racers used rotary valves to control the inlet and transfer phases of the two-stroke cycle. In 1911 the engine was controlled by advancing or retarding the valve timing and not by the throttle. Scott reverted to throttle control in 1912, giving the rotary valves a fixed gear drive in the same year.

== First World War ==
Three months after the outbreak of the First World War in 1914, Scott announced they had received a large government contract and the launch of their 1915 models would be delayed. This marked the end of production of civilian Scott motorcycles for the duration of the war. Despatch riders volunteering for war service were allowed to use their own motorcycles, and there are pictures of Scotts in such use, but the army requirement in 1914 was for single cylinder 3.5HP models, or opposed twins. Further rationalisation was needed for the Expeditionary Force due to managing spares, and Scott was not on the list, however they were engaged to produce motorcycle (and sidecar) based mobile machine gun batteries with 18 machines being sent to the front for testing at the end of 1914.

Scott Mobile Machine Gun

The machine gun units each comprised 3 Scott 552cc machines, one with the gun (the Vickers when deployed late in 1914), one carrying ammunition, and one as a spare. Enfield were also commissioned to produce their own version of this mobile machine gun platform powered by the 770cc JAP V-twin engine.

Alfred Scott also developed a three-wheeled machine gun carriage which was not taken up by the military and in 1919 he left the company he had founded to develop the vehicle for civilian use as the Scott Sociable. This did not prove to be as successful as the Scott motorcycle but Scott never returned to the Scott Motorcycle Company.

== The Scott Squirrel ==
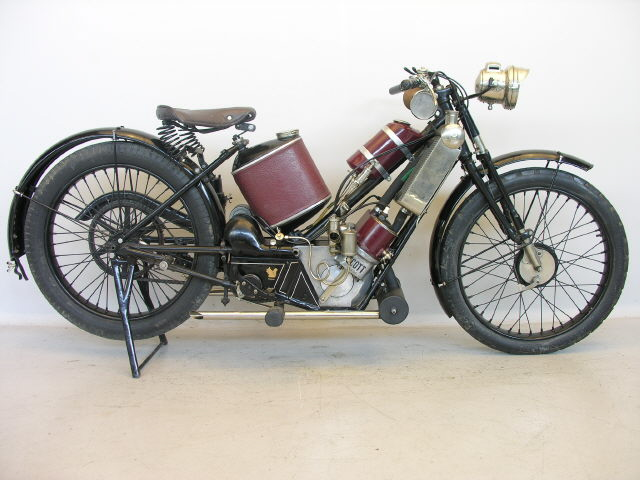
1923 Scott Squirrel 486 cc

After the war production restarted with the 532 cc Standard Tourer, and in 1922 Scott introduced the Squirrel, its first sporting model to be offered to the general public. This had a slightly smaller 486 cc engine to bring it within the 500 cc competition limit but, with aluminium pistons and careful preparation, it produced more power. In addition, many heavy accessories such as foot boards and leg shields which had been fitted to the touring models were dispensed with, making it a very light and competitive motorcycle. It was followed by the Super Squirrel, with a further revised engine of 498 cc or 596 cc, which was the mainstay of production in the mid-1920s, and the Flying Squirrel. Although they never regained their pre-war form, Scotts continued to compete successfully in sporting events scoring a 3–4 in the 1922 TT and a third in 1924. A three-speed gearbox with conventional clutch was offered from 1923 and in this form the machine had some success as a trials motorcycle.

== Second World War ==
In 1935 the Scott three cylinder motorcycle was launched as a water-cooled 750 cc in-line machine. This was superseded by the 1000 cc version and proved to be another example of innovative engineering by the Scott company. Neither made it into quantity production, due to the outbreak of the Second World War and the failing business finances.

== The Flying Squirrel ==
Shortly after the end of the Second World War (1946/7) Scott relaunched the Scott Flying Squirrel. Available with 500 or 600 cc engines, these were even heavier than the pre-war versions and expensive for the performance offered. Sales were disappointing.

== Birmingham Scotts ==
In 1950 the company went into liquidation and was acquired by Scott enthusiast Matt Holder's Aerco Jig and Tool Company in Birmingham. From his premises in St Mary's Row, Holder, who was an expert silversmith, initially continued to build the same model from Shipley-made spare parts. These "Birmingham Scotts" remained available into the 1960s. In 1956 Holder began development of a 596 cc model with a duplex frame and telescopic fork front. When Matt's son David Holder moved the remaining stock to the former Triumph Motorcycles 'Number 2' factory at Meriden he found that his father had accumulated a huge collection of original Scott parts, including Miller headlights and Burgess silencers. In 1958 the Birmingham Scott was updated by adding a swinging arm frame and the dynamo was replaced by an alternator. A new 493 cc motorcycle called the Scott Swift was announced but never went into production, although Holder continued to develop and produce one-off Scott motorcycles until 1978.

== The Bulmer workshop ==
Fabricator Brian Bulmer teamed up with two-stroke engine tuner Brian Wolley and rider Barrie Scully to develop a racing version of the Birmingham Scott air-cooled 350 cc twin, setting a record for the Barbon Hillclimb and achieving 115.4 mph (185.7 km/h) in a Motor Cycling test. The team also developed a 52 bhp water-cooled 500 cc version, but competition from Japanese two-strokes meant that the project was not fully developed.

== Silk Scotts ==
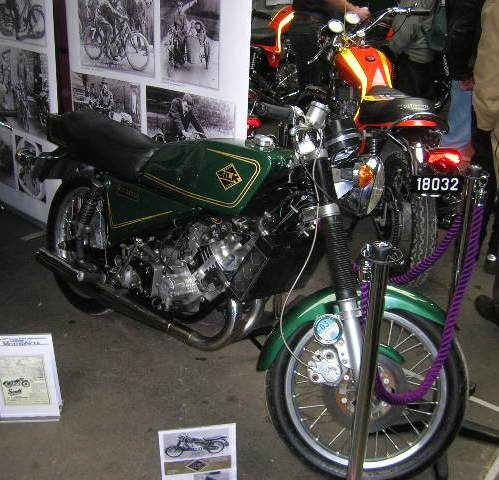
1970's Silk Scott

The 1970s also saw the launch of the George Silk Scott. Effectively one-off bespoke motorcycles, only about 22 were produced in the late 1960s and early 1970s, with the last being made in 1975. This incorporated the old Scott engine accommodated into a modern Spondon frame.

== Stationary engines ==
In the 1930s Scott manufactured a number of stationary engines with the aim of raising funds following the decline in motorcycle sales. Some of these engines were derived from motorcycle units, for instance the DSE was a watercooled version of the Lightweight Squirrel engine and the SE had the same bore and stroke dimensions as the long stroke Flyers. The SE does not have the same bore size as the Long Stroke Flyer (73 mm), it has a bore size of 78 mm, as confirmed on two Scott SE engines. The PA stationary engine however was different. Designed to meet a Ministry requirement for a portable electrical generator for the Bofors anti-aircraft gun and its Kerrison Predictor, it was produced during the Second World War by both Scott and its former partners Jowett. It was air-cooled, petroil-lubricated and featured a loop scavenge design with two opposed main transfer ports supplemented by a third "boost" port opposite the exhaust. This arrangement was patented by Scott in 1939, but is often mistakenly believed to be of post-war origin as it was later widely adopted for motorcycle racing engines and power boats after its reinvention in the late 1950s by East German motorcycle manufacturer MZ.

== See also ==
- Scott Model 3S

Records
Preceded by FN Four	Fastest production motorcycle 1912–1913	Succeeded by Williamson Flat Twin
