= Nacelle (disambiguation) =

A nacelle (/nəˈsɛl/ nə-SEL) is an (often streamlined) enclosure, which is part of, but mounted separately on, a larger technical object.

It may refer to:

- Nacelle, a streamlined housing for aircraft parts such as engines, fuel or equipment
  - Podded engine, an aircraft engine pre-assembled into a mounting pod (or nacelle)
- Nacelle (wind turbine), the part between the rotor and tower of a wind turbine that houses all of the generating components
- Gondola (airship), an external equipment or passenger compartment attached to a powered blimp or dirigible
- Gondola (balloon), a payload basket or capsule suspended beneath an unpowered hot air or gas balloon

== Other uses ==
- Nacelle (film producer), a television production and distribution company
