= Darley Abbey =

Suburb of Derby, England

Coordinates: 52.940987°N 1.478267°W

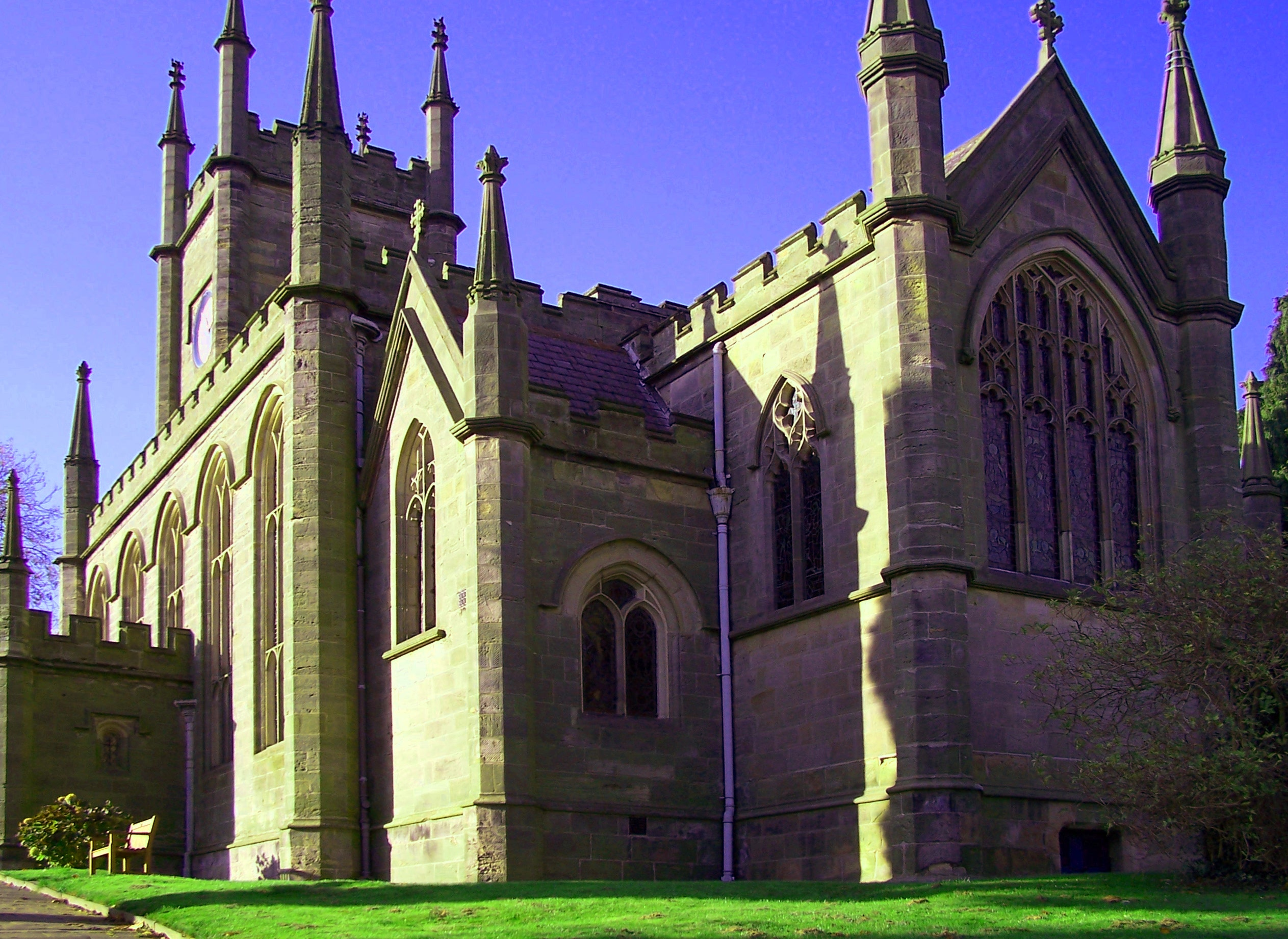
- St Matthew's Church

- Location within Derbyshire
- Unitary authority: Derby
- Ceremonial county: Derbyshire
- Region: East Midlands
- Country: England
- Sovereign state: United Kingdom
- Post town: Derby
- Postcode district: DE22
- Police: Derbyshire
- Fire: Derbyshire
- Ambulance: East Midlands

Darley Abbey is a former historic mill village, now a suburb of the city of Derby, in the ceremonial county of Derbyshire, England. It is located approximately 1.4 miles (2.3 km) north of the city centre, on the west bank of the River Derwent, and forms part of the Darley ward along with Little Chester and the West End. The settlement dates back to the medieval era, when it was the site of an Augustinian monastery. In the 18th century, the Evans family developed their planned industrial mill village in the area; Darley Abbey is now part of the Derwent Valley Mills World Heritage Site.

The area has been a part of the city (originally borough) of Derby since 1968 and is counted as part of Darley Ward.

== History ==
=== Darley Abbey (Monastery) ===
The Augustinian monastery of Darley Abbey has a rather confused foundation. In 1154, Robert de Ferrers, 2nd Earl of Derby made a donation to St Helen's Priory, Derby for them to establish a new religious house. He donated the churches of Uttoxeter and Crich, an oratory and cemetery at Osmaston, and tithes from his property in Derby and land in Oddebrook and Aldwark. A new monastery however was not constructed, as no suitable location was identified.

Around 1160, Hugh, the rural dean of Derby, donated his land at "Little Darley" to St Helen's Priory for the establishment of the monastery.

Darley Abbey was a daughter establishment to St Helen's Priory, however, shortly after its establishment, many of the canons of the Priory transferred to Darley, St Helen's serving as a hospital.

Darley Abbey received numerous donations, mainly from the burgesses of Derby, including land at Crich, Wessington, Youlgreave, Lea, Dethick, Tansley, Wigwell (where it held a grange) and Little Chester, and the advowsons of the churches at Brailsford, Bolsover, Pentrich, Ripley, Ashover, Scarcliffe, South Wingfield, and St Peter's, St Michael's, and St Werburgh's in Derby. The Abbey also came into the possession of the manors of Aldwark, Butterley, Normanton and Wessington.

Between 1250 and 1252 Ralph, son of Ralph de Wistanton, made numerous donations to the abbey, even though he was a man described as "of quite limited resources". The reason was that by donating to the abbey, Ralph could deprive the Jewish money-lenders of what he owed them, as Jews could not seize church property. Ralph eventually signed over all of his possessions to the abbey; the abbey in return provided him, his wife Joan, and their sons John and Nicholas, with food, clothing and "honourable lodgings". The family appears to have been very well cared for by the abbey, having been given both a servant and a handmaid, large amounts of food, seven gallons of beer a week, a horse, a large annual allowance of quality clothing, and small yearly pensions for additions purchases of clothing.

In 1291, the abbey is recorded as having an income of £72 19s. 3½d.

By the early 14th century, the abbey had fallen into poverty and two canons had to be sent to other monasteries as they could not be sustained at Darley. One source blames the abbey's poverty on failed harvests and heavy mortality of their cattle. Another, however, blames the Abbot of Darley, who is accused of "selling the woods and wasting the goods and leasing the lands of the abbey, to its great impoverishment".

The Valor Ecclesiasticus of 1535 recorded the abbey's income of £258 13s. 5d.

The Abbey was surrendered for dissolution on 22 October 1538.

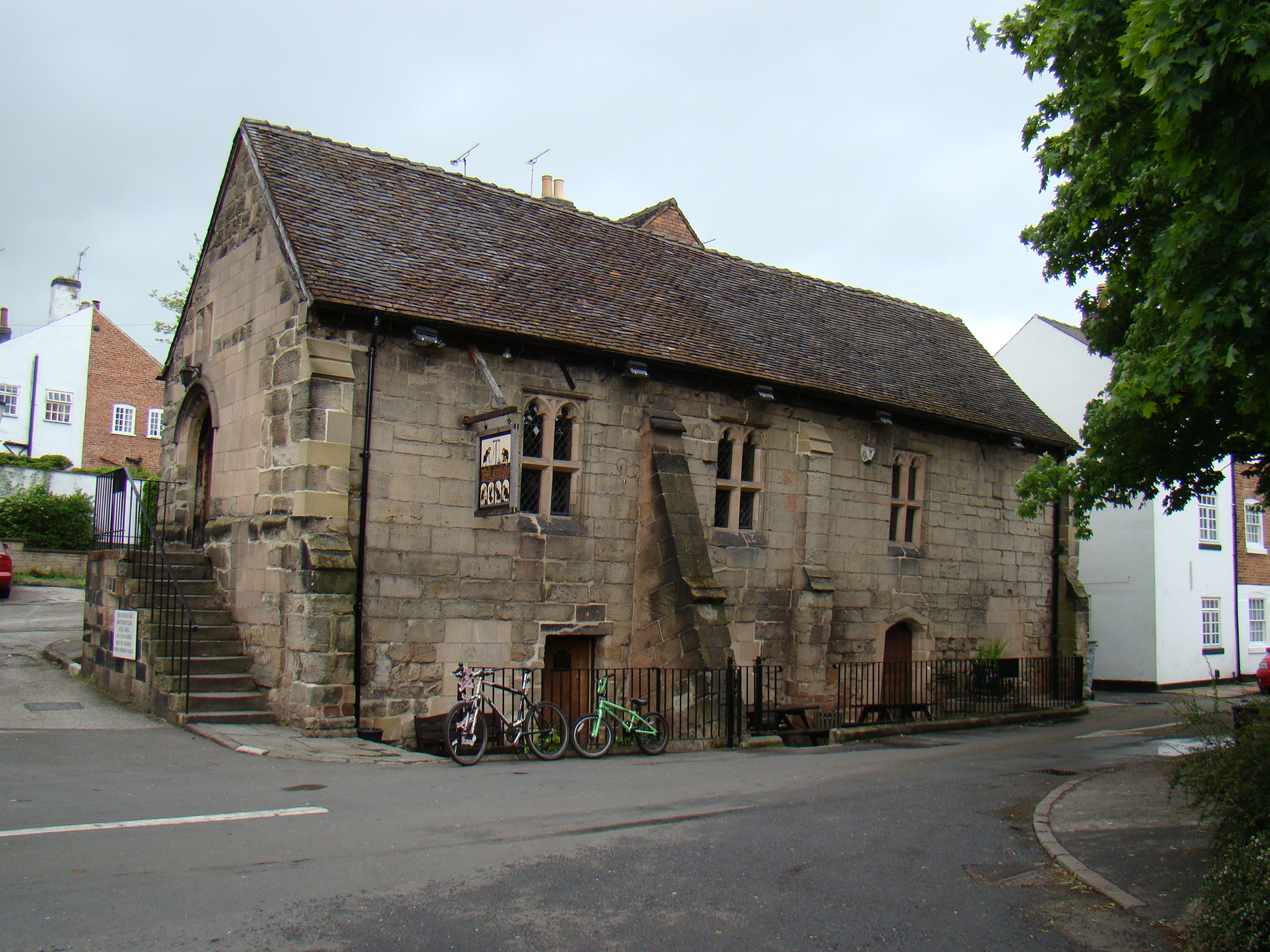
The Abbey Pub

There are only two remaining buildings from the monastic period. One is now the Abbey Pub (also known as the Abbey Inn), a Grade II* listed building. Constructed in the 15th century, it is thought to have been part of the Abbot's residence. The building appears to have been roofless for most of its post-dissolution life; a new roof was added in the 1920s and the building reinforced in the 1950s following some movement within the walls. The building was renovated to its present state in 1978. A Samuel Smith Old Brewery pub, it closed in 2019 reopened in 2024 for nine months then reopened again in June 2025.

The other monastic survivor makes up part of a private dwelling on Abbey Lane.

James Tuchet, 5th Baron Audley was buried at the Abbey after his death at the Battle of Blore Heath in 1459.

Darley Abbey was formerly a chapelry, in 1894 Darley Abbey became a separate civil parish, on 1 April 1968 the parish was abolished and merged with Derby. In 1961 the parish had a population of 2281. It is now in the unparished area of Derby, in the Derby district.

=== Mills ===
The industrial roots of Darley Abbey date back to the monastic period. After then, throughout the 17th and 18th centuries, a series of water powered mills – for corn, flint, leather and paper – were developed on land between Darley Street and the west bank of the River Derwent. The land on the opposite bank was acquired by Thomas Evans for his cotton mills in 1778.

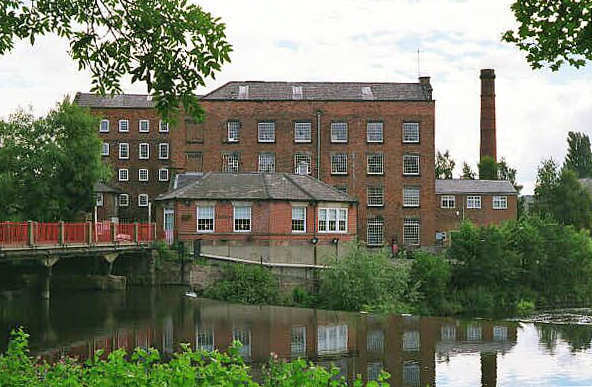
Boar's Head Mills

These mills later became known as the 'Boar's Head Mills' (the Evans family crest was a Boar's Head) and were constructed between 1782 and 1830. The Boar's Head Mills specialised in quality thread for sewing, embroidery and haberdashery. The site contains five main mills and a comprehensive range of ancillary structures, including warehouses, offices, stables, bobbin shops and domestic buildings. The largest of the buildings is 6-storeys high. The oldest building, Long Mill, has an attic floor which was (until 1819) used as a school room where children employed at the mill received a basic education. The mills were originally water-powered. The weirs on the River Derwent created the head of water which powered the wheels that drove the machinery in the mill buildings. Eventually, steam power was used to supplement the water power.

The Evans' involvement in the cotton mills ceased with the death of Walter Evans II in 1903. In 1905, John Peacock, hitherto manager, bought the mills from the estate. The Peacock family ran the business until 1943 when it was sold to J & P Coats of the Coats Viyella Group. Textile use ceased in 1970. In 1969 the sale of the mills for other uses began.

Today, Darley Abbey Mills is home to a variety of engineering and light industrial businesses. Since 2010, the focus of the Darley Abbey Mills has shifted away from light industrial uses towards customer facing entertainment and retail and other commercial office uses.

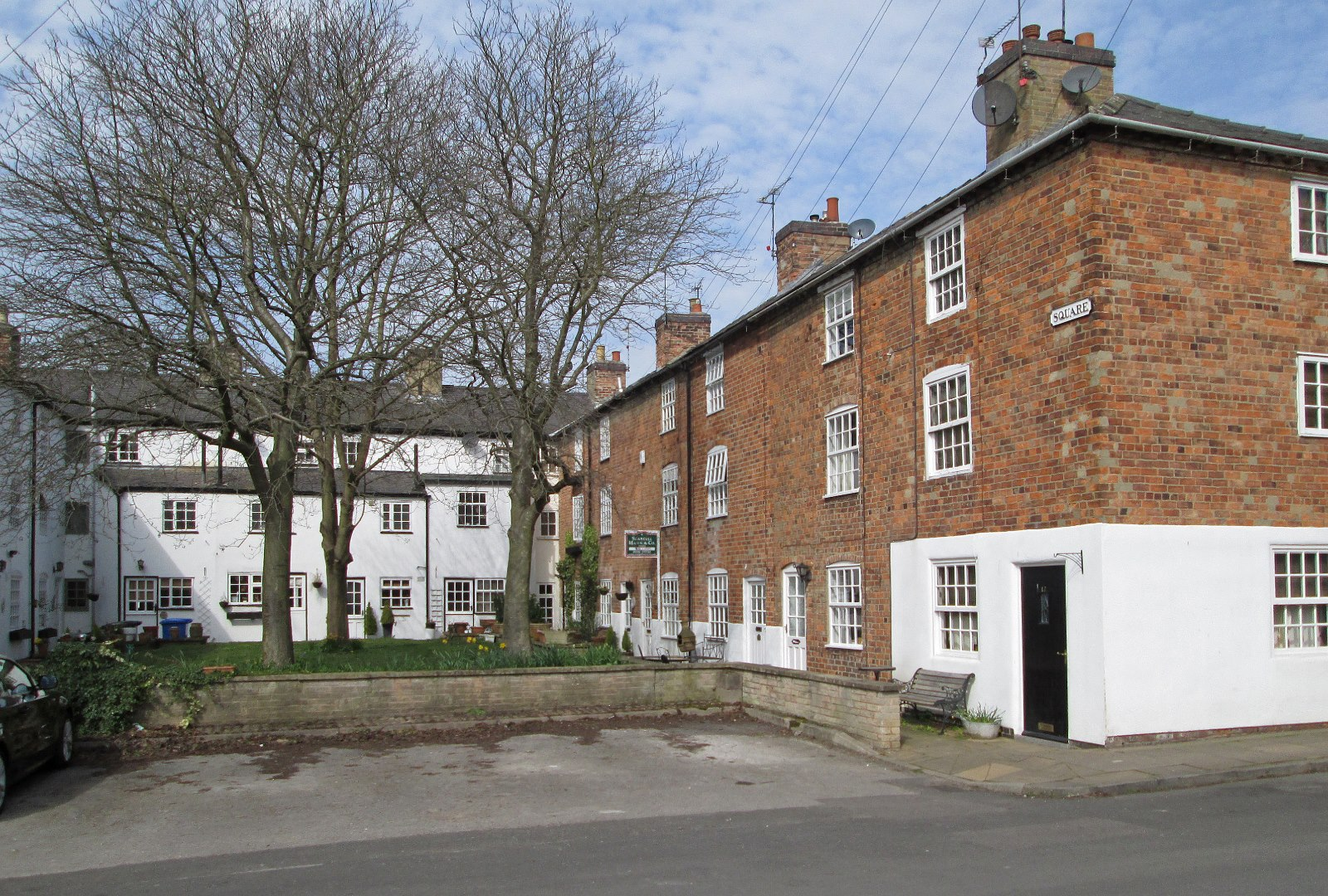
Flat Square

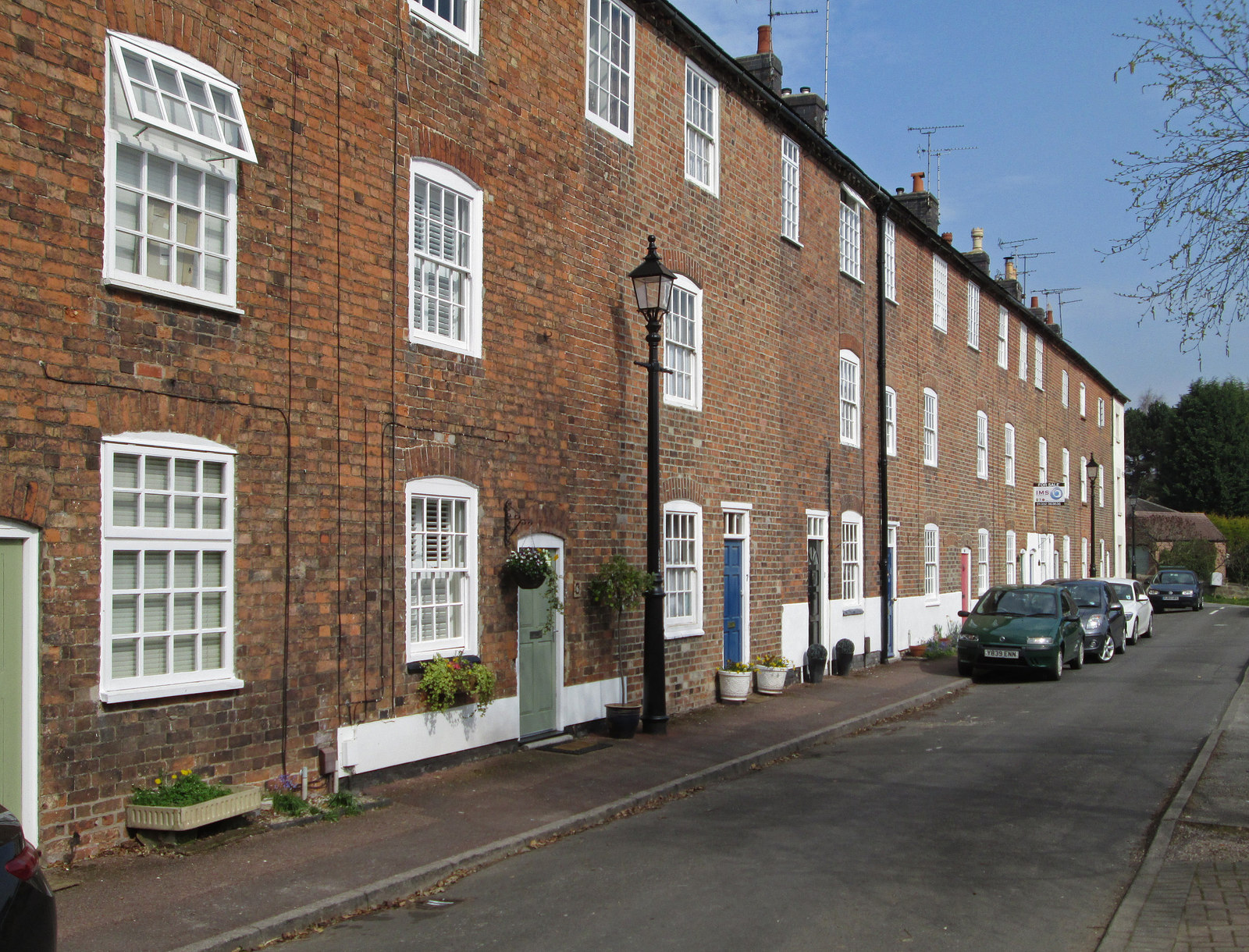
Brick Row

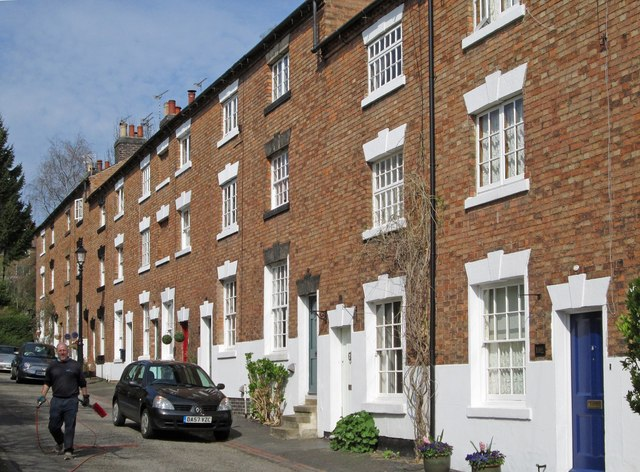
Lavender Row

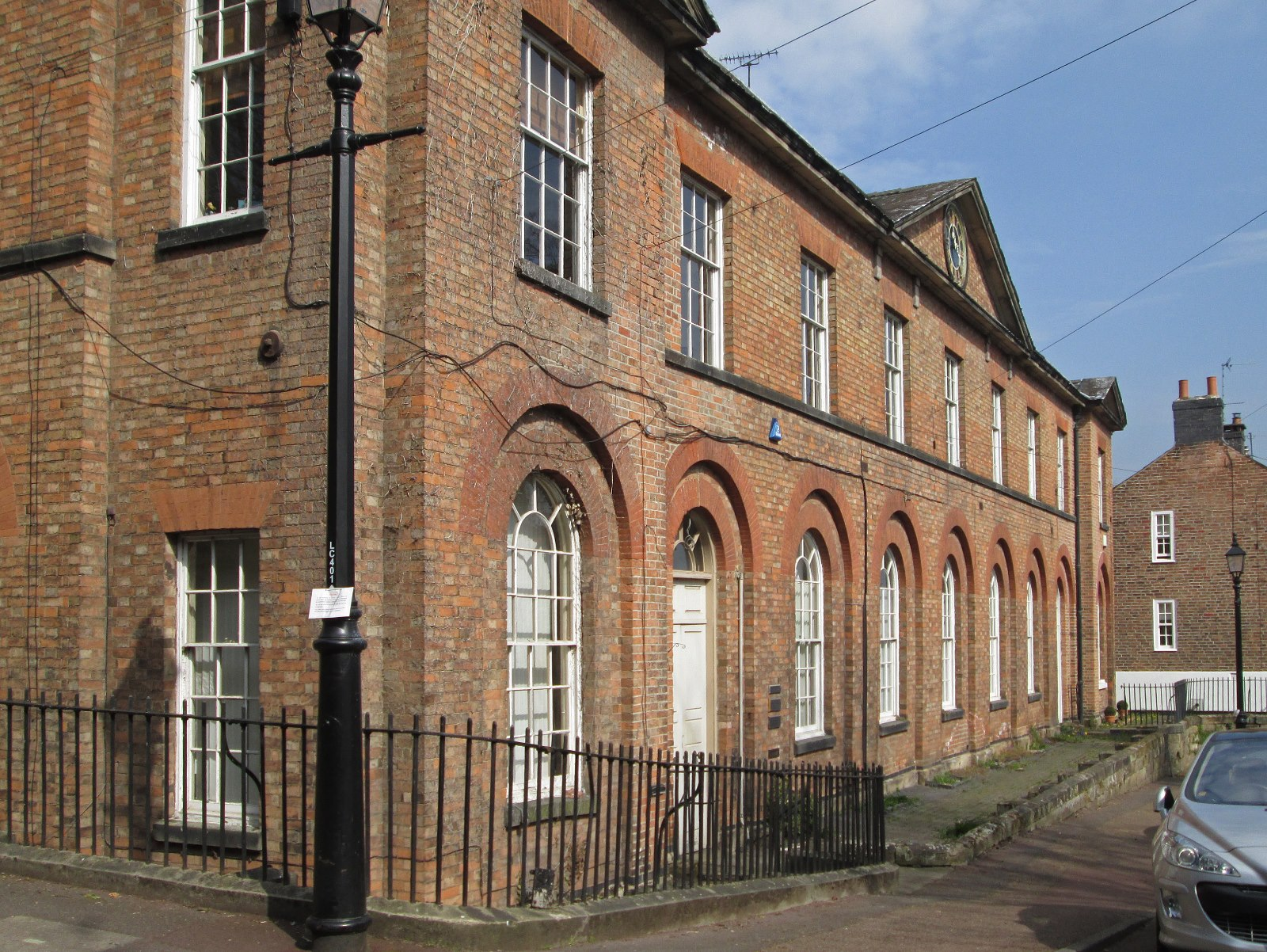
St Matthew's School

New Road

=== Village ===
The industrialist Thomas Evans developed cotton mills on the east side of the River Derwent at Darley Abbey and, between 1792 and 1826, effectively provided a new village of over 130 houses for his workers. The village was on the west side of the River Derwent and linked to the mills by a toll bridge.

In order of construction, the village included the following:

- 1792 – Darley Street (west side).
- 1792 – Flat Square and West Row. These 3-storey terraces formed three sides of an open square. This was a design concept introduced by Inigo Jones following his travels in Europe in the 1630.
- 1792 – "The Four Houses" off Mile Ash Lane. This is a block of four 3-storey houses built for mill foremen and their families and is the oldest surviving example of "cluster" housing in England.
- 1797 – Brick Row. This a brick-built terrace of 3-storey houses. The attic space above the houses in the centre of the row was deliberately planned as a school, replacing a room in Long Mill (across the river). It was used until the construction of St Matthew's School in 1819. The party walls in Brick Row were capable of adjustment to cope with differing sizes of worker families.
- 1800 – Lavender Row. A Georgian terrace, whose individual houses are "stepped" to cope with the inclined site.
- ???? – Upper part of Mile Ash Lane (lower part constructed in 1870s).
- 1819 – St Matthew's School. Designed by architect Moses Wood of Nottingham, it had spacious classrooms, well-lit by large windows and a handsome clock set high in the front wall. The school also incorporated houses for a schoolmaster and schoolmistress at opposite ends of the building.
- 1819 – St Matthew's Church (see section below).
- 1826 – White-painted terraces on New Road. These consisted of two 4-house clusters and are built of brick, although the facades are rendered and painted white. These were occupied by senior mill employees.

A traveller in 1829 wrote favourably of the village as follows: "I passed through Darley, interesting as the seat of the extensive cotton and paper mills of the Messrs, Evans, and also as an exhibition of their unwearied philanthropy to their numerous work-people. The whole forms a neat town, displaying general comfort, with institutions of all kinds, for the improvement of the physical and moral condition of some hundred families….kindness and rewards are constantly bestowed in promoting cleanliness and neatness, and in stimulating industry and good conduct. All that Mr Owen has benevolently fancied, these gentlemen and this amiable lady have realised. It was cheering to view the neatness and comfort of the houses, the honey-suckles, jessamines, and roses growing in front, and the domestic occupations of persons who, in the same employment, in worse conducted establishments, live in filth, rags and squalid misery."

St Matthew's Church – Porch and Nave

St Matthew's Church – Porch Door

=== Church ===
After the Dissolution of the Monasteries, Darley Abbey had no church. Villagers had to travel to St Alkmund's Church, Derby until 1819. Then, Walter Evans, one of the family who owned the mills, paid for the building of St Matthew's Church with a small contribution from a central government fund. The architect was Henry Moses Wood of Nottingham (who also designed St Matthew's School). The design was in the Gothic Perpendicular style. The stone used in its construction was quarried locally from King's Croft Allestree, Pentrich, and Wirksworth. The church was substantially extended in 1895–96.

=== Conservation ===
Because of the historical significance of Darley Abbey, much of the village has been designated as a conservation area and, as such, it is subject to enhanced development controls. The conservation area includes the mills, the housing associated with the mills, the park and the church.

Darley Abbey is also part of the Derwent Valley Mills World Heritage Site which stretches from Matlock Bath to Derby.

== Features ==
- Darley Park is an 80-acre (32-hectare) picturesque park featuring many different gardens and wildlife areas, including national collections of viburnums and hydrangeas. Given to the people of Derby in 1931 by the Evans family, who lived at Darley Hall. The Hall was demolished in the early 1960s, but parts of the original ground floor remain, now used as terracing for a small cafe. Darley Park used to play host to the Darley Park open-air concert, which used to be one of the largest free concerts in the country. Darley Park is also home to Darley Abbey Cricket Club, which runs several teams that play as part of the Derbyshire County Cricket League.
- Saint Benedict Catholic Voluntary Academy is one of the largest schools in Derby with around 1500 pupils. The school dates back to 1986, but with several schools previously occupying the site including St Ralph Sherwin.
- Saint Mary's Catholic School is a historic coeducational Catholic school that can trace its roots back to 1813/1814 and has since moved to a new building on three separate occasions.

== See also ==
- Listed buildings in Darley Abbey
