= List of monastic houses in Derbyshire =

Locations of monastic houses in Derbyshire
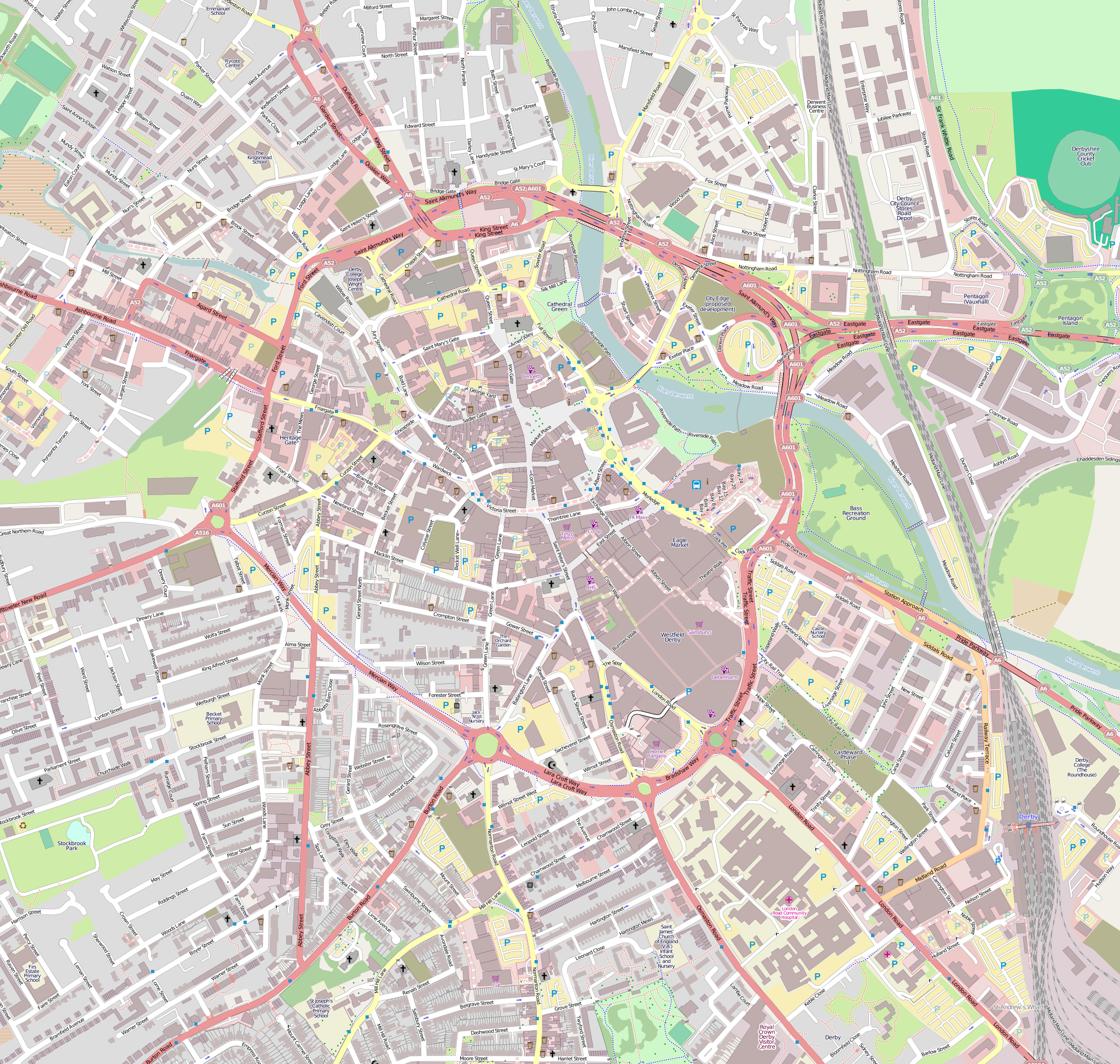
Locations of monastic houses in Derby

The following is a list of the monastic houses in Derbyshire, England.

Alien houses are included, as are smaller establishments such as cells and notable monastic granges (particularly those with resident monks), and also camerae of the military orders of monks (Knights Templar and Knights Hospitaller). Monastic hospitals are included where they had the status or function of an abbey, priory, or preceptor/commandery.

Abbreviations and key

Status of remains
Symbol	Status
None	Ruins
*	Current monastic function
^{+}	Current non-monastic ecclesiastic function (including remains incorporated into later structure)
^	Current non-ecclesiastic function (including remains incorporated into later structure) or redundant intact structure
^{$}	Remains limited to earthworks etc.
^{#}	No identifiable trace of the monastic foundation remains
^{~}	Exact site of monastic foundation unknown
^{≈}	Identification ambiguous or confused

Locations with names in italics indicate possible duplication (misidentification with another location) or non-existent foundations (either erroneous reference or proposed foundation never implemented) or ecclesiastical establishments with a monastic name but lacking actual monastic connection.

Trusteeship
EH	English Heritage
LT	Landmark Trust
NT	National Trust

Foundation	Image	Communities & provenance	Formal name or dedication & alternative names	References & location
Barrow Camera ^^{?}		Knights Hospitaller founded before 1189: church granted by Robert de Bakepuze; probably not inhabited by brothers for long periods; annexed to Yeaveley before 1433; remains possibly incorporated into Arleston House built on site 16th/17th century		52°51′48″N 1°30′03″W
Beauchief Abbey	Historical county location. See entry under List of monastic houses in South Yorkshire			
Bradbourne Priory		Augustinian Canons Regular cell? dependent on Dunstable, Bedfordshire founded 1238: granted by Geoffrey de Cauceis; dissolved ?	Church of All Saints, Bradbourne	53°04′18″N 1°41′27″W
Breadsall Priory		Augustinian Canons Regular founded between 1220 and 1266; (erroneous ref. to Friars Eremites (Austin Friars) in records of 1266) (Note: Breadsall — Patent Roll 1266, gives Austin Friars: Victoria County History, A History of the County of Derby; the error lead T. Tanner, Notitia Monastica, p.83 and Dugdale, Monasticon Anglicanum to assert that the house was initially of friars); dissolved 1536; granted to Henry, Duke of Suffolk 1552; 13th-century arch retained in the basement of Elizabethan mansion built on site, became hotel and golf club 'Marriott Breadsall Priory Hotel' 1980	The Priory Church of the Holy Trinity, Breadsall ____________________; Brisoll Priory; Bredsall Park	52°58′08″N 1°26′02″W
Calke Priory ^{#}		Augustinian Canons Regular founded c.1131/before 1129-39 or 1130-6/before 1161 by Maud, widow of the Earl of Chester; transferred to Repton 1153–1172; dissolved 1538; granted to John, Earl of Warwick 1547; mansion named 'Calke Abbey' built on site	The Priory Church of Saint Giles, Calke ____________________; Calke Cell	^{&} 52°48′02″N 1°27′26″W
Dale (Stanley Park) Abbey, Deepdale		hermitage 12th century Augustinian Canons Regular dependent on Calke; cell founded 1153-8 by Serlo de Grendon; canons recalled to Calke c.1184; Premonstratensian Canons from Tupholme, Lincolnshire; founded ?c.1185; canons recalled to Tupholme c.1192; canons transferred from Welbeck, Nottinghamshire c.1196; canons transferred from Newsham (Newhouse), Lincolnshire c.1200; avoided suppression 1536 by payment of substantial fine; dissolved 24 October 1538	The Abbey Church of the Blessed Virgin Mary, Dale ____________________; Stanley Park Abbey; (De Parco Stanley); Le Dale Abbey	52°56′39″N 1°21′02″W
Darley Priory ^{^}		Augustinian Canons Regular daughter house of St Helen's, Derby; founded c.1146 by Robert de Ferraris (Ferrers), Earl of Derby: transferred from St Helen's; dissolved 22 October 1538; granted to Sir William West 1540/1; house named 'Darley Park' built on site 18th century, demolished 1962; a monastic building (probably the priory guest house) is now 15th century Darley Abbey public house — 'Old Abbey Inn'; partly 15th-century cottage at 7 Abbey Lane may incorporate monastic remains	The Priory Church of Saint Mary, Darley ____________________; Darley Abbey; Little Derby Friary; Little Dirby Friary	52°56′28″N 1°28′42″W
Derby Blackfriars		Dominican Friars (under the Visitation of Oxford) founded before 1239; dissolved 3 January 1539; occupied by an 18th-century Friary Hotel built on site; converted into a public house 1996; currently in use as a nightclub	The Annunciation	52°55′23″N 1°29′02″W
Derby — King's Mead Priory		Benedictine nuns founded 1149-59 (c.1160) by the abbess of Derby; dissolved 1536; granted to Francis, Earl of Shrewsbury 1543/4; site now occupied by a 16th/17th-century building	St Mary ____________________; De Pratis Priory	52°55′35″N 1°29′22″W
Derby Priory (Augustinian)		Augustinian Canons Regular founded 1137 by Towyne, a burgess of Derby; most of the monks transferred to Darley c.1146; reduced to cell 1154; became a hospital 1160; ceased before 1360	The Priory Church of Saint Helen, Derby	52°55′37″N 1°28′52″W
Derby Priory (Cluniac)		Cluniac monks alien house: priory cell dependent on Bermondsey, Surrey (Greater London); founded before 1140; granted to Bermondsey by Waltheof, son of Sweyn; accidentally destroyed by fire; rebuilt c.1335; became denizen: independent from 1395; dissolved 1536;	The Priory Church of Saint James, Derby	52°55′21″N 1°28′42″W
Gresley Priory		Augustinian Canons Regular founded c.1135-40 by William de Greisley (or Fitz-Nigel); dissolved 1536; granted to Henry Cruche 1543/4; nave of the priory church in use as parochial church of Church Gresley	The Priory Church of Saint Mary and Saint George, Gresley ____________________; Church Gresley Priory; Greisley Priory	52°45′35″N 1°34′01″W
Lees Priory		Augustinian Canons Regular ?cell dependent on Rocester, Staffordshire; founded before c.1160?; dissolved after 1517?	Leyes Priory	53°12′31″N 1°37′38″W
Locko Preceptory		St. Lazarus Hospitallers and Leper Hospital founded c.1297; dissolved 1375	The Hospital of Saint Mary Magdalene ____________________; Lockhay Preceptory	52°56′16″N 1°23′29″W
Repton Priory ^^{+}		Anglo-Saxon monks and nuns — double monastery founded before 660 traditionally by St David; destroyed in raids by the Danes 874; Augustinian Canons Regular — from Calke founded c.1153-9; rebuilt 1172 by Maud, widow of Ranulph, Earl of Chester; dissolved 25 October 1538; remains incorporated into Repton School buildings (founded 1557); St Wystan's Church on site incorporates substantial remains of the Anglo-Saxon foundation	St Wystan The Priory Church of the Holy Trinity, Repton ____________________; Repingdon Priory	52°50′28″N 1°33′02″W; 52°50′28″N 1°33′06″W
Yeaveley Preceptory, Stydd		Knights Hospitaller founded c.1136 (or c.1190 or 1268?) by Ralph de Fun and Sir William Meynill; dissolved 1535 (1540); granted to Charles, Lord Montjoy 1543/4; remains incorporated into farmhouse; the Church of St Saviour was part of the Hospitallers' possessions	St Mary and St John the Baptist ____________________; Yeaveley and Barrow Preceptory; Stydd Preceptory; Stede Preceptory; Yeveley Preceptory; Yeaveley and Stydd Preceptory	52°57′26″N 1°44′43″W; 52°57′26″N 1°44′43″W

The following location in Derbyshire lacks monastic connection:

Beightonfields Priory: a 17th- to 19th-century country house

== See also ==
- List of monastic houses in England
