= List of monasteries dissolved by Henry VIII of England =

These monasteries were dissolved by King Henry VIII of England in the dissolution of the monasteries. The list is by no means exhaustive, since over 800 religious houses existed before the Reformation, and virtually every town, of any size, had at least one abbey, priory, convent or friary in it. (Often many small houses of monks, nuns, canons or friars.)

Image	Name	Location	Current county	Order	Year dissolved	Ref(s)
	Abbotsbury Abbey	Abbotsbury	Dorset	Benedictine	1538	
	Abingdon Abbey	Abingdon	Oxfordshire	Benedictine	1538	
	Bardney Abbey	Bardney	Lincolnshire	Benedictine	1538	
	Bardsey Abbey	Aberdaron	Gwynedd	Canons Regular	1537	
	Barking Abbey	Barking	Greater London	Benedictine	1539	
	Basingwerk Abbey	Holywell	Flintshire	Cistercian	1536	
	Bath Abbey	Bath	Somerset	Benedictine	1539	
	Battle Abbey	Battle	East Sussex	Benedictine	1538	
	Bayham Old Abbey	Lamberhurst	Kent	Premonstratensian	1525	
	Beauvale Priory	Hucknall	Nottinghamshire	Carthusian	1539	
	Beaulieu Abbey	Beaulieu	Hampshire	Cistercian	1538	
	Belvoir Priory	Belvoir	Leicestershire	Benedictine	1539	
	Bindon Abbey	Wool	Dorset	Cistercian	1539	
	Binham Priory	Binham	Norfolk	Benedictine	1539	
	Bisham Abbey	Bisham	Berkshire	Augustinian	1538	
	Blackfriars, Derby	Derby	Derbyshire	Dominican	1539	
	Blackfriars, Leicester	Leicester	Leicestershire	Dominican	1538	
	Blackfriars, Newcastle	Newcastle upon Tyne	Tyne and Wear	Dominican	1536	
	Bodmin Priory	Bodmin	Cornwall	Augustinian	1539	
	Bolton Abbey	Bolton Abbey	North Yorkshire	Augustinian	1540	
	Bourne Abbey	Bourne	Lincolnshire	Arrouaisian	1536	
	Boxgrove Priory	Boxgrove	West Sussex	Benedictine	1536	
	Boxley Abbey	Boxley	Kent	Cistercian	1537	
	Bradley Priory	Bradley	Leicestershire	Augustinian	1536	
	Breadsall Priory	Breadsall	Derbyshire	Canons Regular	1536	
	Breedon Priory	Breedon on the Hill	Leicestershire	Canons Regular	1539	
	Bridlington Priory	Bridlington	East Riding of Yorkshire	Canons Regular	1538	
	Brinkburn Priory	Brinkburn	Northumberland	Augustinian	1536	
	Brooke Priory	Brooke	Rutland	Canons Regular	1535/6	
	Bruern Abbey	Bruern	Oxfordshire	Cistercian	1536	
	Bruton Abbey	Bruton	Somerset	Augustinian Canons	1539	
	Buckfast Abbey	Buckfastleigh	Devon	Cistercian	1539	
	Buckland Abbey	Buckland Monachorum	Devon	Cistercian	1539	
	Buildwas Abbey	Buildwas	Shropshire	Cistercian	1536	
	Burnham Abbey	Burnham	Buckinghamshire	Augustinian canonesses	1539	
	Byland Abbey	Byland with Wass	North Yorkshire	Cistercian	1538	
	Calke Priory	Calke	Derbyshire	Augustinian	1538	
	Canons Ashby Priory	Canons Ashby	Northamptonshire	Canons Regular	1536	
	Cardigan Priory	Cardigan	Ceredigion	Benedictine	1538	
	Carmarthen Friary	Carmarthen	Carmarthenshire	Franciscan	1538	
	Carmarthen Priory	Carmarthen	Carmarthenshire	Canons Regular	1536	
	Cartmel Priory	Lower Allithwaite	Cumbria	Canons Regular	1536	
	Castle Acre Priory	Castle Acre	Norfolk	Cluniac	1537	
	Cerne Abbey	Cerne Abbas	Dorset	Benedictine	1539	
	Charterhouse London	City of London	Greater London	Carthusian	1537	
	Christchurch Priory	Christchurch	Dorset	Augustinian	1539	
	Cirencester Abbey	Cirencester	Gloucestershire	Augustinian	1539	
	Cleeve Abbey	Old Cleeve	Somerset	Cistercian	1536	
	Coggeshall Abbey	Coggeshall	Essex	Cistercian	1538	
	Colchester Abbey	Colchester	Essex	Benedictine	1539	
	Colne Priory	Earls Colne	Essex	Benedictine	1536	
	Cranborne Priory	Cranborne	Dorset	Benedictine	1540	
	Crowland Abbey	Crowland	Lincolnshire	Benedictine	1539	
	Croxden Abbey	Croxden	Staffordshire	Cistercian	1538	
	Croxton Abbey	Croxton Kerrial	Leicestershire	Premonstratensian	1538	
	Dalby and Heather Preceptory	Old Dalby	Leicestershire	Knights Hospitaller	1538	
	Dale Abbey	Dale Abbey	Derbyshire	Premonstratensian	1538	
	Darley Abbey	Darley Abbey	Derbyshire	Canons Regular	1538	
	Delapré Abbey	Northampton	Northamptonshire	Cluniac Nunnery	1538	
	Dore Abbey	Abbey Dore	Herefordshire	Cistercian	1536	
	Dudley Priory	Dudley	West Midlands	Cluniac	1539	
	Dunstable Priory	Dunstable	Bedfordshire	Augustinian	1540	
	Easby Abbey	Easby	North Yorkshire	Premonstratensian	1537	
	Egglestone Abbey	Barnard Castle	County Durham	Premonstratensian	1540	
	Ewenny Priory	Ewenny	Vale of Glamorgan	Benedictine	1536	
	Eye Priory	Eye	Suffolk	Benedictine	1537	
	Eynsham Abbey	Eynsham	Oxfordshire	Benedictine	1538	
	Finchale Priory	Durham	County Durham	Benedictine	1535	
	Folkestone Priory	Folkestone	Kent	Benedictine	1535	
	Forde Abbey	Thorncombe	Dorset	Cistercian	1539	
	Fountains Abbey	Lindrick with Studley Royal and Fountains	North Yorkshire	Cistercian	1539	
	Furness Abbey	Barrow in Furness	Cumbria	Cistercian	1537	
	Garendon Abbey	Shepshed	Leicestershire	Cistercian	1536	
	Gisborough Priory	Guisborough	North Yorkshire	Augustinian	1540	
	Glastonbury Abbey	Glastonbury	Somerset	Benedictine	1539	
	Grace Dieu Priory	Thringstone	Leicestershire	Augustine	1538	
	Greyfriars, Leicester	Leicester	Leicestershire	Franciscan	1538	
	Great Malvern Priory	Malvern	Worcestershire	Benedictine	1539	
	Gresley Priory	Church Gresley	Derbyshire	Augustinian	1536	
	Hailes Abbey	Stanway	Gloucestershire	Cistercian	1539	
	Halesowen Abbey	Halesowen	West Midlands	Premonstratensian	1538	
	Haltemprice Priory	Willerby	East Riding of Yorkshire	Augustinian	1536	
	Haughmond Abbey	Uffington	Shropshire	Augustinian	1539	
	Haverholme Priory	Ewerby and Evedon	Lincolnshire	Cistercian	1539	
	Hexham Abbey	Hexham	Northumberland	Benedictine	1537	
	Holy Trinity Priory	Aldgate, City of London	Greater London	Augustinian	1532	
	Horton Priory	Horton	Dorset	Benedictine	1539	
	Jarrow Priory	Jarrow	Tyne and Wear	Benedictine	1536	
	Jervaulx Abbey	East Witton	North Yorkshire	Cistercian	1537	
	Kidwelly Priory	Kidwelly	Carmarthenshire	Benedictine	1539	
	King's Mead Priory	Derby	Derbyshire	Benedictine	1536	
	Kirby Bellars Priory	Kirby Bellars	Leicestershire	Canons Regular	1536	
	Kirkstall Abbey	Leeds	West Yorkshire	Cistercian	1539	
	Lacock Abbey	Lacock	Wiltshire	Augustinian	1539	
	Lanercost Priory	Burtholme	Cumbria	Augustinian	1538	
	Langdon Abbey	Dover	Kent	Premonstratensian	1535	
	Langley Priory		Leicestershire	Benedictine	1536	
	Launceston Priory	Launceston, Cornwall	Cornwall	Canons Regular	1538	
	Launde Priory		Leicestershire	Canons Regular	1539	
	Leicester Abbey	Leicester	Leicestershire	Canons Regular	1538	
	Leicester Austin Friary	Leicester	Leicestershire	Austin Friars	1538	
	Lenton Priory	Lenton, Nottingham	Nottinghamshire	Cluniac	1538	
	Leonard Stanley Priory	Leonard Stanley	Gloucestershire	Benedictine	1538	
	Lewes Priory	Lewes	East Sussex	Cluniac	1537	
	Lindisfarne Priory	Holy Island	Northumberland	Benedictine	1536	
	Llanthony Priory	Crucorney	Monmouthshire	Canons Regular	1538	
	Ludlow Austin Friars	Ludlow	Shropshire	Austin Friars	1538	
	Ludlow White Friars	Ludlow	Shropshire	Carmelites	1538	
	Maenan Abbey	Llanddoged and Maenan	Conwy	Cistercian	1536	
	Malmesbury Abbey	Malmesbury	Wiltshire	Benedictine	1539	
	Margam Abbey	Margam	Neath Port Talbot	Cistercian	1536	
	Mattersey Priory	Mattersey	Nottinghamshire	Gilbertine	1538	
	Merton Priory	Merton	London	Augustinian	1538	
	Michelham Priory	Arlington	East Sussex	Augustinian	1537	
	Milton Abbey	Milton Abbas	Dorset	Benedictine	1539	
	Monk Bretton Priory	Lundwood	South Yorkshire	Cluniac	1538	
	Monkwearmouth Abbey	Sunderland	Tyne and Wear	Benedictine	1536	
	Mount Grace Priory	East Harlsey	North Yorkshire	Carthusian	1539	
	Neath Abbey	Dyffryn Clydach	Neath Port Talbot	Cistercian	1539	
	Netley Abbey	Hound	Hampshire	Cistercian	1536	
	Newark Priory	Ripley	Surrey	Augustinian	1538	
	Newbo Abbey	Sedgebrook	Lincolnshire	Premonstratensian	1536	
	Newminster Abbey	Morpeth	Northumberland	Cistercian	1537	
	Newstead Abbey	Newstead	Nottinghamshire	Augustinian	1539	
	Nostell Priory	Nostell	West Yorkshire	Augustinian	1540	
	Nuneaton Priory	Nuneaton	Warwickshire	Benedictine	1539	
	Owston Abbey		Leicestershire	Canons Regular	1536	
	Pontefract Priory	Pontefract	West Yorkshire	Cluniac	1540	
	Penmon Priory	Llangoed	Isle of Anglesey	Augustinian	1538	
	Pershore Abbey	Pershore	Worcestershire	Benedictine	1539	
	Plympton Priory	Plympton	Devon	Canons Regular	1539	
	Povington Priory	Tyneham	Dorset	Benedictine		
	Prittlewell Priory	Prittlewell	Essex	Cluniac	1536	
	Quarr Abbey	Nr. Fishbourne	Isle of Wight	Cistercian	1536	
	Ramsey Abbey	Ramsey	Cambridgeshire	Benedictine	1539?	
	Reading Abbey	Reading	Berkshire	Cluniac	1538	
	Repton Priory	Repton	Derbyshire	Augustinian	1538	
	Revesby Abbey	Revesby	Lincolnshire	Cistercian	1538	
	Rievaulx Abbey	Rievaulx	North Yorkshire	Cistercian	1538	
	Roche Abbey	Maltby	South Yorkshire	Cistercian	1538	
	Romsey Abbey	Romsey	Hampshire	Benedictine	1539	
	Rufford Abbey	Rufford	Nottinghamshire	Cistercian	1536	
	Rushen Abbey	Malew	Isle of Man	Cistercian	1540	
	Sawley Abbey	Sawley	Lancashire	Cistercian	1536	
	Selby Abbey	Selby	North Yorkshire	Benedictine	1539	
	Sempringham Priory	Pointon and Sempringham	Lincolnshire	Gilbertine	1538	
	Shaftesbury Abbey	Shaftesbury	Dorset	? Nunnery	1539	
	Shap Abbey	Shap Rural	Cumbria	Premonstratensian	1540	
	Sherborne Abbey	Sherborne	Dorset	Benedictine	1539	
	Shrewsbury Abbey	Shrewsbury	Shropshire	Benedictine	1540	
	Sibton Abbey	Yoxford	Suffolk	Cistercian	1536	
	St Albans Abbey	St Albans	Hertfordshire	Benedictine	1539	
	St Augustine's Abbey	Canterbury	Kent	Benedictine	1538	
	St Bartholomew's Priory, Smithfield	Smithfield, City of London	Greater London	Augustinian	1539	
	St Bees Priory	St Bees	Cumbria	Benedictine	1539	
	St Botolph's Priory	Colchester	Essex	Augustinian	1536	
	St Faith Priory	Horsham St Faith and Newton St Faith	Norfolk	Benedictine	1536	
	St Gregory's Priory	Canterbury	Kent	Augustinian	1535	
	St Helen's Priory, Bishopsgate	Bishopsgate, City of London	Greater London	Benedictine	1538	
	St. James Priory, Derby	Derby	Derbyshire	Cluniac	1536	
	St. John the Baptist Priory	Andover, Hampshire	Hampshire		1538	
	St Mary's Abbey	Kenilworth	Warwickshire	Augustinian	1538	
	St Mary's Abbey	York	North Yorkshire	Benedictine	1539	
	St Mary's Priory	Coventry	West Midlands (county)	Benedictine	1539	
	St Osyth's Priory	St Osyth	Essex	Augustinian	1539	
	St Peter's Abbey	Gloucester	Gloucestershire	Benedictine	1540	
	St Werburgh's Abbey	Chester	Cheshire	Benedictine	1538	
	Strata Florida Abbey	Ystrad Fflur	Ceredigion	Cistercian	1539	
	Stoneleigh Abbey	Stoneleigh	Warwickshire	Cistercian	1539	
	Stratford Langthorne Abbey	West Ham	Greater London	Cistercian	1538	
	Syon Abbey	Heston and Isleworth	Greater London	Bridgettine	1539	
	Talley Abbey	Talley	Carmarthenshire	Premonstratensian	1536	
	Tarrant Abbey	Tarrant Crawford	Dorset	Cistercian	1539	
	Tavistock Abbey	Tavistock	Devon	Benedictine	1539	
	Tewkesbury Abbey	Tewkesbury	Gloucestershire	Benedictine	1539	
	Thetford Priory	Thetford	Norfolk	Cluniac	1540	
	Thornton Abbey	Thornton Curtis	Lincolnshire	Augustinian	1539	
	Tintern Abbey	Tintern	Monmouthshire	Cistercian	1536	
	Titchfield Abbey	Fareham	Hampshire	Premonstratensian	1537	
	Tynemouth Priory	Tynemouth	Tyne and Wear	Benedictine	1538	
	Ulverscroft Priory	Ulverscroft	Leicestershire	Canons Regular	1539	
	Vale Royal Abbey	Whitegate and Marton	Cheshire	Cistercian	1538	
	Valle Crucis Abbey	Llantysilio	Denbighshire	Cistercian	1537	
	Walsingham Priory	Walsingham	Norfolk	Canons Regular	1538	
	Waltham Abbey	Waltham Abbey	Essex	Canons Regular	1540	
	Wareham Priory	Wareham	Dorset	Carthusian	1539	
	Waverley Abbey	Farnham	Surrey	Cistercian	1536	
	Welbeck Abbey	Welbeck	Nottinghamshire	Premonstratensian	1538	
	Wenlock Priory	Much Wenlock	Shropshire	Cluniac	1540	
	Westminster Abbey	Westminster	Greater London	Benedictine	1539	
	Whalley Abbey	Whalley	Lancashire	Cistercian	1537	
	Whitby Abbey	Whitby	North Yorkshire	Benedictine	1540	
	Whitland Abbey	Llanboidy	Carmarthenshire	Cistercian	1539	
	Woburn Abbey	Woburn	Bedfordshire	Cistercian	1538	
	Woodspring Priory	Kewstoke	Somerset	Augustinian	1536	
	Worcester Priory	Worcester	Worcestershire	Benedictine	1540	
	Yeaveley Preceptory	Yeaveley	Derbyshire	Knights Hospitaller	1540	

== See also ==
- Dissolution of the Lesser Monasteries Act
- Second Act of Dissolution
- List of monastic houses in England
- List of monastic houses in Wales
- List of monastic houses in Ireland
