= William Drury Lowe =

William Drury Lowe may refer to:

- William Drury Lowe (landowner, born 1753), British merchant of Bread Street made High Sheriff of Derbyshire in 1795
- William Drury Lowe (landowner, born 1802), British landowner made High Sheriff of Derbyshire in 1854

== See also ==
- William Lowe (disambiguation)
