= William Lowe =

William Lowe may refer to:

== Sports ==
- William Lowe (cricketer) (1873–1945), English cricketer
- William Lowe (footballer) (1877–1957), English footballer
- William O. Lowe (1894–1949), American college football player
- William Lowe (athlete) (1901–?), Irish sprinter
- William Lowe (bowls), Scottish lawn bowls player
- Arch Lowe (William Archibald Burnside Lowe, 1875–1942), Australian rules footballer
- Kid Lowe (William McKinley Lowe, 1900–1988), American baseball player

== Others ==
- William Lowe (British Army officer) (1861–1944)
- William Lowe (civil servant) (1831–1862), British district magistrate and civil servant in India
- William C. Lowe (1941–2013), IBM executive and "Father of the IBM PC"
- William Drury Lowe (landowner, born 1753), British merchant of Bread Street made High Sheriff of Derbyshire in 1795
- William Drury Lowe (landowner, born 1802) (1802–1877), English landowner and High Sheriff of Derbyshire
- William Henry Lowe (died 1900), Scottish physician and amateur botanist
- William James Lowe, Canadian politician
- William M. Lowe (1842–1882), American politician in Alabama
- William Warren Lowe (1831–1898), Union Army officer
