= Derby Blackfriars =

Monastery in Derby, England

Derby Black Friary
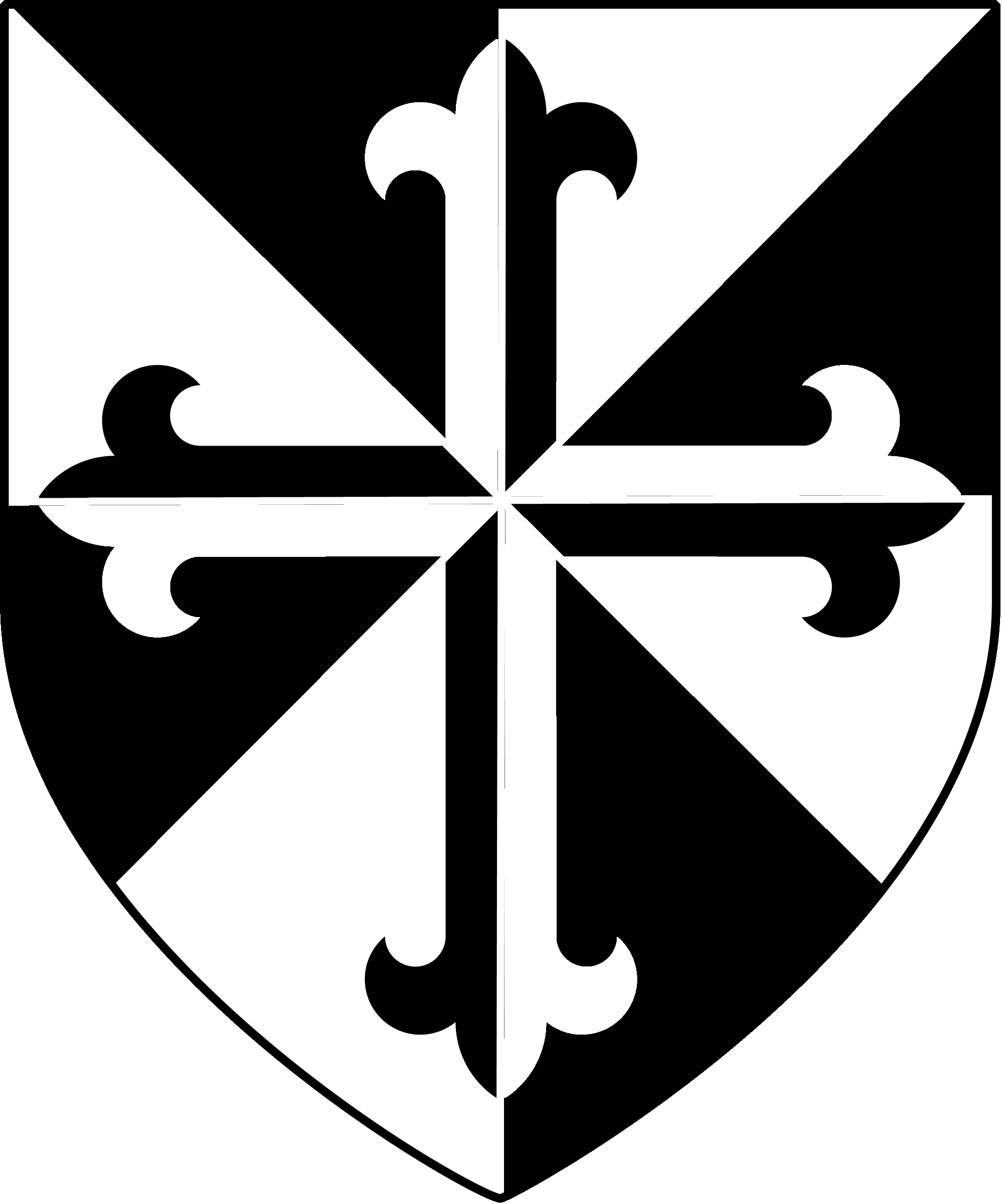
- Coat of Arms of the Dominican Order

- Location within Derbyshire

Monastery information
- Other names: Derby Dominican Priory; Blackfriars, Derby
- Order: Dominican Order
- Established: 1224-1238
- Disestablished: 1539
- Dedication: The Annunciation of Our Lady
- Diocese: Diocese of Lichfield

Site
- Location: Friar Gate, Derby, England
- Coordinates: 52°55′27.6″N 1°29′9.4″W
- Grid reference: SK 3480 3632
- Visible remains: Remains of the cellar thought to have been incorporated into the house known as "The Friary", and stonework from the priory used in foundations. A single medieval wall remains at the rear of this building.

Derby Dominican Priory, also known as Derby Black Friary, or Blackfriars, Derby, was a Dominican priory situated in the town of Derby, England. It was also named in different sources as a friary, monastery and convent, but was officially a priory as it was headed by a prior and the Dominican Order calls all their houses Priories. The "Black" came from the colour of the mantles worn by the friars of the order.

The priory was founded in the 13th century and enjoyed both royal patronage and royal visitors until its dissolution in 1539. It was constructed just outside the old town walls of Derby, on the site currently occupied by a house known as "The Friary" (formerly a hotel and currently a nightclub) on Friar Gate, just south of where Ford Street becomes Stafford Street. The priory was one of three in the immediate vicinity: a community of Benedictine nuns lived at The Priory of St Mary De Pratis (also known as King's Mead Priory), just under a quarter of a mile to the north-west; a community of Cluniac monks lived at St. James Priory (also known as Derby Cluniac Priory), just over a quarter of a mile to the south-east.

== History ==
=== Foundation ===
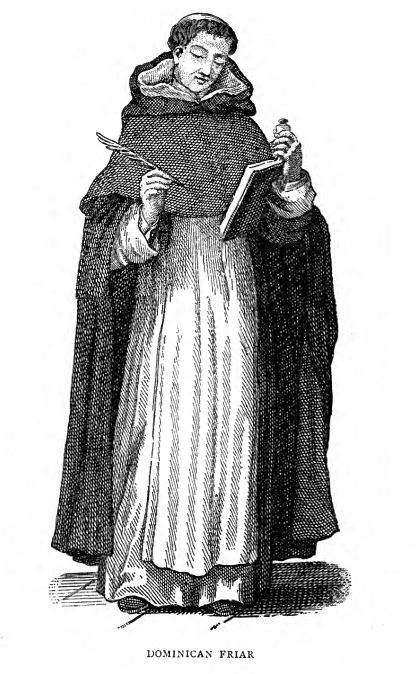
A representation of a Dominican Friar

The priory was founded during Alexander de Stavenby's reign as Bishop of Coventry and Lichfield between the years 1224 and 1238. It was constructed to the west of the town of Derby, just outside the town walls, in the parish of St. Werburgh, and dedicated to "The Annunciation of Our Lady".

The friars were known as "The Friar Preachers of Derby", as brethren of the Dominican Order believed in going out and preaching to the public, rather than cloistering and secluding themselves as other monastic orders did. Houses of the order were also forbidden from holding landed property, other than the sites upon which their priories were constructed; the priory did not, therefore, attract the same sizable landed donations as other monastic establishments in Derbyshire. Donations were, however, made towards enlarging the site the priory stood on, allowing it to expand to over 16 acres. An additional 3/4 of an acre of meadow land was added to the site c.1292.

=== 13th century ===
King Henry III is described as "a generous benefactor" to the priory. In 1229 Henry gave 20 marks to the priors "as a royal gift towards the building of their church." The king made additional donations of 10 marks in 1242 and of £10 in 1244, which probably also went towards construction. In 1291, the priory received £5 from the will of Queen Eleanor, wife of Henry III of England, who was "a great patroness of the Dominicans".

It is thought the church was constructed bay by bay over a period of many years, for when Edward I visited the Derbyshire village of Tideswell on 21 August 1277, he made a donation of 5 marks specifically for "subsidium ecclesie ibidem construende": to "help build a church there".

==== Frate Ruffolo ====
The Italian chronicles of the Dominican Order record the unusual death of one of the brethren Derby, on 27 May 1257. The friar, recorded as "Frate Ruffolo" was a young man who, whilst conducting business in the neighboring town of Nottingham, became seriously ill. He was taken in by the Franciscan friars at Nottingham Franciscan Friary. Having been given the holy sacraments, he closed his eyes and began to smile: saying his joy was because "the glorious King St. Edmund has entered his cell; and that the whole chamber is filled with angelic spirits", then claiming that the Virgin Mary "our great and blessed Lady", had come. Having then seen Jesus Christ come to judge him, Frate Ruffolo is then described as screaming in mortal agony, whilst breaking out in a powerful sweat and shaking from head to foot. Frate Ruffolo then began to speak, as if replying to questioning as part of his judgement: "It is true....O my Jesus, pardon that offence, for it was slight". The friars who were with Frate Ruffolo, witnessing his unseen judgement, questioned him: "Are we judged for such small offences?" "We must suffer the punishment for all", was his reply. His judgement appeared to have gone well, as Frate Ruffolo exclaimed "Assuredly, He (Jesus) is merciful, and I have tasted of His mercy", and with that he died.

=== 14th century ===
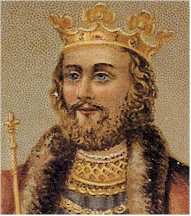
King Edward II

The Dominican Order held a provincial chapter at the priory in 1310; King Edward II gave £10 for two days food for the event. Further provincial chapters were held at the priory in 1346 and 1376, for which King Edward III gave £15 and £20 respectively.

King Edward II visited the area in 1323: staying in Nottingham from 9–24 November, and at the royal hunting lodge at Ravensdale, in the Forest of Duffield, from 24 November to 16 December. During this time he visited both Derby and the priory, making an order on 27 November 1323 for the payment of expenses the friars had incurred in receiving him. In January the following year, Edward visited Derby again, donating 8s. 8d. to the friars to provide a day's food for them. A day's food for a friar was calculated as 4d, which implies there were 26 friars living at the priory.

In 1344 the priory was victim of an "attack", when a large group of men broke into the priory and "cut down trees and carried off goods and chattles, to the alleged value of £60". Many of the friars and the friary's servants were beaten, injured and wounded in the attack. The prior obtained a writ which named 44 of the alleged perpetrators, who included "two chaplains, and various tradesmen of the town, such as linen-drapers, grocers, skinners, and shoemakers". Nothing is recorded in the assize rolls with regard to these perpetrators, showing there was probably some sort of "amicable termination" or out-of-court settlement.

The barns and outbuildings at the priory were used as a royal wool-store. In 1354, John de Bredon, one of the Derbyshire wool-collectors charged with the care of around 80 stone of wool at Derby Blackfriars, was convicted and imprisoned at Fleet Prison in London for allowing most of that wool to rot, whilst selling the remains for his own gain.

In 1374, while staying at the royal hunting lodge at Ravensdale, John of Gaunt, 1st Duke of Lancaster, donated the timber of three oaks to the priory.

=== 15th century ===
In July 1403, King Henry IV stayed two nights at Derby whilst traveling between Nottingham and Burton Upon Trent. He gave 2 marks to the priory "in recompense for the various damages done by the royal suite".

=== 16th century ===
Around 1534–1535, and with the threat of dissolution looming, many English Dominican Friars left for Ireland, Scotland and Flanders. The priory had an average of around 30 friars at any one time; however, following this threat, the numbers reduced to only 6.

On 3 January 1539, the priory was surrendered to the Crown for dissolution. At the time it was recorded as having an income, after expenses, of £18 16s 2d. Attached to the document of surrender is the old seal of the priori, used from the time of its foundation. In shape a pointed oval or mandorla, it displays a representation of the Annunciation, with the Virgin Mary and the Archangel Gabriel standing facing each other with the word "Domini" (as in Ecce Ancilla Domini"). Below them is displayed a trefoiled arch with the half-length figure of the Prior in prayer.

=== After dissolution ===
The friary and its land were immediately let to John Sharpe for a yearly rent of 54s. The following year he was awarded a 21-year lease with the condition that the building materials of all the superfluous buildings (which were to be demolished) and all of the trees at the friary, were reserved for the crown.

On 18 January 1544, the same John Sharpe took Richard Camerdaye (a labourer from Derby) to court, claiming he had broken into the former friary and stolen the marble gravestones and certain lead, iron, glass and timber, all valued as worth £4.

== Remains ==
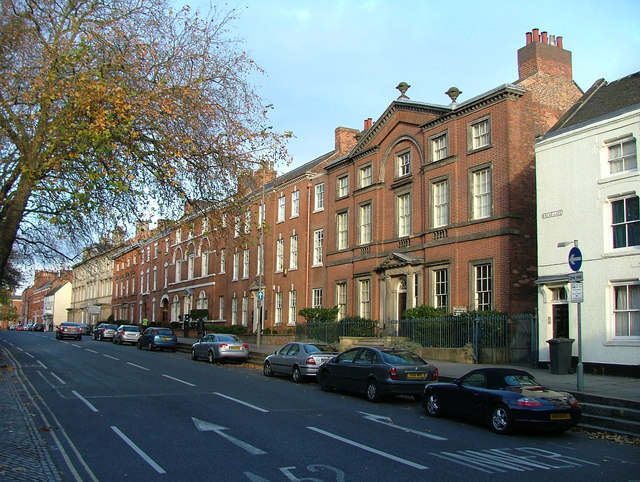
Georgian Townhouses in Friar Gate, Derby; including Pickford's House Museum

The priory was located on the street currently known as Friargate: the site was densely built over as the town of Derby grew beyond its medieval footprint. The street contains more buildings from the 1600s than any other street in Derbyshire. In the 1700s the street became a fashionable place for the wealthy to live and many large Georgian houses were built, including what is now the Pickford's House Museum. The street was also home to several schools, to Derby Gaol and later to Derby Friargate railway station.

The site of the priory is currently occupied by the Grade II listed building known as "The Friary"; built around 1730/1731 for Samuel Crompton, son of Abraham Crompton, founder of Derby's first bank. At the time of construction, a building, thought to have been part of the original priory, but which had been converted into three dwellings, still existed to the rear of the site of The Friary House, and stones from the original priory building were used in the foundations of the house. These remaining friary buildings were demolished in the early 19th century. The house was extended in 1770 and then further modified and extended in 1875, at which point it was owned by Henry Boden, whose widow sold it to the Whitaker family in 1922. To the annoyance of Mrs. Boden, the Whitakers converted the house into the Friary Hotel; it was converted again in 1996, this time into a pub; its current incarnation is as a nightclub.

Behind the house are the remains of a much older wall, thought to be part of the old priory. The cellars also incorporate the remains of a medieval building, thought to be part of the priory buildings (but not conclusively dated as such).

=== Artifacts ===
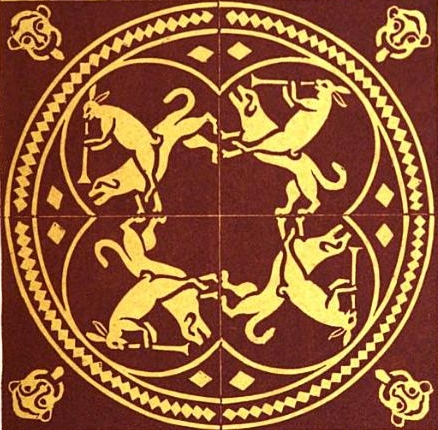
Medieval floor tiles found at the friary, showing a hare riding a dog

Human remains and floor tiles were found in the area around The Friary House, thought to come from the former friary burial ground.

== Hauntings ==
The area formerly occupied by the priory is believed by some to be haunted.
The building known as The Friary, built on the site of the priory buildings, is the location of several sightings of monks dressed in black (Dominican Friars wore black), including sightings of a headless monk. The Friary is also a stopping point on several local ghost walks, with the ghosts of monks most frequently reported in its cellars, which are thought to incorporate part of the original priory buildings.
