= Locko Preceptory =

Defunct Preceptory in Derbyshire, England

- Coat of Arms of the Order of Saint Lazarus

- Location within Derbyshire

Monastery information
- Other name: Domus de la Maudeleyne de Lokhay in com. Derb. Ordinis militie Sci. Lazari Jerusalem
- Order: Military and Hospitaller Order of Saint Lazarus of Jerusalem
- Established: Land gifted 1080; Preceptory constructed before 1266
- Disestablished: Ceased to operate after around 1453; Formally dissolved in the 1540s
- Dedication: Mary Magdalene
- Controlled churches: Spondon

Site
- Location: Just over a mile North of Spondon, Derbyshire, England, United Kingdom
- Coordinates: 52.9395°N 1.3925°W
- Visible remains: None
- Public access: Site part of Locko Park: Private Property

Locko Preceptory was a Preceptory (with an attached leper hospital) of the Military and Hospitaller Order of Saint Lazarus of Jerusalem, situated just over a mile north of Spondon, Derbyshire; the site is today part of the Locko Park estate. It is the only recorded Lazarite Preceptory in England.

== History ==
=== Early history: 11th and 12th centuries ===
In 1080, William de Ferrers, 3rd Earl of Derby granted the church of Spondon to the Leper Hospital and Brethren of St. Lazarus, at Burton Lazars in Leicestershire; This grant was later confirmed by both King Henry II and by King John.

Before the end of the reign of King Henry III (1216–1272), the Hospital and Brethren acquired a great deal of land in both Spondon and the surrounding hamlets of Borrowash, Chaddesden and Locko. The Hundred Rolls of 1274 value the land at Spondon at £10, land at Borrowash at 100s., and reveal the hospital owned 40 acres of land at Locko. By 1291, the brethren of the hospital held the manors at Spondon and Locko, which were given a joint value of £5 6s. 10d., in the Taxation Roll of that year. These estates included land and a windmill and the manors came with responsibility of operating the local court. The Taxatio Ecclesiastica of 1291–92 gave the preceptory an annual "real income" of around £77 7s., around a third of which would have been expected to have been given in tribute to the Order's mother-house and Grand Master who, at this time, resided in France.

The Preceptory was constructed at some-point between 1080 and 1266, but the exact point of construction is unclear.

Following the capture of Robert de Ferrers, 6th Earl of Derby in 1266, following his rebellion against King Henry III, de Ferrers' lands and estates were confiscated; the associated from 1266 documents reveal there was a preceptory and leper hospital of the Order of St Lazarus at Locko, dedicated to St Mary Magdalene. The name itself, "Locko", is derived from the French Loques, signifying "rags" (bandages), which were used in the hospital on the site.

=== 14th century ===
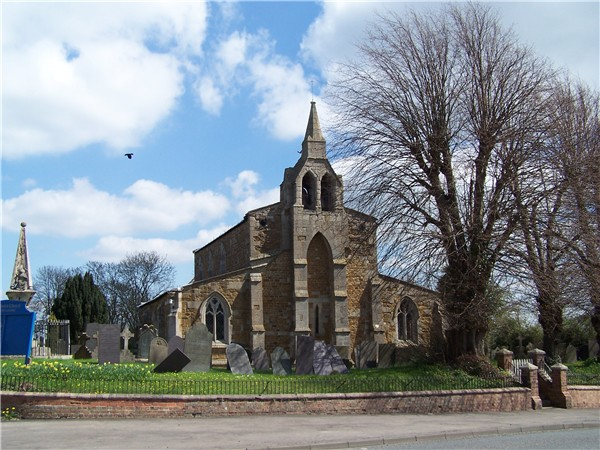
Burton Lazars Church

In 1340, the hospital and much of the Locko estate (along with much of the local area) were destroyed by the Great Spondon Fire of 1340.

The Preceptory owed direct allegiance to the mother-house of the Order of St Lazarus which by the 14th century was in France; this caused problems as the preceptuary was regarded as an "alien establishment" during England's wars with France, and their income was forfeited to the crown due to the conflict. This came at a time when the French elite of the order began to take greater interest in the order's lucrative estates in England, and when the English brethren were questioning their allegiance to the French mother-house. One such of the English Brethren was "Hugh Michel" who was Master at Burton Lazars; his colleagues however remained loyal to the mother-house and so Michel retired to Locko Preceptory where he was granted a house for life in return for the priory paying £20 a year to the mother-house in France. This was not to be the end of the matter as on 30 July 1347, King Edward III issued Letters Patent stating that Lock Preceptory (referred to as: "Domus de la Maudeleyne de Lokhay in com. Derb. Ordinis militie Sci. Lazari Jerusalem.") was to pay £20 a year (the sum they had previously paid in tribute to their mother-house in France) to the "warden and scholars" at the newly founded King's Hall, Cambridge. Michel was officially deposed as Master of Burton Lazars in October 1347, but this payment continued until 1352, ending following Michel's death.

Michel's aim for independence from French control did partially come true, as his successor, Thomas de Kirkeby, has to ask permission of King Edward III to travel to inspect the Order's English properties; this permission was usually granted by the French mother-house, suggesting authority had passed to the English King.

=== Decline: 15th and 16th centuries ===
At the end of the Hundred Years' War the Lazarite property was probably transferred to the brethren at Burton Lazars; the chief leper house of the order in England.

Locko thereby ceased to exist as a preceptory (although appears to have continued operating as a leper hospital).

Locko is known to have been tenanted to lay-people long before the Reformation. Following dissolution by King Henry VIII, Locko was granted to John Dudley. At the time, the order's property at Locko were valued at £7 5s.; property at Spondon were valued at £14 9s. 4.d; at Borrowash £4 9s. 4d., and at Chaddesden 11s. 3d.

The site is currently occupied by Locko Park, an 18th-century country house.

== Architectural history ==
Like many Lazarite hospitals, it was constructed near to a crossroads. The site was moated and came with associated outbuildings, fishponds, and a spring (known as St Ann's Well).

Little is known about the actual preceptory and hospital buildings, or what they looked like; although it is known that they were destroyed by The Great Fire of Spondon of 1340.

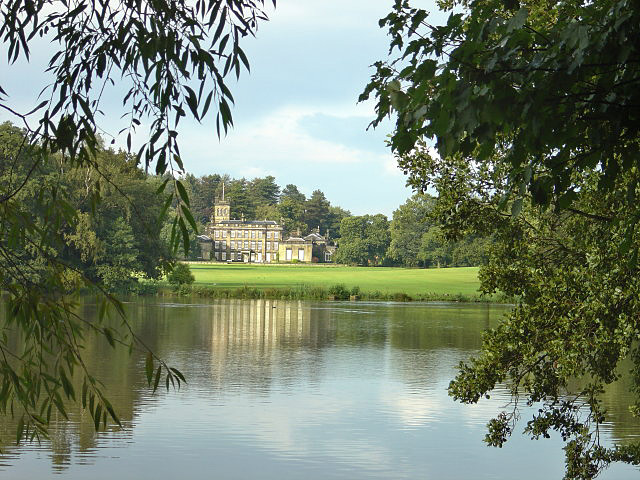
Locko Park

The site is today part of the Locko Park estate. The preceptory sat to the rear of the current Hall.

== See also ==
- Burton Lazars
- Locko Park
- Order of St Lazarus
- Spondon
