= Listed buildings in Dale Abbey =

Dale Abbey is a civil parish in the Erewash district of Derbyshire, England. The parish contains 20 listed buildings that are recorded in the National Heritage List for England. Of these, three are listed at Grade I, the highest of the three grades, one is at Grade II*, the middle grade, and the others are at Grade II, the lowest grade. The parish contains the village of Dale Abbey and the surrounding area. The village gets its name from the abbey of the same name, which is in ruins. The abbey ruins are listed, together with buildings in the village, including houses, farmhouses and farm buildings, and a church with an attached house. To the north of the village is a post mill, which is listed together with two associated buildings. To the west of the village is Locko Park, a country house, which is listed together with associated structures and items in its grounds.

== Key ==
Grade	Criteria
I	Buildings of exceptional interest, sometimes considered to be internationally important
II*	Particularly important buildings of more than special interest
II	Buildings of national importance and special interest

== Buildings ==
Name and location	Photograph	Date	Notes	Grade
All Saints Church and Vergers Farmhouse; 52.94288°N 1.35068°W		Late 12th century	The church has been altered through the centuries and a farmhouse added to the west. The church is in gritstone with a tile roof, it is small, and consists of a nave, a south aisle, and a chancel. On the west gable is a small bellcote. There are two bays, and in the left bay is a two-light Perpendicular window. The right bay has two storeys and a rendered gable, and it contains a round-headed doorway and a two-light casement window above. The house to the right has two storeys and two bays, the right bay recessed. The upper storey is jettied and has applied timber framing. In the ground floor of the left bay is a casement window, and above is a gabled half-dormer. On the south side is an external staircase.	I
Ruins of Dale Abbey; 52.94428°N 1.35013°W		Late 13th century	The main surviving part of the abbey is the great arch of the chancel east window, that has a moulded surround and traces of geometrical tracery. The other remains include part of the northwest return wall with part of the jamb of an arch, and parts of the footings of the walls of the chancel and transepts.	I
Abbey House and Manor House; 52.94384°N 1.35102°W		Medieval	A pair of cottages added to remains of the abbey in the 19th century. The building is in gritstone and red brick, and has a tile roof and two storeys. The abbey remains are on the corner, and consist of a massive stack with four chamfered string courses. On the south front is a gabled bay on the left, a doorway with a stone lintel to the right, and casement windows, the window in the upper floor of the right bay in a gabled dormer. In the east front are casement windows, the window in the ground floor with a segmental arch.	II
Outbuilding to west of former Methodist Chapel; 52.94465°N 1.35225°W		Medieval	Possibly the gatehouse to Dale Abbey, it has been altered and used for other purposes. It is in gritstone and red brick, and has a tile roof. There are two storeys and buttresses, and it contains a doorway, a casement window, and a loft doorway.	II
Friars House; 52.94422°N 1.35220°W		15th century	The house was later extended, and has a tile roof. The earlier part has two storeys, the upper storey jettied, and two bays. In the ground floor is timber framing with close studding, and the upper floor is in red brick. It contains a doorway and casement windows. The later part has two storeys and an attic, and two bays. The ground floor is in gritstone, and the upper part is in brick. It has bands, and a dentilled cornice, and contains casement windows and a small attic window.	II
Locko Park; 52.94378°N 1.39174°W		1699	The oldest part is a chapel from a former religious institution, the country house was added in the 18th century, and it was extended in the 19th century. The house is in rendered brick and stone, with solid and balustraded parapets and a hipped Welsh slate roof. There are four ranges around a courtyard, with one, two and three storeys. The south range has three storeys and nine bays, flanked by single-storey projecting wings. On the front are giant rusticated pilasters, a moulded plinth, a moulded eaves cornice, and a balustraded parapet with urns. In the centre is a Tuscan porch, and a doorway with a moulded surround, and the windows are sashes with moulded architraves and keystones. On the west side is an Italianate bell tower, and to its left is an Italianate porch with sculptures of birds.	II*
Boyah Grange; 52.93824°N 1.34129°W	—	Early 18th century	A farmhouse in painted brick on a stone plinth, with dentilled floor bands and a tile roof. There are two storeys and attics, and a T-shaped plan, with a front of three bays. The doorway has a flat head, and the windows are casements. Inside there is an inglenook fireplace.	II
Abbey Farmhouse; 52.94492°N 1.35124°W		18th century	The farmhouse is in red brick and sandstone on a chamfered stone plinth, with a dentilled eaves cornice, and a tile roof. There are two storeys and attics, and three bays. In the centre is a doorway with a rectangular fanlight, and the windows are sashes, all with wedge brick lintels.	II
Garden walls, terraces, glasshouses and fernery, Locko Park; 52.94483°N 1.39225°W	—	18th century (probable)	The garden walls are in brick, with stone and terracotta dressings, and they enclose a square area with sides of about 150 metres (490 ft). The south wall has niches, piers with urns, and a central gateway flanked by piers with dentilled caps and lead winged lions. At the northeast end is a terrace and a glasshouse range. The terrace retaining wall has intermediate piers, and in the centre is a flight of steps with balustraded walls. In the centre of the glasshouse range is a conservatory in wood with cast iron columns, flanked by lean-tos. At the rear is a heated wall, and to the west is a fernery.	II
Thatched Barn; 52.94377°N 1.35304°W		18th century (probable)	The barn has a plinth of gritstone and red brick, it is weatherboarded above, and has a reed thatched roof. The barn has a single storey and an almost square plan, and contains a doorway on the north side.	II
Lodges, Locko Park; 52.93698°N 1.40242°W		Late 18th century	The lodges flanking the entrance to the drive are in stone with hipped Welsh slate roofs. They have a single storey and a square plan, and rear wings. Each lodge has an impost band, a moulded cornice, and a blocking course. On the front facing the drive is a projecting pedimented bay with a round arch containing a round-arched doorway with a fanlight, and on the sides are round arches containing round-arched sash windows. Between the lodges are wrought iron gates, consisting of two pedestrian gates, square openwork gate piers with latticework sides and pyramidal tops, and a pair of main gates.	II
Cat and Fiddle Mill; 52.95362°N 1.34962°W		1788	The windmill is of the post mill type, and its circular gritstone base was added in 1884. There are two doorways, and the superstructure is weatherboarded with a gabled top, projecting on one side. The mill has four wooden sails, and inside it is a massive crown tree. In the upper part are the wire machine, millstones, a wind shaft, and the brake and the drive wheels.	I
Miller's house, Cat and Fiddle Mill; 52.95350°N 1.34935°W		Early 19th century	The house, which has been largely rebuilt, is in red brick with a tile roof, two storeys and two bays. In the centre is a doorway, and the windows are casements with two lights, those in the ground floor with segmental heads.	II
Ice house, Locko Park; 52.94314°N 1.38830°W		Early 19th century	The ice house has been converted into a folly in Gothic style. It is in red brick, and has a canted front. In the centre is a doorway, and the outer faces each contains an alcove with a pointed head and a hood mould. At the top is an embattled parapet rising to a central gable. Inside, there is a short passage leading to a circular domed chamber that has been filled in.	II
Bridge over weir, Locko Park; 52.93713°N 1.39812°W		Mid 19th century	The bridge crossing the weir is in gritstone and brick. It consists of a single rusticated segmental arch flanked by a band of quoins. Above the arch is a plain band and a parapet wall with plain copings, ramped up at the ends to meet square rusticated piers with pyramidal tops and ball finials.	II
Gate and gate piers, Locko Park; 52.94333°N 1.39144°W		1850s (probable)	The gates at the outer entrance to the carriage sweep are in wrought iron with openwork iron piers. The flanking stone gate piers are square, with panelled sides, moulded tops on dentils, and urn finials, and outside them are low abutment walls.	II
Ha-ha, walls, gates, clock tower, sculptures and terracing, Locko Park; 52.94346°N 1.39255°W		1850s	The ha-ha encloses three sides of a formal garden to the south of the house, and is in gritstone. In the south wall is an Italianate gateway with urns, curving walls, and female sculptures holding globe lamps. The southeast corner has a pier with a sculpture of two fighting lions, and at the southwest corner is a sculpture of a lion with its prey. In the centre of the west wall is an Italianate clock tower with a clock face, round-arched bell openings, a fluted frieze, a moulded cornice, and ball finials. Elsewhere, there are sculptures of students, an eagle, lions, and urns.	II
West Lodge, Locko Park; 52.94437°N 1.39043°W		c. 1860	The lodge is in stone with a Welsh slate roof, and is in Italianate style. There is a single storey, with two bays along the sides. The front is pedimented, and steps lead up to a central recessed doorway with a moulded surround. This is flanked by Tuscan pilasters, above it is an entablature, and in the pediment is a small arched window with impost blocks and a keystone. On the south front are sash windows in moulded architraves.	II
Stable block, Locko Park; 52.94412°N 1.39107°W		Mid to late 19th century	The stable block is in red and yellow brick with gritstone dressings and hipped Welsh slate roofs. There are three ranges forming a U-shaped plan round a courtyard, and a further wing on the west. The courtyard is enclosed by a wall containing a round archway with ball finials and the sculpture of a hen. The west range has segmental arches, in the north range are doorways with quoined jambs, sash and mullioned windows, and the east range has a carriage entrance, over which is a bell turret with a concave pyramidal top.	II
Outbuildings to north of Cat and Fiddle Mill; 52.95384°N 1.34966°W	—	Late 19th century	The outbuildings consist of stables in brick with a Welsh slate roof and one storey. They contain two stable-type doors and two windows.	II
