= List of monastic houses in South Yorkshire =

Locations of monastic houses in South Yorkshire
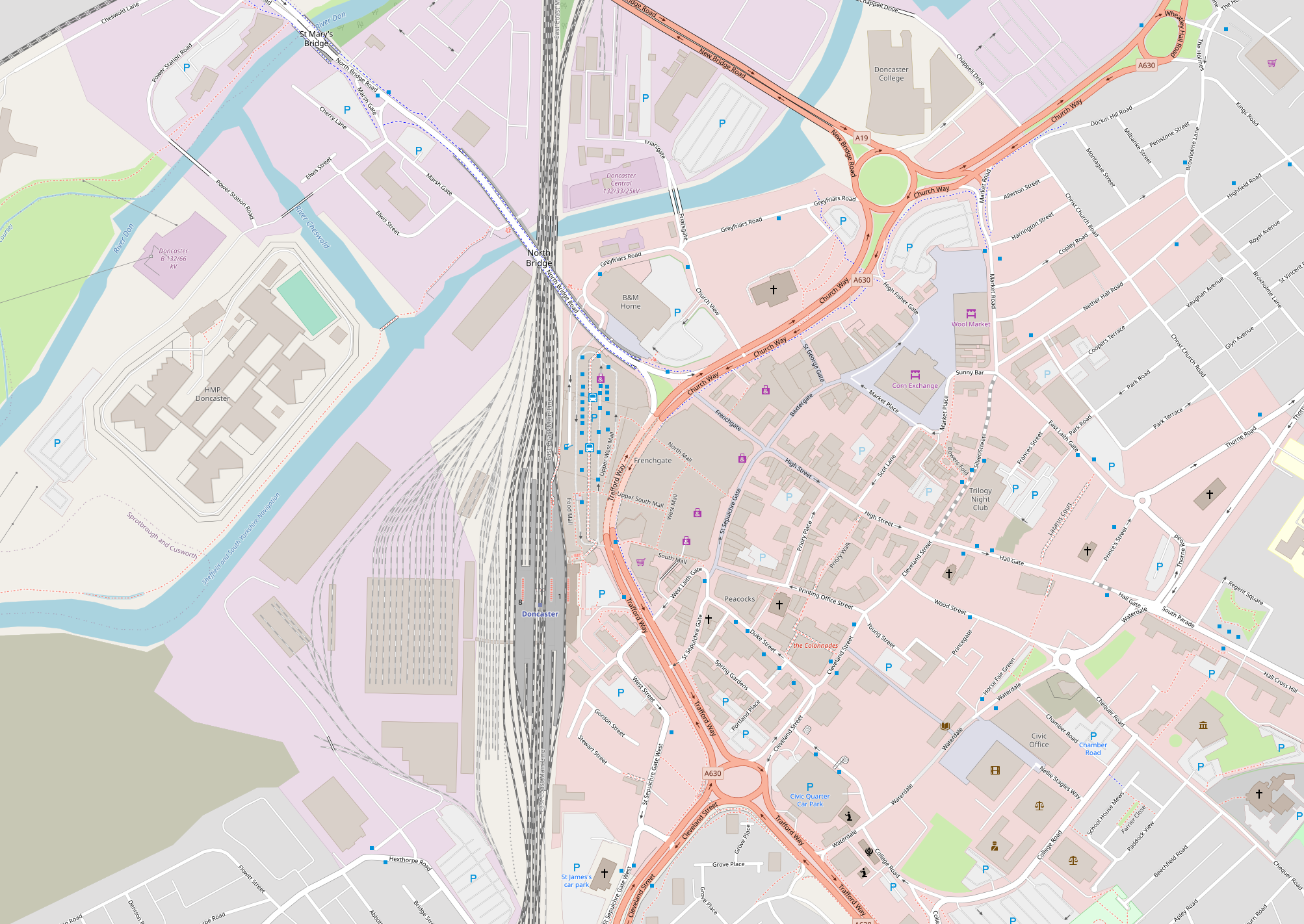
Locations of monastic houses in Doncaster

The following is a list of the monastic houses in South Yorkshire, England.

Alien houses are included, as are smaller establishments such as cells and notable monastic granges (particularly those with resident monks), and also camerae of the military orders of monks (Knights Templar and Knights Hospitaller). Monastic hospitals are included where they had the status or function of an abbey, priory, or preceptor/commandery.

Abbreviations and key

Status of remains
Symbol	Status
None	Ruins
*	Current monastic function
^{+}	Current non-monastic ecclesiastic function (including remains incorporated into later structure)
^	Current non-ecclesiastic function (including remains incorporated into later structure) or redundant intact structure
^{$}	Remains limited to earthworks etc.
^{#}	No identifiable trace of the monastic foundation remains
^{~}	Exact site of monastic foundation unknown
^{≈}	Identification ambiguous or confused

Locations with names in italics indicate possible duplication (misidentification with another location) or non-existent foundations (either erroneous reference or proposed foundation never implemented) or ecclesiastical establishments with a monastic name but lacking actual monastic connection.

Trusteeship
EH	English Heritage
LT	Landmark Trust
NT	National Trust

Foundation	Image	Communities & provenance	Formal name or dedication & alternative names	References & location
Beauchief Abbey ^{+}		Premonstratensian canons — from Welbeck, (Nottinghamshire) daughter house of Welbeck; founded 1173-6 (1183) by Robert fitz Ranulph, Lord Alfreton, Albinus, Abbot of Darley, witnessed foundation charter; dissolved 4 February 1537; granted to Sir Nicholas Strelly 1537; remains incorporated into present parish church, restored 19th century	The Abbey Church of the Blessed Virgin Mary and Saint Thomas of Canterbury, Beauchief ____________________; Beauchief Priory; De Bello Capite Abbey	53°20′00″N 1°30′03″W
Doncaster Greyfriars ^{#}		Franciscan Friars Minor, Conventual (under the Custody of York) founded before 1284; dissolved 20 November 1538		53°31′35″N 1°08′20″W
Doncaster Whitefriars ^{#}		Carmelite Friars founded 1351, land granted by three people — John of Gaunt later regarded as a founder; dissolved 13 November 1538		53°31′23″N 1°08′05″W
Dunscroft Grange		Cistercian monks probably residential grange dependent on Roche founded after 1186; dissolved with Roche? (25 June 1538)		53°34′54″N 1°00′44″W
Ecclesfield Priory ^		Benedictine monks alien house: cell dependent on St-Wandrille; church granted by Richard de Lovetot; dissolved 1356; granted to the Carthusians of Coventry, Warwickshire (West Midlands); remains incorporated into house built on site 1736		53°26′38″N 1°28′14″W
Hampole Priory		possibly Benedictine nuns founded before 1156 by William de Clarefai and his wife Avicia de Tany; with regular priests or brethren from 12th century to after 1308; Cistercian nuns by 13th century; dissolved 1539	The Priory Church of Saint Mary, Hampole	53°35′16″N 1°14′15″W
Monk Bretton Priory		Cluniac monks dependent on Pontefract (West Yorkshire); founded 1153-5 by Adam fitz Suan (Swain); Benedictine monks independent from c.1279; refounded 1279–81; struck off Cluniac list 1291; dissolved 21 November 1539; granted to William Blithman 1540/1; (EH)	The Priory Church of Saint Mary Magdalene of Lund	53°33′15″N 1°26′17″W
Roche Abbey		Cistercian monks daughter house of Newminster, Northumberland; founded 30 July 1147 by Richard de Builli and Richard fitz Turgis; dissolved 23 June 1538; granted to William Ramesden and Thomas Vavasor 1546/7; remains incorporated into the grounds of Sandbeck Hall and landscaped by Capability Brown 1774, who demolished much of the claustral buildings; (EH)	The Abbey Church of Saint Mary, Roche ____________________; Roch Abbey	53°24′09″N 1°11′00″W
Tickhill Austin Friars ^		Augustinian Friars (under the Limit of York) founded c.1260 (c.1256?) by John Clarell, (?)Dean of St Paul's or Prebendary of Southwell and rector of East Brigford; dissolved 19 November 1538, surrendered to Sir George Lawson and commissioners; remains incorporated into houses called 'The Friars' built on site c.1663		53°25′42″N 1°07′10″W
Tickhill Cell(?)		Cluniac monks possible cell dependent on Lenton, Nottinghamshire — (evidence lacking) founded before c.1415; dissolved after 1504		
Tickhill Trinitarians? ^{≈}		Trinitarians reference to Trinitarians (Note: Tickhill Trinitarians Leland, Itinerary, ii, p. 112) probably indicates Austin Friary		

== See also ==
- List of monastic houses in England
