= Dale Abbey =

Village in Derbyshire, England

Coordinates: 52.945°N 1.352°W

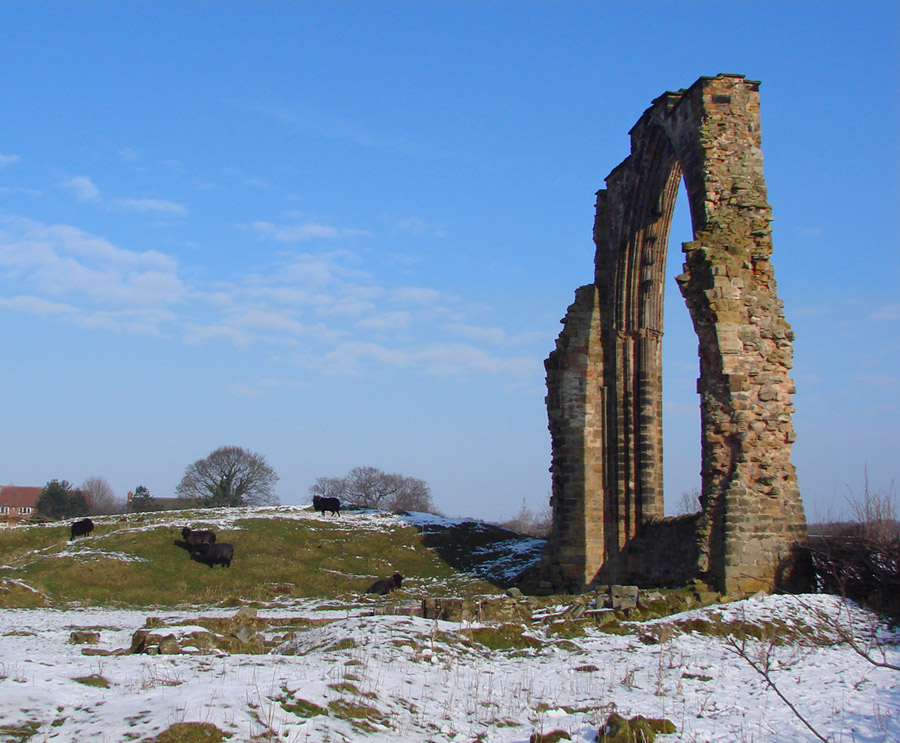
- The ruins of the Abbey

- Location within Derbyshire
- Population: 1,351 (2011)
- OS grid reference: SK 436 388
- District: Erewash
- Shire county: Derbyshire
- Region: East Midlands
- Country: England
- Sovereign state: United Kingdom
- Post town: ILKESTON
- Postcode district: DE7
- Police: Derbyshire
- Fire: Derbyshire
- Ambulance: East Midlands
- UK Parliament: Mid Derbyshire

Dale Abbey is a village and civil parish in the borough of Erewash in Derbyshire in the East Midlands of England, 6 miles north east of Derby. The population of the civil parish on the 2011 census was 1,351. Formerly known as Depedale or Deepdale, the village contains the remains of an abbey founded in the 12th or 13th century.

The north-west corner of the village is separately named as Dale, while the north-east corner is separately named as Dale Moor.

== The Abbey ==
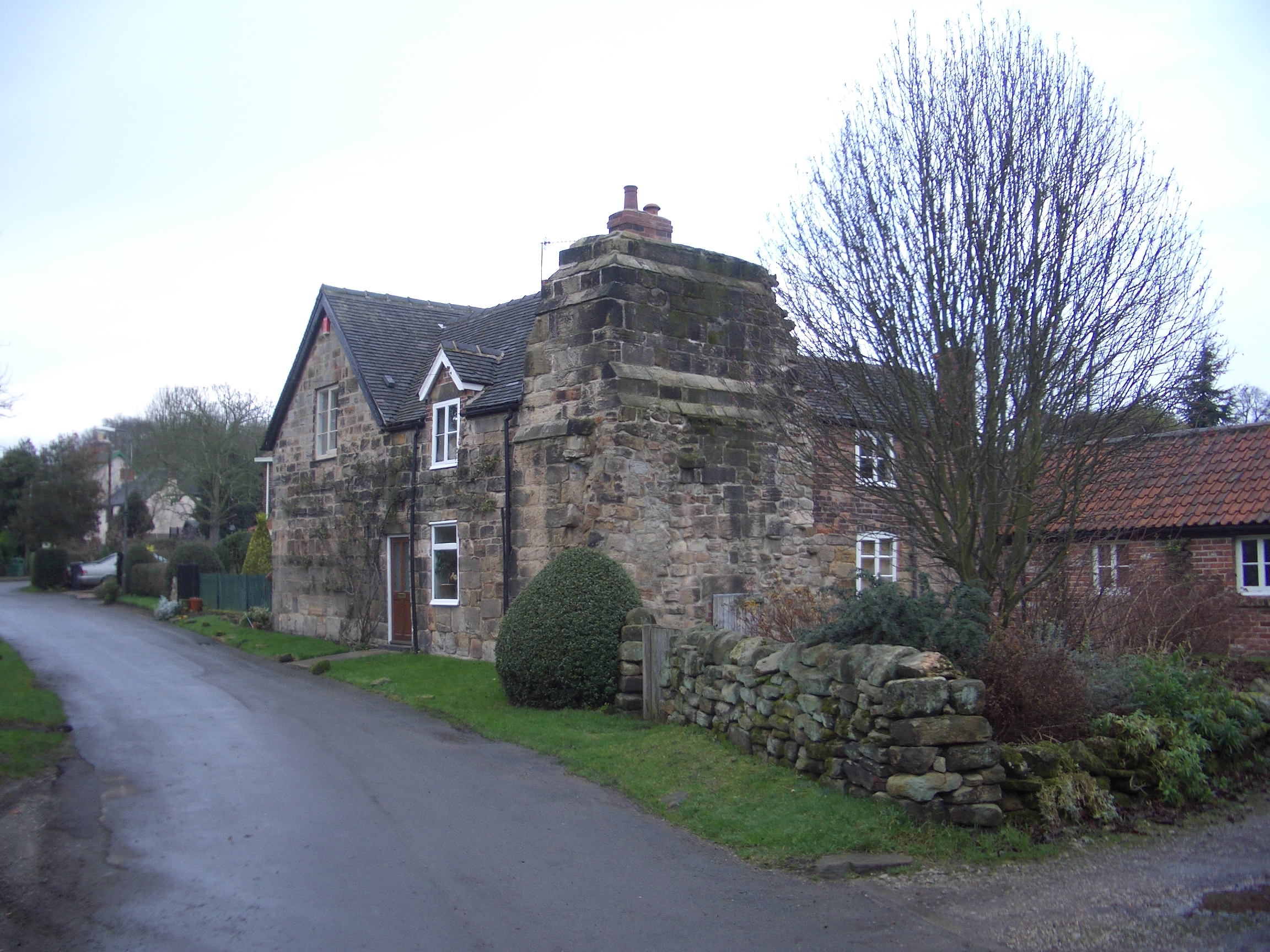
Remains of Dale Abbey as part of a house in the village

The Augustinian canons moved to Dale Abbey in 1162 from their previous home at Calke Abbey. A few years later they were replaced by Premonstratensian canons from Tupholme and finally, a few years after this, by another group of Premonstratensians from Welbeck. All these attempts failed, primarily due to the isolation of the area and the lack of good arable land amidst the thick woodlands. From around the year 1199, the Abbey became well established enough—and with the acquisition of further lands, tithes and other properties—to survive for the next 340 years. Although a relatively large establishment, the abbey was home to no more than 24 canons. The Abbey provided priests at Ilkeston, Heanor, Kirk Hallam and Stanton by Dale. The Abbey owned around 24,000 acres (97 km^{2}) of land. Much would have been leased or rented out or used for grazing or for the production of produce for the residents of the Abbey.

In 1539, the Act of Dissolution brought an end to almost four centuries of monastic life in the Dale. The remains comprise a 40-foot-high chancel window. Excavations have shown the church to have possessed transepts 100 feet in length, a crossing tower, a cloister 85 feet square and a nave of unknown length. Some of the remains of the building can be found in houses around the village. The last Abbot of Dale Abbey, John Bebe, died in 1540.

Sir Francis Pole of Radbourne took possession of Dale Abbey. The furnishings and fittings were either gradually sold off or stripped out and installed in other churches. Morley Church became home to some of the stained and painted glass, floor tiles and an entire porchway. The ornately carved font cover was installed in St Andrew's Church, Radbourne, while Chaddesden received a window frame. The font eventually found its way back to All Saints' Church, Dale Abbey in 1884, and the slabs upon which the canons walked for so many centuries can be found in the grounds of the church at the Moravian Settlement at Ockbrook.

Dale Abbey is recorded as the site of the "Wedding of Allan-A-Dale", the third of the stories of Robin Hood.

It is thought that the tenor bell of Derby Cathedral originally belonged to Dale Abbey, and was sold at the Dissolution of the Monasteries.

== The village ==
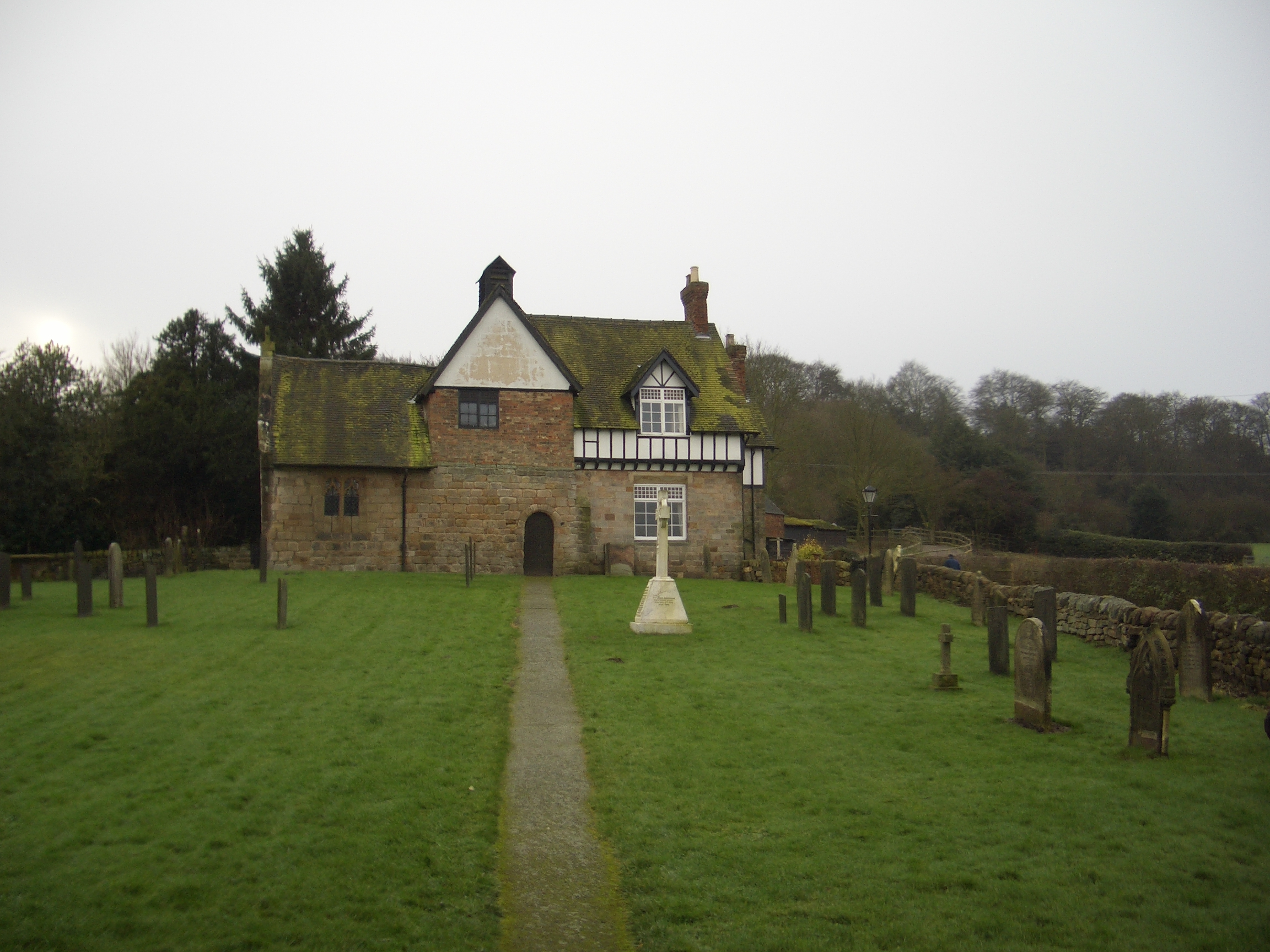
Church of All Saints, Dale Abbey

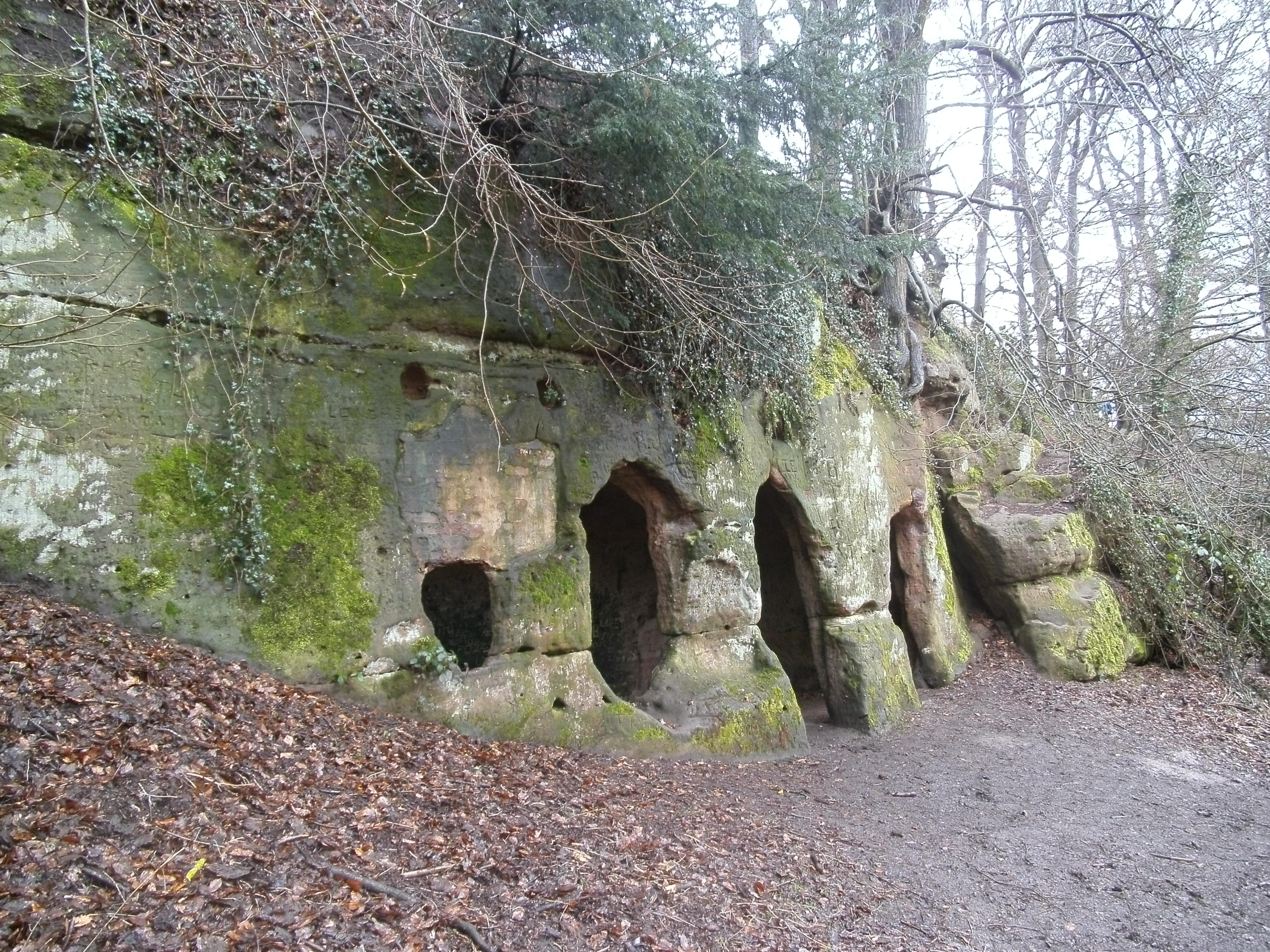
Hermit Cave

The Church of All Saints, at just 26 by 25 feet, is probably one of the smallest in the country. It shares a roof with an adjoining farmhouse. Dating from the mid-12th century, it was altered in 1480. It contains a pulpit from 1634. The adjoining farmhouse may have been used as an infirmary for the Abbey. For some time before 1820 it was used as a pub called the Blue Bell, the bar being used as a vestry, with a door into the aisle. It was rebuilt in 1883. "...it is said the village inn was anciently under the same roof, and there was a door in the wall leading from the gallery into the house, through which the worshippers were accustomed to steal to refresh themselves." Furthermore, "The clergyman used to dress in the bar of the Blue Bell inn and enter the church through a now-blocked door."

Behind the church is an area of woodland. In the wood is Hermit Cave, hewn out of the sandstone cliff by a 12th-century Derby baker who wished to live a life as a recluse. It is well preserved, measuring 6 yards by 3 with a doorway, two windows, a peephole and a niche for a light.

The Carpenters' Arms opened in 1880 and the Methodist Chapel opened in 1902.

== The mill ==
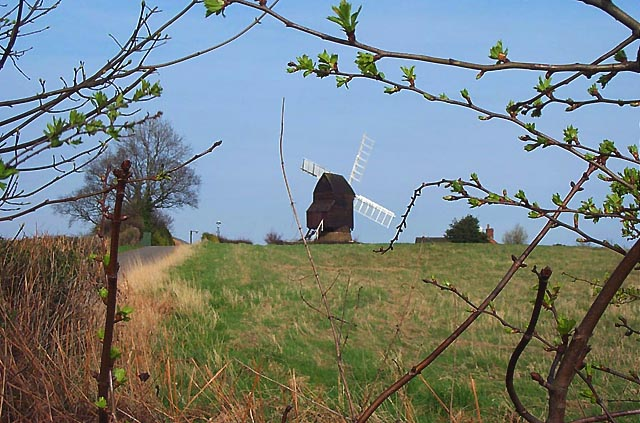
Cat and Fiddle Mill

The Cat and Fiddle Mill is a post mill situated close to the village (SK 438 398). It has a small round house and covered platform at the top of the ladder.

== Blue Bell Inn and the Methodist society of Dale Abbey ==
The Blue Bell Inn was part of the old oratory, which is now the church and farmhouse at Dale Abbey. Before relocating to the Carpenter's Arms, the old Blue Bell Inn was the source of religious discord among the villagers of Dale Abbey. Rev Joseph Thorpe Milner wrote in his Memoirs of the rev. Joseph Hollingworth, "that there was a door in the wall, leading from the gallery into the house, through which, in ancient times worshippers were accustomed to steal to refresh themselves." Milner suggests that the ancient villagers of Dale Abbey became divided on matters of religion. Many in the village prescribed to the instructions found in the King's Book of Sports, published in 1618. The Book of Sports suggested that following the Sunday service that peoples of England should "indulge in such recreations as dancing, archery, morrice dances, may-poles and other such amusements."

For many others in the village, they were influenced by the purist religious teachings of Rev. John Hieron M.A., the Rector from Breadsall in 1644. The Rector of Breadsall had established a monthly lecture at Dale Abbey until his ejection from the Established Church for non-conformity. From this time on there was a strong devotion by the villagers of Dale Abbey to the Christian Faith.

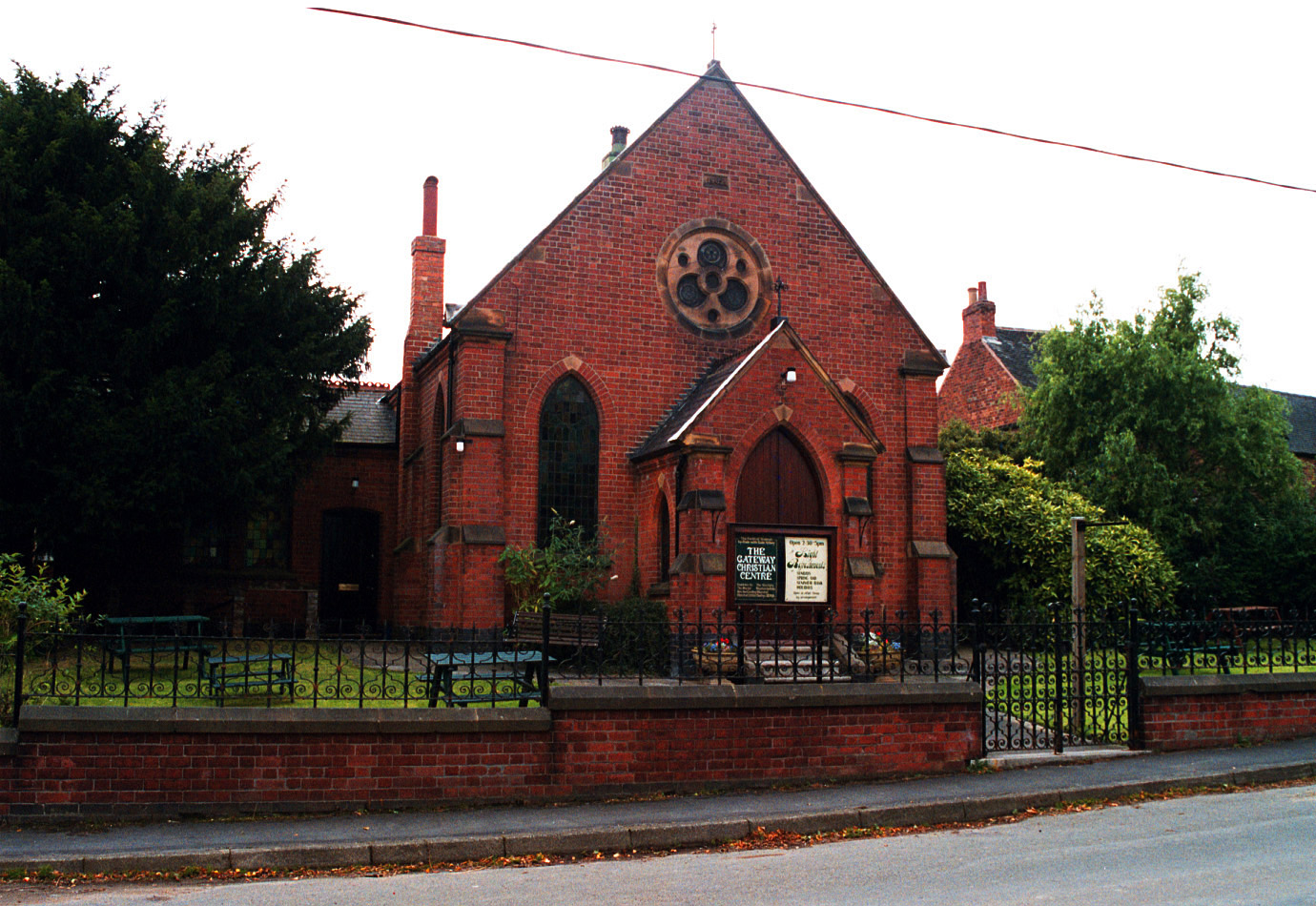
Methodist chapel nearly destroyed in 1844, and rebuilt 1904

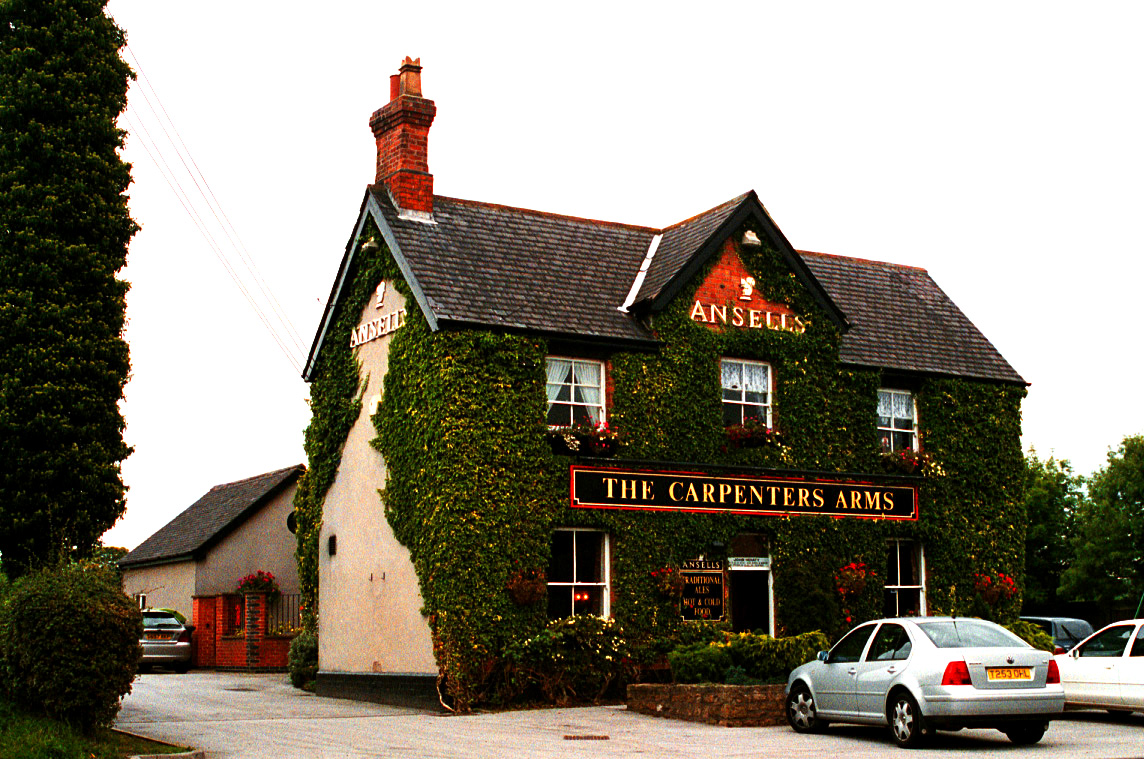
The Carpenters Arms Inn built by the Hollingworths

The old Dale family of Hollingworth had been the publicans of the Blue Bell Inn and later established the Carpenters Arms. In 1771, the first of John Wesley's ministry, Mr. S. Bardsley began calling upon Dale Abbey and the Hollingworth family. Soon afterwards a society of Methodists was formed. Rev J. Taylor of the Methodist movement made comment that Mr. (William) Hollingworth became one of the first members of the Methodist Society to form in Dale Abbey in 1786. Mr. Hollingworth's grandson Rev. Joseph Hollingworth was to later become one of the more notable Methodist ministers to circuit the Midlands between 1802 and 1836. Before the construction of the Methodists' chapel at Dale Abbey, an attentive congregation used to attend the barn of Mr. Joseph Hollingworth senior of Dale. The Hollingworth family of Dale originally came from the neighbouring village of Breadsall where they were publicans of the Old Hall Inn. This family are a junior scion of the Hollingworths of Hollingworth Hall in Cheshire, who descend directly from 1240 to this time. Rev. Peter Hollingworth AC, OBE, Archbishop of Brisbane and the 23rd Governor-General of Australia, is a direct descendant of the Hollingworths of Dale Abbey.

== See also ==
- Listed buildings in Dale Abbey
