= Locko Park =

Country house in Derbyshire, England

Locko Hall
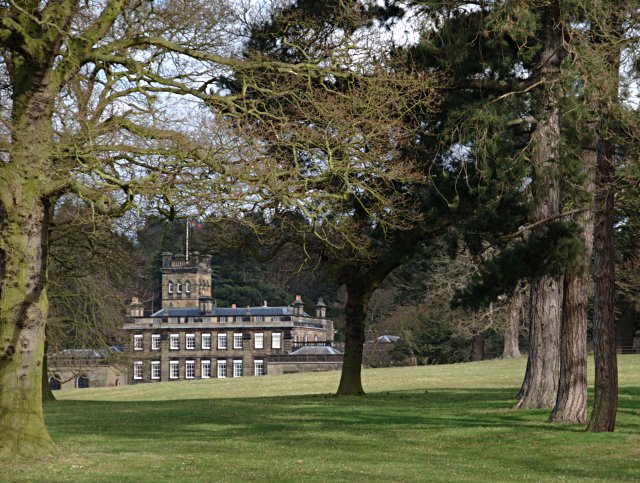
- Facade

- Location within Derbyshire

General information
- Location: Just over 1 mile north of Spondon, Derbyshire, England, United Kingdom., Derby, England
- Coordinates: 52.9395°N 1.3925°W
- Ordnance Survey: SK4096738648
- Construction started: c. 1725
- Client: Robert Ferne
- Owner: Drury-Lowe family

Design and construction
- Architect: Francis Smith of Warwick

Locko Park is a privately owned 18th-century country house in between the villages of Stanley and Ockbrook in the borough of Erewash, near Spondon, Derbyshire, England. It is a Grade II* listed building, and the park is Grade II listed in Historic England's Register of Parks and Gardens.

== History ==
The estate was acquired by William Gilbert from William Byrde in 1563. The oldest part of the house is the chapel of 1669. The main south facing block of the present house, built about 1725 out of locally sourced Keuper sandstone for the member of parliament, Robert Ferne, has three storeys and nine bays and a substantial Tuscan porch. The architect is believed to have been Francis Smith of Warwick. The current house was built on or close to the site of a hospital of the Order of St Lazarus of Jerusalem, which was in existence at least as far back as 1296. The order was dedicated to the care of lepers, and the name Locko derives from the old French word for rags, loques, in reference to the strips of lint that were applied to sores.

John Lowe purchased the estate in 1747 from the last descendant of the Gilbert family. In 1790 the property was bequeathed to William Drury who changed his name by Royal Sign Manual dated 10 July 1790 to William Drury-Lowe. In 1792, he employed William Emes, who was responsible for the gardens of Calke Abbey and Kedleston Hall, to landscape the park; the actual work, including the creation of the 16 acre lake, was carried out by Emes' partner, John Webb. Williams's daughter and heir, Mary-Anne, married Robert Holden in 1800. Their son William also took the name Drury-Lowe in 1849.

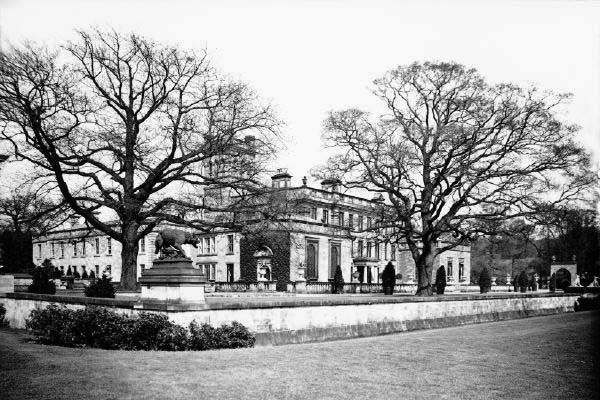
Locko Park from the southwest, 1898

Substantial additions were made to the house in the 19th century by architect Henry Stevens of Derby, including, the present west range, the parapet to which bears the dates 1804 and 1896, and the Italianate tower which rises above it dating from 1853. The porch to the east front is dated 1861.

== Current ownership ==
The house remains in the ownership of the Drury-Lowes, and is currently the residence of Lucy Palmer (the eldest daughter of Captain Patrick Drury-Lowe) and her husband David Palmer of the Huntley and Palmer biscuit family. Several members of the Drury-Lowe family have served as High Sheriff of Derbyshire.

== A side note ==
John Lowe and Robert Williams were partners in the banking firm of Lowe, Vere, and Williams.

The park is currently used as the key site for the LARP system - Lorien Trust.

== See also ==
- Grade II* listed buildings in Erewash
- Listed buildings in Dale Abbey
