= William Lowe (footballer) =

English footballer

Personal information
- Full name: William Chantry Lowe
- Date of birth: 1877
- Place of birth: Boston, Lincolnshire, England
- Date of death: 1957 (aged 79–80)
- Position: Wing half

Senior career*
Years	Team	Apps	(Gls)
1896–1897	Grimsby United		
1897–1898	Grimsby All Saints		
1898–1899	Grimsby Town	2	(0)
1899–1???	Grimsby All Saints		
- * Club domestic league appearances and goals

William Chantry Lowe (1877–1957) was an English professional footballer who played as a wing half.
