= William Drury Lowe (landowner, born 1753) =

British landowner (1753–1827)

William Drury-Lowe
- Born: 1753
- Died: 1827 (aged 73–74)
- Children: Anne

William Drury-Lowe (1753–1827) was a British merchant who inherited Locko Park, and helped create the Derby Canal. He was a High Sheriff of Derbyshire and a Deputy Lieutenant of Derbyshire.

== Biography ==
He was born to William Drury of Oakham and his wife Mary Hunt (died 1791), daughter of Thomas Hunt, a mercer in Nottingham. He was a merchant of Bread Street, London.

Drury's fortune was made some years after the death of his cousin Robert Lowe in 1785. His cousin had died leaving the valuable estate of Locko Park to his youngest daughter Anne. Anne refused the inheritance as the conditions were that she marry someone from a shortlist of eligible bachelors chosen by her father. After taking legal advice it was decided that as Drury had a Lowe ancestor (a great-grandfather), he should inherit the lands and estate on the condition that he adopt the Lowe surname and pay Anne £50,000.

Drury-Lowe, as he became in 1790, was able to extend the lands and buildings he had inherited after he invested in the creation of the Derby Canal. The canal made the collieries at Denby more viable. It also assisted in the creation of potteries at Denby which started on Drury-Lowe's land.

Drury-Lowe became the High Sheriff of Derbyshire in 1795 as well as serving as captain of a troop of Derbyshire Volunteer Cavalry for nine years. Drury-Lowe was also made the Deputy Lieutenant of Derbyshire in 1797.

== Family ==
Drury-Lowe married Anne Steer of Burton Latimer, and had no male heir. He had a daughter (Mary) Anne, baptised 1783, who married Robert Holden. Their engagement was agreed by Drury-Lowe but they eloped and were married at Gretna Green in August 1800, marriage formalized in nearby Spondon on 31 August 1800. Robert inherited Locko Park; but never lived there since his mother-in-law outlived him, dying in 1848.

Honorary titles
Preceded by Sir Henry Harper	High Sheriff of Derbyshire; 1795–17960	Succeeded by Robert Wilmot
