= William Drury Lowe (landowner, born 1802) =

British landowner (1802–1877)

William Drury Holden Drury-Lowe
- Born: 5 October 1802
- Died: 26 February 1877
- Education: Christ Church, Oxford
- Spouse: Caroline Esther Curzon
- Parent(s): Robert Holden and Mary-Anne Drury-Lowe

William Drury-Lowe (5 October 1802 – 26 February 1877) was an English landowner who inherited the Locko Park lands and became a High Sheriff of Derbyshire.

== Biography ==
William Drury Holden was born in 1802. He was the eldest son of Robert Holden of Darley Abbey and, through his wife née Mary-Anne Drury-Lowe, of Denby and Locko Park. He completed his education with a bachelor of arts from Christ Church, Oxford.

On the death of his grandmother, Anne Drury-Lowe, in 1849 William Drury Holden changed his surname to Drury-Lowe having inherited the lands and arms associated with the Locko Park estate near Spondon in Derbyshire, although this was not formally confirmed until 1853.

After his marriage in 1827 to Caroline Esther Curzon daughter of Lord Scarsdale they lived at Aston Lodge in Aston-on-Trent for a while before he began to run the estate near Kimbolton in Bedfordshire. They took their three sons to Italy in 1839 and returned to England in 1843.

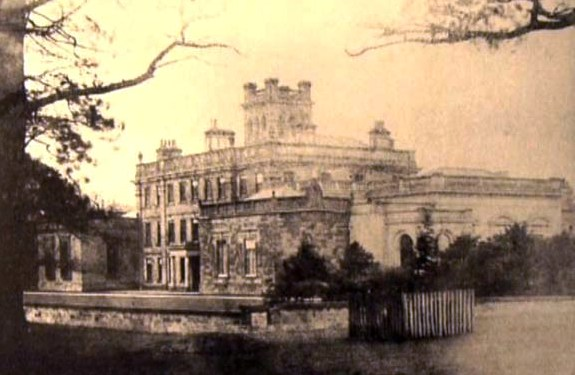
Locko Hall in 1860 including the Italianate tower built for Drury-Lowe.

In the 1850s, the Drury-Lowes lived abroad whilst extensive building work took place at Locko Park.

The building work included a picture gallery for the paintings they had obtained whilst in Italy. The tower in the Italian style reminded them of the country where their daughter Florence had been born in 1843. He returned from France in time to be the High Sheriff of Derbyshire for 1854.

In 1858, his eldest son William had married without his father's approval and they had been estranged. The two put aside their disagreements before Drury-Lowe died in 1877 when Drury-Lowe married his second wife, Lady Lucy Needham, in 1876.

William, and Caroline had the following children:

- William Drury Nathaniel Drury-Lowe (1828-31 Aug 1906)
- Lt.-Gen. Sir Drury Curzon Drury-Lowe (1830-6 Apr 1908)
- Colonel Robert Henry Curzon Drury-Lowe (1831-4 Jan 1907)
- Felicia Drury-Lowe (c. 1833-Dec 1916)
- Rebecca Lowe (b. c. 1835)
- Caroline Mary Drury-Lowe (c 1838-30 Jul 1907)
- Frances Catherine Lowe (1842-1879)
- Vincent Francis Keppel Drury-Lowe (1847-29 Apr 1905)
- Richard Curzon Sherwin Drury-Lowe (1848-1906)

Honorary titles
Preceded by Sir John Harpur Crewe Bt	High Sheriff of Derbyshire; 1854	Succeeded by Peter Arkwright of Willersley Castle
