= St. James Priory, Derby =

Benedictine monastery in Derby

St James' Priory, Derby Derby Cluniac Priory
- Coat of Arms of Cluny Abbey

- Location within Derbyshire
- Interactive map of St James' Priory, Derby; Derby Cluniac Priory

Monastery information
- Full name: St James' Priory, Derby
- Other name: Prioratus Sancti Jacobi de Derby de Aldenna
- Order: Benedictine: Cluniac order
- Established: Between 1072-1076
- Disestablished: 1536
- Mother house: Bermondsey Abbey; Cluny Abbey
- Dedication: St James
- Diocese: Diocese of Lichfield

People
- Founder: Waltheof, Earl of Northumbria

Site
- Location: St James's Street (formerly St James's Lane), Derby
- Coordinates: 52°55′20″N 1°28′42″W
- Grid reference: SK 3517 3624
- Visible remains: None

St. James Priory, also known as Derby Cluniac Priory, was a Benedictine monastery, formerly located in what is now Derby City Centre. It existed until the Dissolution of the Monasteries.

== History ==
=== Early history and Foundation ===
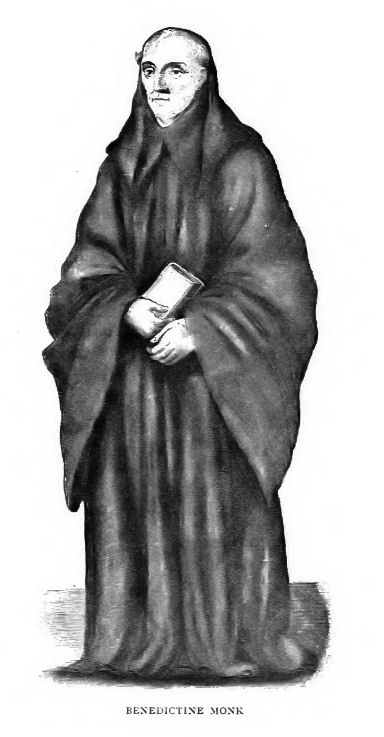
A representation of a Benedictine Monk

The priory stood on the north side of St James's Street, formerly known as St James's Lane, adjacent to the Markeaton Brook.

There had been a chapel dedicated to St James on the site from the Saxon era. Between 1072 and 1076, Waltheof, Earl of Huntingdon and Northumbria gave the chapel to the Benedictine monks of Bermondsey Abbey, who quickly developed it into a priory. The donation of the chapel was confirmed by King Stephen around 1140.

The Corporation of Derby (a forerunner of Derby City Council) paid the priory two pounds of wax each year for the right of the citizens of Derby to cross St James Bridge, constructed by the monks.

=== 13th century ===
In the 13th century a hospital was developed at the priory which catered for "the poor and unwell". Around 1230, the priory is recorded in a Patent Roll of King Henry III as being "protected as a poor hospital".

In 1279 Yves de Chassant, Abbot of Cluny, ordered that all the English Cluniac houses should be visited and inspected. When the priory was inspected on Monday 27 August 1279, it was recorded as having a prior and two monks; the prior was reported as "a worth good man... of exemplary report." One of the monks was given a similarly glowing report. The second however was judged to be "living disreputably": he was expelled from the priory and sent to Bermondsey Abbey to do penance. The inspectors also noted that the priory buildings were in good condition, with the exception of the church's roof. They also reported the priory held debts of £4 10s.

In the taxation records of Pope Nicholas IV, 1291, the priory is recorded as "slenderly endowed" with an annual income of £5 8s 4d.

In 1296 the prior Peter took two chaplains, Richard de Staunton and Peter Sincker, to court for "unlawfully seizing his hay". Their defense was that they had taken it to pay the "tithes due to the church of All Saints". The prior lost his case. Two years later, Prior Peter brought another case against the same two men, and another three chaplains, accusing them of having "broken the doors of his monastery, beaten him and stolen some of his property". This court case also failed.

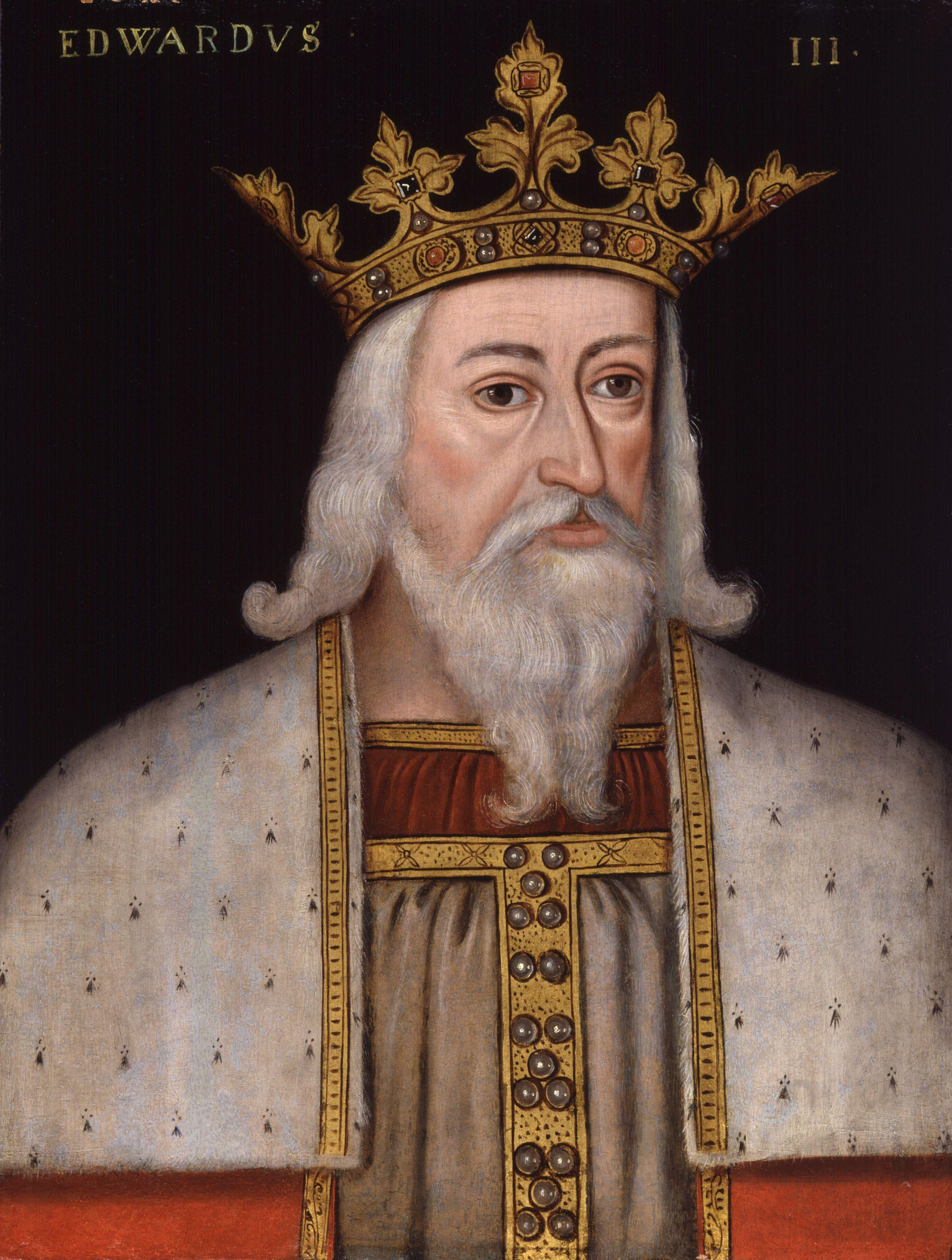
King Edward III

=== 14th century ===
On 14 September 1330 King Edward III granted crown protection to the priory for one year; it is unclear why, but it was a privilege often granted to priories in debt or with financial troubles.

In 1335 the priory, the church and the hospital were all accidentally burned down. The priory was again granted protection from the Crown, this time for two years, so that the priory could collect church alms to raise money to rebuild the church, priory and hospital.

During the Hundred Years War (1337-1453) many French alien houses (those owing allegiance to foreign mother houses) had their property and land seized by King Edward III. St James' Priory was initially allowed to keep their land in Derby and at Quorndon in Leicestershire, as Edward had already taken control of the priory's parent house, Bermondsey Abbey. Bermondsey had avoided confiscation, as its head, John de Cusancia, claimed to be Burgundian rather than French. Although the priory kept its land, the King did not spare it harsh treatment: on 3 August 1337 the priory was ordered to pay 100 shillings a year to the crown. The prior was also personally ordered to pay an additional 50 shillings for permission to take custody of the house. Later in that month (28 August 1337) the sheriff was dispatched to collect immediate payment of the 50s or, if he failed, to confiscate "the goods and chattles of the monks, and to take the prior to London to answer for his contempt".

In May 1338 Edward III changed his attitude: because of the priory's poverty, he ordered the treasury to "forgo the demand for 100s yearly"; but he ordered the sheriffs of Derby and Leicester to confiscate all of the priory's lands for the Crown. The King excused the prior from the payment of the 50s, so long as the Priory remained in the hands of the Crown.

=== 15th century ===
In 1400 Bermondsey Abbey was granted "a charter of Denization" (a form of naturalisation), meaning they were no longer considered alien but did not have all the rights of a native citizen or establishment. As a cell to Bermondsey, St. James Priory gained the same status. Thus St. James Priory was not suppressed as an alien establishment and no longer sent tribute to the French House at Cluny Abbey. English Heritage's PastScape, however, states that St James Priory gained Denization five years previously, in 1395, and that the priory at that point ceased to be a cell of Bermondsey, and operated independently.

=== 16th century ===
In 1532 the priory was recorded as having an income of £11 15s 11d per year. Of this,

- 10s came from Lenton Priory, Nottinghamshire, for the rental of land in Duston.
- 2s a year from Lilleshall Abbey, Shropshire, for land at Blackfordby.
- 12d from the master of Burton Lazars, Leicestershire.
- 12d from "master Anthony Babyngton".

The Priory also earned income from land in the Charnwood Forest, Leicestershire, where they had a corn mill and a walk mill (a treadmill powered by people or animals walking) on the River Soar.

=== The Cluniac Prayer ===
O God, by whose grace thy servants, the Holy Abbots of Cluny, enkindled with the fire of thy love, became burning and shining lights in thy Church, grant that we also may be aflame with the spirit of love and discipline, and may ever walk before thee as children of light; through Jesus Christ our Lord, who with thee, in the unity of the Holy Spirit, liveth and reigneth, one God, now and for ever.

== Dissolution and subsequent history ==
The prior at the time of the dissolution, Thomas Gainsbury, was awarded a pension of £7 per year. Following dissolution "the Free Chapel of St. James, with all the lands, ect., thereto belonging" were granted to the Corporation of Derby (a forerunner of Derby City Council).

=== Remains and artifacts ===
There are no visible remains of the priory. The proximity to the city centre of St James's Street, where the priory was located, has led the location to be built upon several times since the Dissolution. Due to this construction, the exact location of the priory on the street cannot be archaeologically confirmed.

In 1829, the site was reported as being occupied by the King's Head Inn.

Artifacts
A large key, human remains and an incised grave slab have all been found at the site.
