= King's Mead Priory =

Benedictine Nunnery in Derby, England

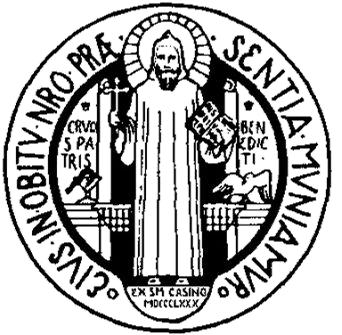
- Saint Benedict Medal

- Location within Derbyshire
- Interactive map of King's Mead Priory

Monastery information
- Full name: The Priory of St. Mary de Pratis
- Other names: The Priory of St. Mary by Derby; The Priory of the Blessed Mary juxta Derby.
- Order: Benedictine Nuns
- Established: c. 1160
- Disestablished: 1536
- Mother house: Darley Abbey (until around 1250)
- Dedication: St Mary de Pratis: St. Mary of the Meadows
- Diocese: Coventry and Lichfield
- Controlled churches: St Werburgh's Church, Derby

People
- Founder: Abbot Albinus of Darley Abbey

Site
- Location: Near Derby
- Coordinates: 52.92646°N 1.48918°W
- Grid reference: SK34433668
- Visible remains: None

King's Mead Priory was a Benedictine Priory situated west of Derby, in the area currently known as Nun's Street, or Nun's Green. It was the only Benedictine Nunnery in Derbyshire.

The Priory was dedicated to "St Mary de Pratis": St Mary of the Meadows. It became a popular place for Derbyshire's noble families to send their daughters to be educated.

== History ==
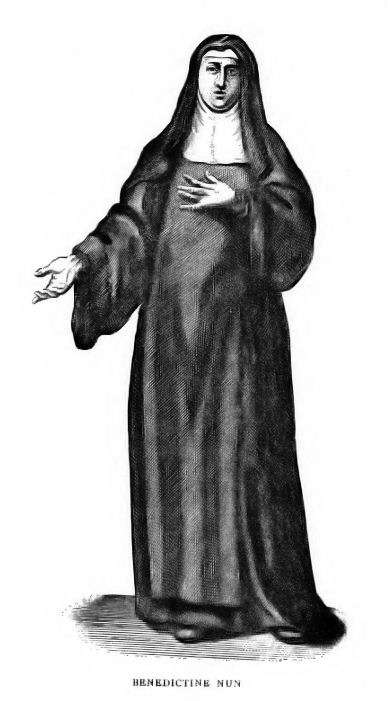
A representation of a Benedictine Nun

King's Mead Priory was founded c. 1160 by Abbot Albinus of nearby Darley Abbey; it was located a mile from Darley Abbey, West of Derby: "in a meadow by the side of the Oddebrook". It was placed under the abbot's care by Walter Durdent who was then Bishop of Coventry.

Excavations during development work in the early 19th century revealed the location had previously been the location of a Roman (or less likely Saxon) baths; however it's unclear what, if anything, remained when the priory was founded.

The priory was home to a convent of Benedictine Nuns: it was dedicated to "St. Mary de Pratis" and was under the control of Darley Abbey, its parent house.

The first Prioress appears to be named Emma; shortly after the Nunnery's foundation a warden was appointed, the first of which was William de Bussel. Part of the priory's income was five pounds paid every year from Nottingham farm rents on the orders of Henry III. In consideration of which the nuns were to say prayers for Henry's father King John.

King's Mead's relationship with its parent house, Darley Abbey, began to disintegrate because of disagreements about donations made to the King's Mead. Disagreement reached such a level that Roger Weseham, Bishop of Coventry and Lichfield was forced to intervene in around 1250; he brokered an agreement that freed the Nuns at King's Mead (and their property) from control of the Abbot and Canons at Darley Abbey. Property was firmly divided and it was decreed that Darley Abbey would have "nihil potestatis nihil juris" No Right and No Power over the Priory and its property. In these negotiations, The Nuns at King's Mead gained St Werburgh's Church, Derby, "Welleflat" (a tithe near Mackworth), a mill and adjacent meadow at "Sirreiers", 18 acres of land previously belonging to Ralph Unenath, "Becroft", and some houses in Derby. In return the nuns surrendered to Darley Abbey an acre and a half of land in Scarcliffe and an acre of land in Langwith.

During the reign of King Edward I (1272-1307), the priory is recorded as earning an annual rent of £14 for their properties in Derby. They earned an additional six marks of silver from their three mills on the Oddebrook. At this time the priory is recorded as being in control of the manors of Aldewerk, Normanton, Botterleg, and Wytunton. The priory's garden and surrounding land was valued at 20s. a year.

A petition was put forward to the king by the priory citing poverty due to the heavy number of visitors they had to entertain. On 2 September 1327, King Edward III granted "his special protection" to the monastery for a period of 3 years (starting December 1327). This was to cover the Priory's property and debts following "unusually heavy mortality amongst their cattle" and "the badness of the past few years". Robert of Alsop and Simon of Little Chester were appointed as custodians of the Priory, as per the nun's wishes.

The priory still seems to be in debt seven years after the royal protection was granted, as the nun's poverty is mentioned by the bishop in his letters appointing the new Prioress in December 1334.

Also during the reign of King Edward III (1327-1377) the Prioress paid £30 for a licence which allowed the priory to take possession of 10 messuages, a mill, four shops, 6 cottages, 50 acres of land and 10 acres of meadow.

Henry IV (1399–1413) issued the priory with charters confirming payment to the priory of the annual payment of 100 shillings from the town of Nottingham. Charters also granted them 27 acres of land (with tenements and common pasture) in the Peak forest.

During the reign of Henry VII (1485-1509) the Abbot of Burton Abbey lodged a complaint at the Chancery Court against the Prioress of King's Mead, Isabel de Stanley. He claimed that she had refused to pay rent he was owed, for 21 years. When confronted by the Abbot's bailiff, Prioress Isabel is reported to have said:

"Wenes these churles to overlede me or sue the law agayne me? They shall not be so hardy but they shall avye upon their bodies and be nailed with arrowes; for I am a gentlewoman comen of the greatest of Lancashire and Cheshire; and that they shall know right well."

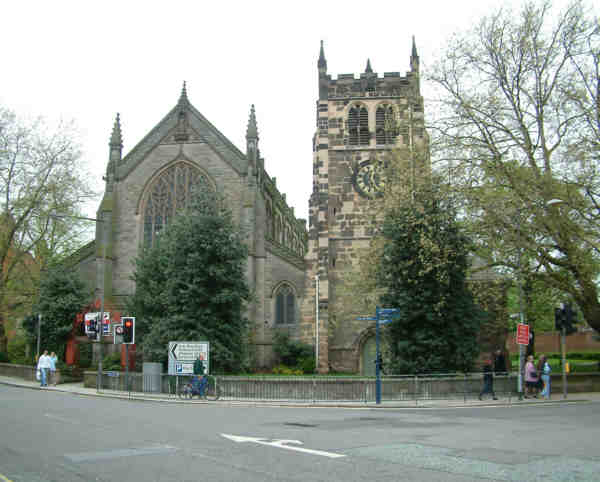
St Werburgh's Church, Derby

Isabella de Stanley was closely "related to the nobleman who espoused the mother of Henry VII".

In November 1509, Geoffrey Blythe, Bishop of Coventry and Lichfield sent his suffragan Thomas Weell, titular Bishop of Pavada (near Istanbul, Turkey), to "inclose Joan Hethe, nun of the priory of the Blessed Mary juxta Derby, for a solitary life in the chapel at Macclesfield." Weell had the title of Bishop but it was a status title only as there was no cathedral or known congregation. Weell had been the rector of Thorley in Hertfordshire and went on to be a Bishop in the Diocese of Coventry and Litchfield.

The Valor Ecclesiasticus in 1535 records the Priory as having an annual value of £21 18s 8d. (£18 6s 2d remaining after expenses), with an additional 40s a year being brought by St Werburgh's Church, Derby. This small income (perhaps the reason for the priory's financial problems, poverty and debt) was supplemented with income earned from acting as teachers and providing boarding for their female students: members of local noble families.
The Priory seems never to have rectified its financial problems: in the Reign of King Henry VIII (1509-1547) the priory is recorded of having a debt of 20 marks.

=== Following Dissolution ===
The Priory was dissolved in 1536.

The site of the priory was granted in 1541 to Francis Talbot, 5th Earl of Shrewsbury who sold it to Thomas Sutton in 1542. The priory passed through the Sutton family, and then to Sir Simon Degge.

In 1825 the priory was in the ownership of Francis Mundy (of Markeaton) who constructed new streets and properties on the site. Whilst this work was being undertaken in March 1825, in an area beyond the just boundaries of the priory, workmen struck a stone coffin lying less than 2 ft under ground, containing the bones of a small woman. The stone coffin had been accidentally broken during excavation works (this is how it was discovered). As it was damaged it was not thought worth preserving it. Fragments of human bone were found in the area adjoining the coffin.
A "tesslated pavement" was also discovered: Made of multi-coloured 3 inch square tiles, it measured 9 ft by 4 ft and was bordered by foundation stones of what were thought to be side and end walls; adjacent were fragments of what appeared to be former arches. It was thought this was part of a Roman (or less likely Saxon) baths.

Nothing remains of the priory. Its location is marked by Nun's Street, Derby: the priory was located roughly in the location of 124 and 126 Nun Street.

== Donations ==
King Henry III (1216-1272) ordered the bailiffs of Nottingham to pay the priory £5 a year (which was taken from the fee-farm rent) so that the nuns could pray for the soul of his father, King John.

Between 1227 and 1243, Hubert de Burgh, 1st Earl of Kent, donated 2 marks a year to "the nuns of St. Mary by Derby".

In 1229 King Henry III gave the nuns a Messuage and 12 acres of land at "Bistallegh and Ashop".

In 1230 Lancelin FitzLancelin and his wife Avice donated 13 acres of land and a messuage at "Stokes", along with "300 sheep (and their lambs), 8 oxen, 6 cows, 30 goats and 20 pigs"; in return prayers were to be said for the donors and their family.

In 1236 Henry de Donison, his wife Eleanor, and Robert de Stanton donated an acre of woodland at "Thursmanleigh" (now known as Nunsfield, near Alvaston).

== Prioresses of King's Mead ==
Many of the Prioresses were members of leading families in Derbyshire: reflecting the fact that many sent their daughters here to be educated.

- Emma, c. 1160
- Margaret, early 13th century
- Emma II, occurs 1230
- Raimon, early 13th century
- Rametta, occurs 1236
- Sibilla, c. 1258 (fn. 24)
- Ellen de Beresford, resigned 1334 (perhaps due to the priory's debt)
- Joan Touchet, appointed 1334, died of plague 1349
- Alice de Ireland, appointed 1349
- Elizabeth Stanley, occurs 1431, died 1457
- Elizabeth Mackworth, 1457-1487
- Margaret Cholmeley, appointed 1487
- Isabel de Stanley, occurs during the reign of Henry VII
- Elizabeth, occurs 1514
- Alices Knowles, died 1531
- Joan Curzon, appointed 1531

== Remains and Artifacts ==
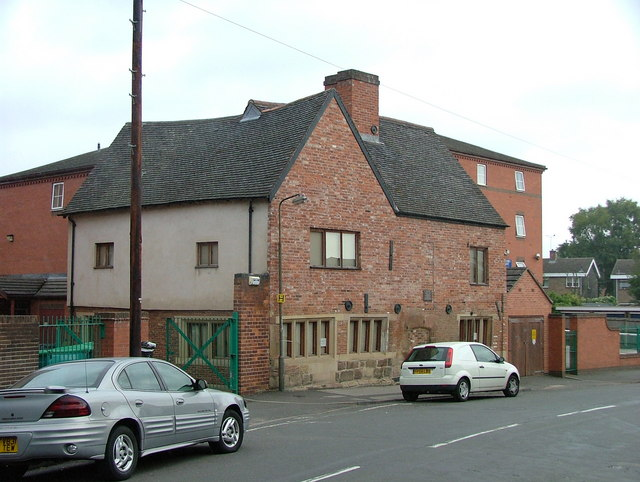
17th-18th Century house on Nun's Street, Derby; displaying elements of earlier stonework

Nothing remains of the priory buildings: the area (known as Nun's Meadow and Nun's Street) has been heavily developed since the 19th century. Some of the stonework, however, may have been reused in local buildings.

Artifacts, including a stone coffin, discovered during building work in the early 19th century were not preserved.

Impressions of the priory's seals from c. 1200 are still in existence but are not in great condition. Another seal dating from the 1461 (shaped as a pointed oval) depicts the Virgin Mary enthroned, with the Baby Jesus on her left knee.
