= Listed buildings in Sleaford =

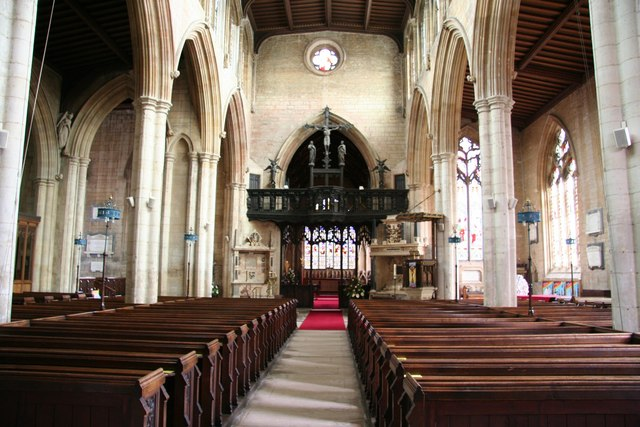
The Decorated Gothic interior of St Denys' Church dates to the 14th century.

Sleaford – historically called New Sleaford – is a market town in the North Kesteven district of Lincolnshire, England. There are 181 listed buildings in the civil parish of Sleaford, which, along with the town, incorporates the village of Quarrington, the hamlet of Holdingham and the former ancient parish of Old Sleaford. (Note: New Sleaford, Old Sleaford, Quarrington and Holdingham parishes were part of Sleaford Urban District from 1894 until urban districts were abolished in 1974. The Local Government (Successor Parishes) Order 1973 merged all four parishes into one new successor civil parish called Sleaford after the urban district was abolished.) One of the buildings is classified by Historic England as being in Grade I, six in Grade II* and 174 in Grade II.

In the United Kingdom, the term "listed building" refers to a building or other structure officially designated as being of special architectural, historical or cultural significance. These buildings are in three grades: Grade I consists of buildings of outstanding architectural or historical interest; Grade II* includes particularly significant buildings of more than local interest; Grade II consists of buildings of special architectural or historical interest. Buildings in England are listed by the Secretary of State for Culture, Media and Sport on recommendations provided by Historic England, which also determines the grading.

A small number of Sleaford's medieval buildings have survived. St Denys' Church in Sleaford and St Botolph's in Quarrington date to the 12th and 13th centuries respectively; considered a particularly fine example of England's Decorated Gothic church architecture, St Denys' is especially noted for its flowing tracery and is Sleaford's only Grade-I-listed building. The half-timbered vicarage immediately to the north is 15th-century and Grade-II*-listed. Though the present building dates to the 18th century, Cogglesford Mill also has medieval origins and is the only remaining watermill of the dozen or so which were once powered by the River Slea; it is a testament to the river's economic importance from the Saxon period onwards. It is likely that a market was held at Sleaford during the late Saxon period, but it grew under its post-conquest lords of the manor, the Bishops of Lincoln, who used the settlement as a base (constructing Sleaford Castle, of which only a fragment now survives) and extracted produce through demesne farming. The bishops also tried to create some commercial growth through granting burgage tenure, limited freedoms and the right to hold a market, so that they could generate an income through charging rents, levying tolls and taxing market traders. As a result, the town's historic core comprises the market place and the four roads which meet at it: Northgate, Southgate, Eastgate and Westgate; many of the listed buildings are found in this area.

Buildings in this core often date to the 18th and 19th centuries and include William Alvey's fine Baroque house on Northgate, the Manor House on Northgate inset with medieval fragments, and Sessions House on the Market Place, as well as several dozen more modest domestic buildings and shops. The Carre family, who owned the manor in the 16th and 17th centuries, were responsible for the grammar school, the hospital and the almshouses, though the buildings all date to the Victorian period. During the Industrial Revolution, the Slea was canalised in 1794 and the Sleaford Navigation which managed it constructed its offices along Carre Street where the canal terminated; industries and wharves sprung up there. The canal brought trade to Sleaford and the town prospered. The 19th-century builders Kirk and Parry constructed or added to numerous public buildings and private residences, including the listed Lafford Terrace and their own houses on Southgate and at Westholme respectively, while the new gasworks powered lamps around the town from 1839. In 1857, the railways arrived and the station was built in a Gothic style. Sleaford's agricultural location and its new transport links encouraged seed trading, malting and other agriculture-related industry in the late 19th century: the seed merchant Charles Sharpe's Grade-II-listed house, The Pines, is on Boston Road, while the massive disused Edwardian Bass and Co. maltings off Mareham Lane is listed as Grade II*. In the late 20th century, Sleaford's urban area expanded to incorporate the surrounding villages of Quarrington and Holdingham. None of the modern suburban housing built at this time has been listed, but the historic cores of those settlements include several listed farmhouses and cottages. Old Place, the much-modified former manor house at the former settlement of Old Sleaford, now also sits within the town's urban area.

== Key ==
Grade	Criteria
I	Buildings of exceptional interest, sometimes considered to be internationally important
II*	Particularly important buildings of more than special interest
II	Buildings of national importance and special interest

== Listed buildings ==
Listed buildings in Sleaford
Name	Location	Image	Grade	Date	Description	Ref.
Parish Church of St Denys	Market Place; TF 06883 45893		I	c. 1180 (tower), with later medieval nave, aisles and transept, and Victorian alterations and spire	There has probably been a church in Sleaford since at least the Norman Conquest, but the oldest parts of St Denys' Church date to c. 1180. It consists of an Early English Gothic tower, with a stone broach spire, a Decorated Gothic nave and aisles, and a north transept. Kirk and Parry restored the church in 1853 and the spire was rebuilt after it was struck by lightning in 1883. The rood screen is medieval and was removed from Lincoln Cathedral. St Denys' is considered to be an outstanding example of Decorated Gothic church architecture in England, with its tracery being especially praised.	
Carre's Hospital, pump and sun-dial in the forecourt and wall along Carre Street	Eastgate; TF 06917 45851		II*	1830, with an extension of 1861	The L-shaped Carre's Hospital is built on the site of the Carre family's house. Designed by H. E. Kendall, the east range of 1830 spans nine windows; the south range, completed between 1841 and 1846 (possibly by Charles Kirk) spans seven windows and has a large central chapel and a Perpendicular Gothic window overlooking the courtyard. There is a front lawn with a sundial and water pump.	
Church of St Botolph	Town Road, Quarrington; TF 05411 44468		II*	13th century, with later medieval and 19th century fabric	A church at Quarrington is recorded in the Domesday Book; however, the 13th-century north arcade is the oldest part of the existing church. Its tower and spire date to the next century and St Botolph's listing reflects the "excellent" 14th-century tracery in two of its windows. The chancel was rebuilt when Charles Kirk restored the church in 1862−3.	
Former maltings of Bass Industrial Estate	Mareham Lane; TF 07444 45255		II*	1907	Local barley production and the town's railway links made Sleaford desirable for brewing beer. Bass & Co. constructed the maltings in brick between 1892 and 1907. They comprise eight separate pavilions with a four-storey tower in the centre; the total frontage is nearly 1,000 ft. Pevsner and colleagues commented that "for sheer impressiveness little in English industrial architecture can equal the scale of this building." The maltings at Sleaford closed in 1959, though parts of the building were let for other uses. Vacant since 2000, the site has been damaged by fire on several occasions and is listed among English Heritage's most "at risk" buildings.	
Manor House, Rhodes House, wall and gate piers to cobbled yard and garden wall to no. 33	Northgate; TF 06768 46001		II*	16th century, with much 19th century modification (No 31); mid 18th century (No 33)	Set back from the street and entered across a courtyard, the Manor House is largely 19th-century Gothic, but attached to part of a 16th- or 17th-century building. The architectural historian Sir Nikolaus Pevsner and colleagues considered it a "jigsaw puzzle", for it incorporates medieval stonework, including a 14th-century chimney piece from the Old Deanery in Lincoln and masonry from Sleaford Castle, as well as early modern stonework. It is thought that Charles Kirk may have been responsible for much of this. It is, in Pevsner et al's view, "hard to discriminate between what is genuine and what is 19th-century fancy". The adjoining Georgian Rhodes House is brick-built and faces onto Northgate.	
Town Hall (Sessions House)	Market Place; TF 06795 45870		II*	1831	Designed by H. E. Kendall, the Gothic Revival Sessions House has two storeys topped with an embattled parapet. Facing onto the Market Place, the ground level is arcaded with six pointed arches; the first floor has six windows. The building served as the magistrates court for the Sleaford area (formerly the Sleaford Petty Sessions) until 2010. It was converted to a restaurant in 2010. It had also served as the meeting place of Kesteven County Council from 1889 to 1960 and for the town's urban district council from 1894 to 1911.	
Vicarage	Market Place; TF 06868 45924		II*	15th century	A two-storey timber-framed building, the Vicarage is 15th-century, with a late 16th-century chimney-piece and a brick extension of 1861 by Charles Kirk. The ground floor of the earlier wing is rendered; the first floor is half-timbered and contains a central bay window beneath a large gable with timber jetties.	
Garden House at The Pines	Boston Road; TF 07112 45598		II	c. 1880	A hexagonal, wooden-panelled garden house at the Pines on Boston Road, a house owned by the seed merchant Charles Sharpe in the late 19th century. The exterior and interior are decorated with split branches, and the windows are stained glass.	
Old Place. Garden wall to the south of Old Place	Boston Road; TF 07597 45878		II	1530s with much from the early to mid 19th century	Old Place contains a Tudor stone core, dating mostly to the 1530s, but altered and with a brick second floor added probably in the early 1820s. There are extensive 19th-century Gothic additions. Its eastern wings date to the early Victorian period (having been completed by 1849) and its northern extension was built between 1888 and 1903. Its garden wall is built from medieval stone fragments. The house occupies the site of the manor house at Old Sleaford, owned by the Hussey family from the 15th century to the early 16th century, when the Carre family took over the estate (it passed into the hands of the Earls, later Marquesses, of Bristol in 1688). It became a farm house during the Carre family's ownership, but was converted into multiple residences in the late 1940s and renovated in the 1980s by the builders Jelson and Co.	
The Pines and attached former warehouse and offices	Boston Road; TF 07059 45574		II	c. 1830 and later	The site was developed by John Sharpe, a seedsman, in the 1830s, then enlarged by his son, Charles, fifty years later. The house is in yellow brick with stone decorations. Of two storeys and spanning five bays, the east front has a central tower with doors fitted between two pairs of Doric pilasters. The 13-bay former warehouse is attached to the south.	
Old Place Cottages	1 and 2 Boston Road; TF 07632 45886		II	Unknown	These coursed-stone cottages with slate roofs have been converted from stables belonging to Old Place.	
—	7–17 Boston Road; TF 06928 45568		II	Early 19th century	A set of six brick two-storey terraced houses, with one window on each storey	
—	10 and 12 Boston Road; TF 06918 45543		II	18th century	A pair of three-storey brick terraced houses with modern shopfronts	
—	19 Boston Road; TF 06948 45575		II	Early 19th century	A two-storey brick building with one window on each floor	
—	21–25 Boston Road; TF 06958 45580		II	Late 18th or early 19th century	A set of two-storey brick terraced houses, which have a window on each floor	
—	27–31 Boston Road; TF 06969 45586		II	Early 19th century	Three brick, two-storey terraced properties with doors encased in stone pilasters and quoins at the ends of the terrace	
—	33–37 Boston Road; TF 06987 45595		II	Early 19th century	A brick two-storey terraced block with three windows on the first floor; Nos 33 and 35 are rendered and form one property. The latter has a late Victorian shopfront.	
—	41 Boston Road; TF 06997 45599		II	Early 19th century	A brick two-storey building, with an arched passageway to the left side. It has four bays and a wooden doorcase.	
Doorway and Wall to premises occupied by W K Morton and Sons	Carre Street; TF 06916 45778		II	c. 1792	A portico with the inscription "1792 Sleaford Navigation", the doorway has two large stone pilasters under a triangular pediment. The doorway was moved from an unknown location to this site in c. 1823.	
Former office building in centre of yard formerly occupied by Hubbard and Phillips Ltd.	Carre Street; TF 06930 45805		II	Mid 19th century	A stone two-storey building in the Tudor style, it is believed to have housed the offices of the Sleaford Navigation company and bears a carved rendition of that company's armorial bearings above the doorway. Pevsner and colleagues call it Navigation House and date it to 1838–39. According to the local historians Anthony Brand and Simon Pawley, it was built in 1838 by Bothewary and Brewin, of Grantham, probably to a design by Charles Kirk.	
Sleaford Castle	Castle Causeway; TF 06514 45626		II	1123 to 1139 (mostly ruined)	The only surviving part of the castle is a small section of masonry. Constructed by Alexander, Bishop of Lincoln, it was double-moated. Thought to have been built between 1123 and 1139, Sleaford Castle remained in a good state of repair into at least the 1530s, but was ruined by the 17th century. Its earthworks remain visible.	
—	2 Castle Causeway; TF 06364 45568		II	Late 18th or early 19th century	A one-storey, coursed-rubble house with two bays	
—	2 Church Lane; TF 06826 45946		II	Late 17th century	A single-storey stone cottage with a brick gable dating to the 19th century	
—	2a Church Lane; TF 06818 45948		II	18th century	A single-storey cottage in brick with one bay	
Galley Hill Farmhouse	The Drove; TF 06586 46146		II	Late 17th century	A stone, gabled building with two storeys and two bays. The building was altered in the 19th century, from when the roof dates.	
Coggesford Mill Farmhouse	Eastgate; TF 07450 46149		II	Mid 18th century	This brick farmhouse is single-storey with a gabled roof.	
Cogglesford Mill, Mill Race and Bridge	Eastgate; TF 07459 46128		II	18th century, with 19th-century additions	A two-storey watermill, the ground floor dates from the 18th century; the upper floor is a 19th-century addition. The building is made of a mix of limestone rubble and brick. The west front has a door, windows and a sliding entrance leading to the loft, while the southern side has a brick arch. There is a 19th-century shed attached to the north, a stepped mill race with brick walls to the south, and a brick footbridge to the west.	
Entrance to Gas Works	Eastgate; TF 07567 46262		II	1839	The Sleaford Gas Light Company was founded in 1838 and its gas works opened the following year. Probably designed by H. E. Kendall, the entrance is in stone and has two two-storey gabled pavilions at its ends connected by lower two-storey links to a central archway with buttresses and a crow-stepped gable. The buildings were extended to the rear in the 1890s, but these additions were demolished in 1966–1968 after gas production ceased at Sleaford.	
Lafford Terrace	Eastgate; TF 07097 45919		II	1856	This Italianate yellow brick and stone terrace was built by Kirk and Parry in 1856. It has one three-storey pavilion in the centre and two at each end connected by two-storey links. Although initially residential, the leases to all but one of the apartments were purchased by Kesteven County Council (KCC) in 1925 and developed into their offices; the final lease was acquired in the late 1930s. After KCC's abolition in 1974, it was transferred to the newly established North Kesteven District Council, serving as its offices thereafter and, after a major extension in 1991, becoming its sole office building and host to its council chamber.	
Lock to the south of Cogglesford Mill Farm	Eastgate; TF 07461 46122		II	Late 18th century	Made of brick with some 20th-century concrete additions, this lock incorporates stone gate recesses, although the gates have been removed.	
Premises adjoining Sleaford Maternity Home to the west	Eastgate; TF 06974 45937		II	Early 19th century	A two-storey brick building with three bays and a garden wall	
Stables, Loose Box, Workshop, Wash House and Store at Cogglesford Mill Farm	Eastgate; TF 07466 46151		II	Late 18th century	A brick, two-storey building with seven bays and a stable door on the front and adjoining 19th-century loose boxes, wagon hovel and workshop	
—	1 Eastgate; TF 06921 45913		II	17th century	A one-storey building (with a gabled attic) in coarsed rubble. On the street front is a 19th-century shopfront with three windows and a door beneath an oriel window. The church-facing side to the rear is 18th-century and spans two storeys and three bays with a 19th-century extension in brick across three bays.	
—	2 Eastgate; TF 06922 45870		II	Late 18th century	A two-storey brick building spanning two bays with a door and window on the ground floor	
—	3 Eastgate; TF 06932 45902		II	Late 18th century	This three-storey brick building has two windows on the second floor, one on the first and a late 19th-century shopfront on the ground level.	
The Old House, including malthouse and adjoining outbuildings, garden gateway and archway	4 Eastgate; TF 06962 45878		II	Early 17th century	A rubble two-storey building with stone gables and Georgian brick extensions. The street front consists of four windows on the first floor and three on the ground floor; the eastern gable includes a stone window dated to around the 17th century. There are adjoining outbuildings and malthouses and the stonework incorporates 15th-century material from Sleaford Castle.	
—	5 and 7 Eastgate; TF 06939 45904		II	Late 18th or early 19th century	A three-storey painted brick building with three bays and a modern shopfront	
—	6 and 8 Eastgate; TF 06977 45900		II	Early 19th century	A red brick building split into two cottages (formerly three) of two storeys. The whole block spans five bays.	
—	9 Eastgate; TF 06946 45908		II	Late 18th century	A three-storey brick building with two bays and a wooden doorcase	
—	11 Eastgate; TF 06952 45911		II	18th century	A two-storey brick building across four bays with a carriage entrance beneath the first floor on the right	
—	13 and 15 Eastgate; TF 06965 45916		II	18th century	No 13 was the Waggon and Horses public house, and the brick building occupies three storeys across three bays. No 15 has two storeys and two bays. The pub closed in 2011 and has been converted into apartments.	
—	23 Eastgate; TF 07018 45935		II	18th century	A two-storey building in coursed rubble, rendered on the street front. The building has a datestone of 1788.	
—	29 Eastgate; TF 07037 45940		II	Early 19th century	A two-storey brick building with a slate roof and three bays; there is a centre passage on the ground floor.	
—	37 Eastgate; TF 07052 45947		II	18th century	A brick building spanning three bays and two storeys	
—	43–47 Eastgate; TF 07070 45977		II	Early 19th century	All of these terraced properties are brick with one window on the ground floor and all but No 47 have doorways with pilasters.	
—	49–55 Eastgate; TF 07075 45991		II	Early 19th century	Two-storey terraced buildings in brick, with each plot spanning two bays with one window on the ground floor	
—	57 and 59 Eastgate; TF 07077 46002		II	Early 19th century	Two-storey brick terraced buildings. No 57 has two windows and No 59 has one on the first floor; both have Tuscan doorways on the ground floor.	
—	61 Eastgate; TF 07079 46009		II	Early 19th century	A two-storey rendered building	
—	63 and 65 Eastgate; TF 07082 46016		II	1849	An ashlar-fronted two-storey building with four stone windows on the first floor and paired entrance doors on the ground floor	
Sleaford East Signal Box	Grantham Road; TF 06878 45398		II	c. 1882	This brick and wood two-storey signal box was constructed for the Great Northern and Great Eastern Joint Railway. It has a slate roof and ornate bargeboards.	
The school and schoolhouse	17 Grantham Road; TF 06737 45270		II	1867	Built and designed by Charles Kirk, the former schoolhouse and chapel once served Quarrington as a primary school. It was built in 1867. The school was extended in 1898, the 1960s and 1980s. In 2002, the school moved to another site, leaving the premises vacant. The original building is single-storey in coursed stone and adopts a Gothic Revival style, with mullioned windows. The Grantham Road front has six windows and a central gable supporting a school bell; the rear has a doorway between two gables. There is also a school chapel with an arched roof inside and buttresses on the exterior.	
Anna House Farmhouse	Holdingham; TF 05648 47308		II	17th or early 18th century	A rubble two-storey farmhouse with a gabled roof and slate tiling. There are two windows on each storey and a rear extension in brick to the rear.	
Holdingham Farmhouse	Holdingham; TF 08862 47995		II	Late 18th century	A two-storey red brick and partly rendered house	
Outbuildings to the north of Anna House Farmhouse	Holdingham; TF 05629 47372		II	Unknown	A set of coursed-rubble outbuildings with pantile roofs	
—	1 Holdingham; TF 05889 47144		II	17th or early 18th century	A single-storey cottage made of rubble with brick sides and two windows. Extensions and outbuildings are included in the listing.	
—	12 Holdingham; TF 05810 47186		II	18th century	A one-storey coursed-rubble building with three windows and brick gable ends	
—	13 and 14 Holdingham; TF 06150 47126		II	Mid 18th century	Two rubble cottages of one storey (with attics) and five bays	
Mill buildings to Holdingham Farm	Holdingham Lane; TF 08870 47966		II	19th century	A brick building in two parts with an octagonal tollhouse for the lock keeper	
Schoolroom annexe to Kesteven and Sleaford High School	19 Jermyn Street; TF 06745 45607		II	c. 1870	Probably built by Kirk and Parry, this coursed-stone office building with Gothic Revival details has been converted into an annexe for Kesteven and Sleaford High School. It consists of one storey and an attic, and the layout follows an L-shape. The eastern corner of the street front has a gabled plinth. It likely served as an office for Kirk and Parry's architectural practice, which was based on Jermyn Street. From around 1902 to 1927, this building served as Kesteven County Council's offices, before the county council moved into Lafford Terrace; it was then occupied by Sleaford Urban District Council, who had already occupied the surrounding depot and offices since 1919, before it became part of Kesteven and Sleaford High School in 1956, after which it was converted to an annexe for the school.	
—	20 and 21, Jermyn Street (and store adjacent to 20 to the west); TF 06703 45618		II	18th century	A pair of two-storey brick houses across four bays	
—	22 and 23 Jermyn Street; TF 06720 45622		II	Early or mid-19th century	A pair of two-storey coursed-stone houses with four bays and paired doorways	
—	24 Jermyn Street; TF 06730 45626		II	c. 18th century	A two-storey stone building with an attic of two bays; the ground floor has two 19th-century windows	
—	25 Jermyn Street; TF 06738 45629		II	Early or mid-19th century	A two-storey, coursed-stone building with two windows on either floor	
—	26 Jermyn Street; TF 06753 45634		II	18th century	A brick building of two storeys and an attic, spanning three bays at irregular heights. There is a datestone of 1793; it was owned by a tanner, William Rowland, in the late 18th century.	
—	1–6 Kingston Terrace; TF 07095 46058		II	1857	Built by Marmaduke Bennison, this group of brick-fronted terraced houses are in ashlar and follow a Jacobethan style. There is a central gable between six dormer windows. Each of the six entrance doors are paired and the windows are mullioned. In conjunction with Lafford Terrace, Pevsner and his colleagues note that Kingston Terrace and some of the surrounding mid-19th century buildings give "this part of the town... the comfortable and prosperous air of a mid-19th-century spa town".	
Former lodge to Westholme	Leicester Street; TF 06521 45888		II	Mid-19th century	A two-storey building in coursed stone with a steep roof. The building has two mullioned windows on the first floor and two windows on the ground level.	
Former stables to Westholme	Leicester Street; TF 06550 45896		II	Mid-19th century	This L-shaped stone building has a slate roof and, on the right side, a central gable above an arched carriage entrance.	
Garden wall to the rear of former stables to Westholme	Leicester Street; TF 06621 45916		II	c. 1850	This 100-foot (30 m)-long rubble wall contains medieval fragments recycled by Charles Kirk the younger, probably from church restorations he conducted.	
Westholme	Leicester Street; TF 06477 45920		II	c. 1849	Built by Charles Kirk the younger for his business partner Thomas Parry, this stone house is, in Pevsner's words, "an ebullient essay in French 15th-century domestic Gothic". Following an irregular layout, the two-storey house incorporates tall chimney stacks, dragon motifs, carved pinnacles, four-arch windows and doorways and steep roofs. After the Second World War, it came into public ownership and was home to the headquarters of Kesteven County Council's library service, before being used by St George's College of Technology (now St George's Academy).	
Eastern Cartshed to storage depot and stables at Bass Maltings	Mareham Lane; TF 07230 45235		II	c. 1900	Designed by A. Couchman, this is a single-storey, red-brick cartshed with a tile roof and plinth in blue brick. The west front has three iron columns, filled in with 20th-century additions. It was built c. 1900 and is part of the Bass Maltings complex.	
Gateways and Walls at Bass Maltings	Mareham Lane; TF 07421 45181		II	c. 1900	The wall around the Bass Maltings complex is made of red brick, dressed with stone and features iron railings. The main gateway has stone decoration and brick piers topped with gas lights; it encloses cast iron gates. Each side has smaller gateways under Tudor-style arches and with cast iron gates. It was all designed by A. Couchman.	
Number 1 Mess Room at Bass Maltings	Mareham Lane; TF 07336 45199		II	c. 1900	A former mess room serving the Bass Maltings complex. It was designed by A. Couchman and built of red brick with a tile roof. The front has four windows, all boarded up; the doorways and windows on the sides are also boarded.	
Number 2 Mess Room at Bass Maltings	Mareham Lane; TF 07392 45191		II	c. 1900	A former mess room serving the Bass Maltings complex. It was designed by A. Couchman and built of red brick with a tile roof. The front has four windows, all boarded up; the doorways and windows on the sides are also boarded.	
Number 3 Mess Room at Bass Maltings	Mareham Lane; TF 07433 45186		II	c. 1900	A former mess room serving the Bass Maltings complex. It was designed by A. Couchman and built of red brick with a tile roof. The front has three boarded-up windows and there are boarded-up doorways and windows on the sides.	
Number 4 Mess Room at Bass Maltings	Mareham Lane; TF 07476 45180		II	c. 1900	A former mess room serving the Bass Maltings complex. It was designed by A. Couchman and built of red brick with a tile roof. The front has four windows, all boarded up; the doorways and windows on the sides are also boarded.	
Number 5 Mess Room at Bass Maltings	Mareham Lane; TF 07534 45172		II	c. 1900	A former mess room serving the Bass Maltings complex. It was designed by A. Couchman and built of red brick with a tile roof. The front has four windows, some boarded up; there are doorways and windows on the sides.	
Offices at Bass Maltings	Mareham Lane; TF 07148 45182		II	c. 1900	The Bass Maltings' former office block was designed by A. Couchman and built in a single storey in red brick with a tile roof. The front has a door and fanlight with three-bay projections either side; on the left is an archway.	
Redcroft	Mareham Lane; TF 07129 45197		II	c. 1900	Now privately owned, "Redcroft" was built to house the manager of the Bass Maltings complex. Designed by A. Couchman, it is in red brick with a tile roof and spans two storeys. The north side has a projecting centre with two windows and a half-timbered gable. There is an archway with a panelled door on the ground level. The right and rear sides of the building have bay windows.	
Storage depot and stables at Bass Maltings	Mareham Lane; TF 07109 45285		II	c. 1900	Now disused, this two-storey storage depot and stables (designed by A. Couchman) served the Bass Maltings complex. Built in red brick with a tile roof, the front spans eight windows and has a projecting centre with two windows. On either side is a stable door below a loft door in the gables.	
Weigh offices at Bass Maltings	Mareham Lane; TF 07230 45210		II	c. 1900	Now disused, this single-storey building (designed by A. Couchman) comprised the Weigh Offices of the Bass Maltings complex. Built in red brick with a tile roof, the front has boarded-up windows and a pair of double doors; there are three other doors to the right. There is a weigh machine in front of the windows and a small wing to the left of the building.	
Western cartshed to storage depot and stables at Bass Maltings	Mareham Lane; TF 07209 45237		II	c. 1900	Designed by A. Couchman, this is a single-storey, red-brick cartshed with a tile roof and plinth in blue brick. The west front has three iron columns filled in with 20th-century additions. It was built c. 1900 and is part of the Bass Maltings complex.	
Bass Maltings Cottages	1 Mareham Lane; TF 07093 45256		II	c. 1900	A single two-storey red-brick house, built c. 1900 to designs by A. Couchman. It was initially a cottage to house workers at the nearby Bass Maltings complex. The house has a projecting wing to the right (with a window on each floor) and a projecting porch on the left over the doorway beside a single ground-floor window.	
Bass Maltings Cottages	2 and 3 Mareham Lane; TF 07114 45253		II	c. 1900	This pair of two-storey semi-detached cottages in red brick was built to house workers at the nearby Bass Maltings complex, but has been converted into private residences. Each has a gabled front with a window on each floor and a door set back on the outer side of the house. Built in c. 1900, the houses were designed by A. Couchman and altered in the 20th century.	
Bass Maltings Cottages	4 and 5 Mareham Lane; TF 07135 45250		II	c. 1900	This pair of two-storey, semi-detached cottages in red brick was built to house workers at the nearby Bass Maltings complex, but has been converted into private residences. Each has a gabled front with a window on each floor and a door set back on the outer side of the house. Built in c. 1900, the houses were designed by A. Couchman and altered in the 20th century.	
Bass Maltings Cottages	6 and 7 Mareham Lane; TF 07156 45247		II	c. 1900	This pair of two-storey, semi-detached cottages in red brick was built to house workers at the nearby Bass Maltings complex, but has been converted into private residences. Each has a gabled front with a window on each floor and a door set back on the outer side of the house. Built in c. 1900, the houses were designed by A. Couchman and altered in the 20th century.	
Bass Maltings Cottages	8 Mareham Lane; TF 07179 45244		II	c. 1900	A red brick two-storey cottage converted into a residence, this building was built for workers at the Bass Maltings complex nearby and was designed by A. Couchman. The front has a projecting wing on its right side.	
Bristol Arcade	Market Place; TF 06810 45833		II	Late Georgian	Formerly the Bristol Arms Hotel, this late-Georgian, three-storey building spans five bays. Fronted in ashlar, its windows are framed in stone. It has rusticated quoins and embattled parapets; the central bay includes a pediment which houses the only top-storey window. The ground floor has been converted into shops and in the centre is an arched entrance to the Bristol Shopping Arcade which continues behind the building. The site had been occupied by The Angel Inn since the 16th century; it was renamed in 1826 to the Bristol Arms, after the Marquesses of Bristol who owned the manor.	
Drinking fountain	Market Place; TF 06796 45852		II	1874	A memorial to the landowner and politician Frederick Hervey, 2nd Marquess of Bristol (d. 1864), this drinking fountain is in stone, covered by a pyramid slate roof supported by granite columns with stone bases and capitals in the Gothic Revival style. Its construction was funded by donations from the marquess's tenants. The fountain was shut off in 1927 and sat disused until it was restored in 2019 by the Sleaford and District Civil Trust with the support of Heritage Lottery funding.	
Lock-up in north-east corner of Churchyard	Market Place; TF 06911 45936		II	By 1801	This is a square structure (made of rubble and a tile roof) which served as Sleaford's lock-up between 1801 and 1820, in the view of the register entry or from c. 1805 to 1824 in the view of the local historians Simon Pawley and Anthony Brand. It was a holding cell for persons being tried at the old Sessions House on the Market Place.	
War memorial	Market Place; TF 06838 45877		II	1922	Sleaford's war memorial was unveiled in a ceremony on 4 June 1922 by Mrs H. A. Peake (the wife of H. A. Peake of Westholme), a local dignitary whose three sons had been killed in the First World War. H. A. Peake's brother, Major G. H. Peake of Bawtry Hall, gave the address. A dedication by the parish priest, Canon Langdon, took place at the same time and there were readings by Rev. W. Calvert (of the Wesleyan Church), Rev. F. Greeves (of the Congregational Church) and Rev. G. A. Morgan (of the Primitive Methodists). The first wreaths were laid by J. T. Barnes (chairman of Sleaford Urban District Council) and Mr and Mrs H. A. Peake, followed by numerous local groups. The memorial was inscribed with the names of 134 Sleafordians who died in the First World War. The memorial was rededicated on 17 September 1950 by the Bishop of Grantham after 43 names of servicemen who died in the Second World War were added. Designed by Wilfrid Bond of Grantham, the memorial consists of a thin shaft ending in a rood cross atop a hexagonal stone base with niches containing the names of the deceased and three statues of warriors. Six steps lead up to the base. Remembrance Day commemorations normally take place at the war memorial.	
—	3 Market Street; TF 06798 45911		II	Early 18th century	A rendered two-storey building with a tiled roof. There are two dormers on the roof and three windows on the first floor; the ground floor has rustication and a modern door and window to the left and a shopfront to the right.	
—	4 Market Street; TF 06814 45891		II	18th century	Spanning three stories, 4 Market Street is a brick building with a stone plinth. There are two modern windows on each of the top floor and the first floor. On the ground floor, to the left there is a doorway with a fanlight, and on the right there is a 19th-century shop window fitted into a stone surround with an arched head.	
—	5 and 6 Market Street; TF 06814 45898		II	Mid 18th century (No 6)	Nos 5 to 6 span three storeys in red brick with a stone plinth; the tiling on the roof is modern. The upper two floors each have four windows; on the ground floor to the left is a coach arch spanning a single bay (No 5 is behind). Also on the ground is a tall door to No 6 approached by three steps.	
Former bank	7 Market Place; TF 06827 45910		II	Mid 19th century	Formerly the town's Trustee Savings Bank, No 7 Market Place is built of ashlar and spans two stories. Decorated with quoins, it has two windows on the upper floor overlooking the market place, while the ground floor has pilasters that separate each of its three windows and its door from each other. There is an angle quoin on the edge of the building with a doorway under a round arch (Note: When the building was listed in 1974, this was still used as a doorway, but photographs uploaded to the entry's web listing show that by 2024 this door had been converted into a window.) on the ground floor and a window above.	
—	8 and 9 Market Place; TF 06838 45916		II	Early 18th century	This is a red brick building across 2 stories with a pantile roof housing three dormers. There are four windows on the upper floor of No 8 and a "modern" ground floor. No 9 has a door and window on the ground floor.	
—	10 Market Place; TF 06874 45848		II	Early 19th century	On the corner of Carre Street and the Market Place, this three-storey building is rendered and has quoins on the left. The upper floors each have four windows; the ground floor has a 19th-century front consisting of arcaded windows either side of a door. It is thought the rendering conceals an older building.	
—	11 Market Place; TF 06867 45844		II	Early 20th century	An ashlar neo-Georgian building spanning three storeys, No 11 features a dormer in its tile roof, two windows on the upper floor, a bay window on the first floor and a shop front on the ground level.	
—	12 Market Place; TF 06859 45840		II	1853	A three-storey ashlar building with quoins spanning four windows; the ground floor door has a fanlight. The building was home to the Bissill family of surgeons from the 18th century. Rebuilt in 1853, it was still occupied by doctors in the mid-20th century.	
—	17 Market Place; TF 06836 45834		II	1821	Across three storeys, this ashlar building has quoins and spans three windows; the ground floor has a shopfront. There had been a draper's shop on this site from the mid 18th century and its upstairs had hosted theatrical productions around the turn of the 19th century; in 1821, it was rebuilt by Thomas Fawcett but continued to be draper's shop until 1907.	
—	20a Market Place; TF 06798 45832		II	Mid 19th century	A three-storey, red-brick building with a slate roof; a modern shopfront on the ground floor sits beneath two floors of two windows.	
—	21 and 22 Market Place; TF 06788 45830		II	Early 18th century with later extensions	Of three storeys, the ground floor is painted stone and the upper floors are brick; this building sits at the corner of the Market Place and Southgate. The left side of the market front is probably from the 20th century in a style matching the early-18th-century right side. The ground floor has arcading housing three windows and two doors; as of 2024, the door to the left and window to the right are blocked up. The Southgate side continues the early-18th-century building for three bays on the upper floors and was extended further southwards in the 19th century with brick upper floors; both parts share a ground floor in the same style with seven arched windows across the two phases.	
—	24 Market Place; TF 06767 45837		II	Late 17th century or early 18th century	A three-storey building, rendered with rusticated quoins. There is a modern shopfront on the ground floor and three windows on each of the upper floors.	
Carre's Charity	Northgate; TF 06782 46108		II	1857	Carre's Charity was founded in 1636, though the present building dates from the mid-19th century. Built to a Gothic Revival design, it is a coursed stone building across two storeys with a slate roof. There are three gabled porches projecting from the front, with mullion windows and balconies on the first floor. The ground floor includes arched doorways and a stone coat of arms. Adjacent to the plot is No 38 Northgate, a former savings bank, a one-storey building with a single window and door facing Northgate. The savings bank moved its operation to the Market Place in 1879, after which its premises were taken over by the Charity.	
Folly 3 metres to the west of numbers 6, 7 and 8 Parry's Court	Northgate; TF 06708 45916		II	c. 1850 with 14th-century elements	This coursed stone and rubble folly has ashlar decorations. Built by Charles Kirk in c. 1850, it incorporates 14th-century stonework probably collected by Kirk from other projects.	
Northgate House	Northgate; TF 06787 46034		II	Early 19th century	A two-storey brick building with a slate roof. There are three windows on the upper-floor frontage and a stone doorcase downstairs.	
Parry's Court	1 and 2 Northgate; TF 06747 45920		II	Late 18th century with c. 1850 changes	A pair of three-storey houses made of rubble with brick and ashlar decorations and slate roofs. The buildings are late-18th-century with additions, probably by Charles Kirk, from c. 1850.	
—	1, 3 and 3a Northgate; TF 06765 45873		II	Early to mid 19th century	A three-storey building in stone with a slate roof. There are quoins. The first floor windows are in moulded stone pediment surrounds. The ground floor contains shopfronts (No 1 being a 19th-century specimen, the rest being modern) and an arched carriageway to the right.	
Lloyds Bank	2 Northgate; TF 06792 45879		II	Late 17th century and 19th century	All in stone, the southern part dates to the late 17th century according to Historic England, or c. 1700 in the views of Pevsner and his colleagues and the local historian Edward Trollope. This southern section was a house for William Alvey, who built it on the site of an old inn called the Talbot; he lived at this house until his death in 1729. It was then occupied successively by Alvey Darwin and a surgeon. Described by Pevsner and his colleagues as "the most remarkable house in the town", it is Baroque with two storeys of three bays encased in bolection frames and a central tall doorway with a segmental porch. In 1803, the Peacock, Handley and Kirton Bank took over the premises; the company was purchased by Lloyds Bank in 1912. The two-storey northern part is neo-Baroque, grander than the southern section, and was completed by W. Watkins and Son in 1904 or 1905 for the bank. It has a broken pediment over a door surrounded by two rusticated blocked Ionic pillars and armorial bearings above each of the three tall windows to its left.	
Parry's Court	3, 4 and 5, Northgate; TF 06727 45921		II	c. 1850	Built by Charles Kirk, these three adjoining two-storey houses are in rubble with quoins and decoration in stone; they have slate roofs and span six bays on the upper floor. The doorways are under Tudor-style arches.	
National Westminster Bank	4 Northgate; TF 06785 45905		II	1844	A three-storey, yellow-brick building with a slate roof. The ground floor is in ashlar with pilasters, while the upper floors have two windows each on the Northgate side and four on the side fronting Market Street. It was built in 1844 by Joseph Smedley who had taken over Robert Thornhill's printing business three years earlier and ran it from this building; the business ran there until 1898, when it became a bank.	
—	5 Northgate; TF 06764 45887		II	18th century	A painted building with slate roofs, quoins, two windows upstairs and a modern shopfront on the ground floor	
—	6 and 8 Northgate; TF 06782 45917		II	Early 18th century	A two-storey painted brick building with a pantile roof containing three dormers. The ground floor has a modern shopfront and the upper floor has six windows.	
Parry's Court	6, 7 and 8 Northgate; TF 06715 45923		II	Mid 18th century and c. 1850	Parry's Court includes a former gate lodge and several houses. They are a mix of 18th-century buildings and additions by Charles Kirk dating to around 1850. Built of rubble with ashlar decorations and quoins, they have slate roofs and stone gables. The buildings are across two storeys and combine a variety of window types and decorative elements.	
The Packhorse Inn	7 Northgate; TF 06763 45898		II	18th century	Formerly the Lion Hotel, the Packhorse Inn is a three-storey brick building. Each floor has four windows, the ground floor also having a carriage entry to the left. The Lion Hotel had opened in 1821, taking over and rebuilding the White Lion Inn which occupied the site – itself formerly called the Packhorse Inn. After the hotel's closure, it was renovated in 2004 and reopened as a public house under the name Packhorse Inn.	
—	10 and 12 Northgate; TF 06781 45927		II	Mid 18th century	10 and 12 Northgate occupy a three-storey brick building with quoins and a pantile roof. The ground floor has modern shopfronts and the upper floors each have five windows.	
—	18, 19a, 19b and 19c Northgate; TF 06788 45946		II	Late 18th century	At the corner of Northgate and Church Lane, this is a three-storey building in red brick with quoins and a two-storey extension to the right of the Northgate frontage. The ground floor on the original building has a modern shopfront, while the extension has a doorway with Tuscan columns and an entablature. The Sleaford Rural District Council (and then its successor the East Kesteven Rural District Council) had its offices here from 1915 to 1964.	
—	19 Northgate; TF 06760 45920		II	18th or early 19th century	A rendered three-storey building with a slate roof. There is a 19th-century shopfront.	
—	21 Northgate; TF 06758 45927		II	c. 1850	To a French Gothic design, this two-storey building is made of ashlar and sandstone. There is an archway to the left, beside a projecting centre portion housing mullion windows. It has a steep slate roof. Built as a lodge house, it was constructed by Charles Kirk.	
—	23 Northgate; TF 06761 45941		II	c. 1802	A red-brick building with a slate roof spanning two storeys. There are three windows on the upper floor, two being bay windows. Downstairs is a Doric doorcase housing a panelled door and fanlight. The listing date it to the 18th century, though the local historians Anthony Brand and Simon Pawley have dated it to c. 1802, when it was built by the merchant and brewer John Brittain. A later occupant, William Bates, is thought to have named it Lindum House in c. 1870. It was home to Sleaford's Post Office from 1897 to 1933, continuing to host the telephone exchange until 1967.	
The Marquis of Granby public house and attached outbuildings	24 Northgate; TF 06788 46016		II	c. 1700 with later modifications	A coursed rubble two-storey public house with ashlar decorations and slate and tile roofing, there are stone chimneys on either of the building's gable ends. There is an arched doorway, mullion windows and an upstairs oriel window (the latter beneath a single centre gable). The rear has a single-storey window with doors for a garage and stable. The core dates to around 1700, but has late 18th-century changes and alternations made in c. 1860. In the early 19th century, it was a particularly notorious public house in a poor part of Sleaford; its extensive redevelopment around 1857 used building materials from the bakery which had been cleared to make way for the Corn Exchange off the market square at that time.	
27–29 and attached gateway to 25	27–29 Northgate; TF 06768 45958		II	c. 1830 with later changes	These former houses (Nos 27 and 29) are now used for commercial purposes. Spanning two storeys, they are built of coursed rubble with ashlar decorations and a tile roof with gables. The houses have arched doorways, mullion windows and stone chimney stacks. To the left of the building is an arched stone gateway to No 25 with Doric columns. No 25 is known as Woodford House, named for William Woodford, who owned it in the late 18th century; it was acquired by Thomas Fawcett and was sold in 1831 to Charles Rogers, a lawyer, who went into partnership with William Foster at 23 Northgate; as of 2024, their successors still operate from the building next door.	
—	31 Northgate; TF 06769 45971		II	19th century (probable) with medieval doorway	A two-storey building rendered with cement. The register entry considers it to be "of no interest" but for its four-centred doorway, which the list entry considers to be "medieval" and Pevsner and colleagues identify as 16th-century.	
—	35 Northgate; TF 06762 46045		II	Mid 18th century	This mid-18th-century stone house has a tile roof and modern bow windows. Its original doorway on the street front has been filled in; a moulded stone coat of arms sits above its former location. To the left of the frontage is an arched 19th-century doorway.	
—	37–41 Northgate; TF 06758 46062		II	Early 19th century	A range of three three-storey cottages in coursed stone with a tile roof. The group spans six windows on the upper floors and there are three doorways with fanlights and pilasters on the ground floor.	
Carre's Grammar School	40 Northgate; TF 06758 46140		II	1834 or 1835 (Note: The list entry says the building was completed in 1834, though the school's historian Charles Ellis gives an opening date for the new school of 1 September 1835.)	Founded in 1604, Carre's Grammar School fell into decline from the late 18th century and closed in 1816. Its trustees petitioned the Court of Chancery for a scheme to revive the school in 1828, which was approved in 1830; in 1834, the court granted funding to build a schoolhouse on Northgate, which opened for teaching in September 1835. Made of ashlar with a slate roof, the schoolhouse was built by Charles Kirk in a Tudor Gothic design. It spans three storeys with two gables on the front, three windows on the first floor and an arched doorway on the ground floor. There are one-storey buildings made of ashlar either side joined to the main schoolhouse by walls; each of the walls have a doorway in them. Red-brick extensions, added in 1904 and 1906, are included in the listing.	
—	43 Northgate; TF 06756 46073		II	18th century or early 19th century	A rendered three-storey building with a modern pantile roof	
—	51 and 53 Northgate; TF 06749 46096		II	Mid 19th century	A pair of cottages built of stone in a Gothic style and with a tile roof. Spanning seven windows on the upper floor, the ground floor has two sets of windows and a doorway for each cottage, with a central passageway between the two houses. The house is adorned with several depictions in stone of the coats of arms of the Carre family and others, and a datestone of 1719.	
Handley Memorial	Southgate; TF 06889 45553		II	1850	A memorial to the politician Henry Handley (1797–1846), this monument in stone takes the form of an Eleanor Cross. On a base is a statue of Handley by John Thomas sheltered by a Gothic pinnacled canopy, "spire-like" in the words of Edward Trollope. The design was by William Boyle of Birmingham and the construction was by W. M. Cooper of Derby.	
—	7 Southgate; TF 06789 45804		II	Early to mid 18th century	Across two storeys, this rendered building has a tile roof and a dormer window. Upstairs are two windows above a 19th-century shopfront and arched passageway to the left.	
—	9 Southgate; TF 06790 45793		II	Early 18th century	This two-storey building is rendered and has a slate roof. There are two windows upstairs. The ground floor has been cut into diagonally at the corner and the upper floor is supported by a column.	
—	10 and 12 Southgate; TF 06771 45784		II	18th century	A rendered building spanning three storeys with a pantile roof. The upper floors have three windows; the ground floor has a shopfront.	
—	11 Southgate; TF 06792 45784		II	18th century	This painted brick building spans two storeys and has a pantile roof with a single dormer window. The upper floor has two windows and there is a 19th-century shopfront on the ground floor.	
—	19 Southgate; TF 06814 45746		II	18th century	A brick, three-storey building with a modern shopfront	
—	23–27 Southgate; TF 06828 45719		II	Early to mid 19th century	A two-storey row of buildings in red brick. There are dormers in the pantile roof. No 27 is rendered and painted and has quoins. The ground floor comprises shopfronts and an arched passageway between Nos 25 and 27.	
—	28 and 30 Southgate; TF 06808 45703		II	Early to mid 19th century	A three-storey building in brick, No 28 has a modern shopfront and No 30 has a 19th-century shopfront.	
—	29 Southgate; TF 06833 45708		II	18th century	Rendered, this two-storey building has a pantile roof and a shop front on the ground floor.	
—	31 Southgate; TF 06837 45700		II	18th century	A painted and rendered two-storey building with a pantile roof. On the ground floor is a 19th-century shopfront and a carriage entry.	
White Hart Hotel	32 Southgate; TF 06812 45692		II	Early to mid 19th century	A three-storey brick building with four windows on each of the upper floors (two on the first floor being bay windows). On the ground floor is an arched carriage entry to the left with a datestone bearing 1691, and two windows and a door. In existence by the 1720s, it was originally the White Hind but merged with the adjacent White Horse public house at that time and was later renamed the White Hart; the 1691 datestone belonged to the White Horse. The hotel closed and has been an office since 2011.	
—	34 Southgate; TF 06817 45681		II	Early to mid 19th century	Spanning three storeys, this painted brick building has a modern shopfront beneath two floors of three windows.	
—	44 Southgate; TF 06832 45645		II	18th century	A rendered two-storey building with two windows on the upper above a modern shopfront	
Former windmill in yard to rear of 43 Southgate	43 Southgate; TF 06894 45685		II	c. 1810 alteration of 1796 original	A brick tower mill with no sails, Money's Mill had been built in 1796 by Henry Sutton on land to the rear of his bakery on Southgate. It was rebuilt or heavily altered c. 1810. With a height of 70 feet (21 m) and spanning eight stories, it was in operation until 1895 and then sat disused until it was restored in 1986. By the 2010s it housed a café. (Note: The mill sits in a car park called Money's Yard, the eastern part of which had been occupied by the warehouses and offices of the seed merchant John Money in the 19th century; these were cleared in 1979 to make way for the car park, as was the site of Gladstone's Yard to the west, a coal yard and series of tenements built c. 1823 and demolished in 1959.)	
Black Bull Inn	50 Southgate; TF 06839 45627		II	Early 19th century	A rendered two-storey building with two dormers. There is a datestone marked with 1689 and depicting bull baiting. Another datestone has the year 1791. There has been a pub on the site since at least 1661; it was known as the Bull (and later Black Bull) until 1995, when it became known as the Bull and Dog. The 1689 datestone includes the initials RBM, for Robert and Mary Buckberry, who owned it then.	
The Grapes public house	51 Southgate; TF 06863 45643		II	18th century	The ground floor of this 18th-century red-brick public house was rebuilt likely in the late 19th century. The building has three arcades spanning its full height with three windows on each of the upper floors.	
—	52 and 54 Southgate; TF 06845 45615		II	Early 18th century or earlier	A two-storey building made of coursed stone, there are modern shopfronts and a carriage entry on the ground floor. The upper floor has a 19th-century oriel window above the carriageway, and three other windows. There are two dormers in the pantile roof.	
—	53 and 53a Southgate; TF 06866 45635		II	18th century	A 19th-century shopfront and a carriage archway occupy the ground floor of this three-storey, painted brick building.	
—	55 and 57 Southgate; TF 06869 45627		II	18th century	Across three stories, this building is built in red brick with a pantile roof. It has three windows on each of the upper floors and a shopfront on the ground level.	
—	58 Southgate; TF 06851 45599		II	Early 19th century	A two-storey, slate-roofed building built of rubble, the upper floor has three windows and the ground floor has a modern shop front.	
—	59 and 61 Southgate; TF 06874 45618		II	18th century	Spanning three storeys, this building is built of rubble and has a pantile roof; the bottom floor has a modern shopfront, the middle floor has two windows, and the upper floor has three windows. There is a passageway to the left.	
—	60 Southgate; TF 06855 45591		II	Early 19th century (probable)	A two-storey building made of rubble with a slate roof, 60 Southgate has a modern shopfront on the ground floor and spans three bays on the upper floor.	
Kesteven and Sleaford High School	62 Southgate; TF 06860 45581		II	1842	Built by Charles Kirk for himself, 62 Southgate is in a Jacobethan style. The stone house spans three storeys with three gables, the central one being moulded. Between canted windows on either side, the central section projects forward with quoins and includes an arched doorway with pilasters. Iron rails atop a stone wall separate the house from the street, and steps lead up to the doorway. Two pre-Conquest stone fragments, likely 11th century, are inlaid into a wall. The house is dated by the list entry as "before 1850"; the local historians Anthony Brand and Simon Pawley date it to 1842. The building has been occupied by Kesteven and Sleaford High School since 1902.	
—	63 and 65 Southgate; TF 06881 45608		II	18th century	A three-storey building in stone with a modern roof. Each of the upper floors contains two windows; there is a modern shopfront on the ground level.	
The Ivy	64 Southgate; TF 06867 45562		II	18th century	Formerly the Nag's Head public house, this is a rendered three-storey building with a slate roof. On the ground floor are two bay windows and doorway with pilasters. The Nag's Head was operating at this site from at least 1784; it was renamed the Beer and Bean in 2013, but closed in 2017, reopening as The Ivy in 2021.	
Sleaford railway station	Station Road; TF 06794 45427		II	1857 (with extensions of 1882)	Opened in 1857, Sleaford railway station's original building is in ashlar and spans one-and-a-half storeys and four bays. There are four gables on the street side, each decorated and housing windows. The front has a projecting portion in the centre (originally incorporating an entrance); there is another projecting portion of the frontage to the right. On the ground floor are four windows, the one on the right being a large bay window. This first building was extended on either side in 1882 with brick wings, each with eight windows. The left side includes a staircase block leading to a wood and iron bridge over the tracks. The platforms are sheltered by wooden canopies supported by elaborate columns. There is a wooden building housing waiting rooms on one of the platforms.	
Bristol Farmhouse	Town Road, Quarrington; TF 05578 44391		II	Late 17th century	A stone house spanning two storeys, Bristol Farmhouse has a slate roof. There are two dormers on the front and a gabled projecting wing. Some of the windows are 17th-century, but others are 19th-century.	
Manor House and garden wall	Town Road, Quarrington; TF 05721 44474		II	Late 17th century	A two-storey house in coursed rubble with a slate roof. There are three dormers on the front and a canted bay window spanning both storeys. The listing includes the garden wall and notes that the house was "extensively" altered in the mid 19th century.	
Outbuildings to north of Bristol Farmhouse	Town Road; TF 05589 44423		II	Early 19th century	Made of coursed rubble, these outbuildings have a slate roof.	
—	22 and 24 Town Road, Quarrington; TF 05418 44419		II	Mid-19th century	A two-storey building in coursed rubble with a tile roof and brick quoins. The front facing the road has two gables each with a window on both floor. These houses were previously numbered 12 and 13.	
—	32 and 34 Town Road, Quarrington; TF 05504 44430		II	1842	A pair of two-storey cottages made of rubble with quoins and tile roofs. There are two gabled wings facing the road. These houses were previously numbered 8 and 9.	
—	2–10 Water Gate; TF 06709 45815		II	Mid 18th century	A range of three-storey brick buildings with pantile roofs. No 2 was the Rose and Crown public house until it closed in 2015; it reopened in 2018 under new owners as the Watergate Yard public house. It is rendered and has a flat-arched entry way to a rear yard. The Rose and Crown had occupied that site since at least 1835, backing onto a pub of the same name on Westgate. No 10 has a separate design from the rest of the range and an arched passageway leading to the rear.	
—	2 Westgate; TF 06757 45866		II	18th century	This three-storey building is fronted in coursed stone with brick sides. It spans three storeys and has two windows above a shop front.	
—	4 Westgate; TF 06753 45865		II	18th century	This two-storey, stone-coursed building has a pantile roof, two windows above a shop front, and an arched passage to its left.	
—	6 Westgate; TF 06746 45867		II	Late 18th century	This three-storey, brick building has a pantile roof and two windows above a shop front.	
—	8 Westgate; TF 06737 45866		II	18th century	A three-storey, brick building	
—	10 Westgate; TF 06730 45865		II	18th century	This is a three-story, rendered building with brick sides; there are 3 windows on each of the middle and ground floors (the middle windows being filled in) above a modern ground floor.	
—	12 and 14 Westgate; TF 06720 45863		II	Early 18th century	This is a pair of terraced buildings across two storeys; along the roof are three dormers. No 12 is rendered and has two modern canted oriel windows on the first floor and a modern ground floor. No 14's brickwork is painted and has two windows on the first floor and a 19th-century shop front on the ground floor.	
—	15 Westgate; TF 06718 45850		II	Early 19th century	15 Westgate is a three-storeyed brick building with three windows upstairs, above a 19th-century shopfront and an arched passage entry on the right side of the building.	
—	16 and 18 Westgate; TF 06710 45864		II	18th century	A painted brick pair of buildings, Nos 16 and 18 span two storeys and have pantile roofs with a dormer on each building. There is one window on each of the upper floors above a 19th-century shopfront to No 16 and a modern ground floor front to No 18.	
—	17 Westgate; TF 06708 45850		II	18th century	A painted brick building spanning two stories, 17 Westgate's pantile roof incorporates two dormers. Its upper floor has two windows, while the ground floor has a 19th-century shop front.	
—	17A Westgate; TF 06701 45849		II	18th century	This is a three-storey brick building with two windows and a passage on the left side. When it was listed in 1974, there was a sign on the building indicating that it used to be a temperance hotel.	
—	20 Westgate; TF 06700 45864		II	Early to mid 19th century	Across two-storeys, this painted brick building has two windows on the upper floor above a modern shop front with a window on the gable end.	
—	20b Westgate; TF 06694 45865		II	Early 19th century	A neo-Gothic design in red brick with a slate roof, 20b Westgate spans two storeys. The front facing the road has an arched Gothic window upstairs and a Georgian-style window downstairs; the side has two windows on each floor and an arched doorway on the ground level, with a single-storey extension continuing to the rear.	
—	22 Westgate; TF 06687 45912		II	Early 19th century	Spanning two storeys, 22 Westgate is a brick house with a slate roof. There is a bay window and a doorway with pilasters surrounding it on the ground floor, and three windows upstairs.	
—	23 Westgate; TF 06655 45840		II	18th century	A two-storey building in painted brick, the lower floor has a single window and a doorway with a fanlight and a pilastered surround; the upper floor has two windows.	
Westgate House	25 Westgate; TF 06638 45832		II	Late 18th century to mid 19th century	The building is of the late 18th or early 19th century, but the side facing the street is mid-19th century. Of three storeys, the rear (made of ashlar) spans five bays across its upper two floors above a ground floor composed of two bow windows either side of a doorway with Tuscan columns and steps leading down to the house's gardens. On the street front, there are three windows on the upper floors; a central doorway sits between two windows on the ground level. There is a rendered two-storey wing to the left of the rear frontage. The house was privately occupied until 1954 (Note: According to a report in the Sleaford Standard, the building was owned by William Hungerford Holdich (d. 1880), a partner in Messrs W. H. and C. W. Holdich, a firm of solicitors. It was then occupied by William Henry Knight (1832–1886), a partner in Kirk and Parry who managed the firm after Parry's death in 1879; His widow Eliza died at the house in 1906. The house was subsequently occupied by Dr Charles Woods from 1909 to 1919, John T. Sharpe from 1919 to 1920, Dr John Cooper from 1920 to 1933, and then Dr Joseph Elison Eadham from 1933 until his death in 1953; Eadham's son sold it to Sleaford Urban District Council in 1954.) before it was acquired by Sleaford Urban District Council (UDC); they used it as their offices and hosted their council chamber there until the UDC was abolished in 1974, when the building was taken over by North Kesteven District Council and used as their register office. In 1985, Anglian Water purchased the house. The house has been in private ownership since Anglian Water sold it in 1995. (Note: Anglian Water sold it to Estate Computer Systems in 1995; MRI Software (ECS's successor company) departed in 2021 (Note: ECS merged with several companies in 2007 to form Qube, which was bought by MRI Software in 2017.) and Holton Sleaford Independent School, a private school, has occupied the building from 2022.)	
—	28 Westgate; TF 06673 45863		II	18th century	A brick building with a pantile roof, this house has two windows facing the street on the upper floor and two windows on the ground floor between a door with a pilastered surround in a Georgian style.	
—	30 and 32 Westgate; TF 06663 45861		II	18th century	A terraced pair of brick buildings across three storeys with a pantile roof and a stone plinth along the base. Each has shop front on the ground level and a window facing the street on the upper floor. There is a passageway on the west side of No 32.	
—	34 Westgate; TF 06652 45859		II	Early 19th century	A brick house spanning three storeys, the middle and upper floors each have three windows; the ground floor has two windows either side of doorway with a fanlight. When the building was listed in 1974, there was a shopfront on the right side of the ground floor, but this had been replaced by a window by the time No 34 was photographed for English Heritage in 2001.	
—	38 Westgate; TF 06642 45858		II	Early 18th century	This two-storey building is rendered with a modern roof. On the front, there are two ground-floor bow windows between a centre door which is under a pediment. On the upper floor, there are two windows.	
—	40 and 42 Westgate; TF 06633 45857		II	1802	These 18th-century brick buildings span three storeys and each include one bay on the middle and upper floors. Their fronts have been rendered and include a 19th-century ground-floor extension with shop windows and pointed arches in front of their doorways. In the middle of the pair, there is an arched passage to the rear. The building was built by Thomas Fawcett in 1802 and served as the Wesleyan Methodist Chapel until 1846.	
—	54 Westgate; TF 06569 45842		II	1825	A playhouse, this coursed-stone, two-storey building dates to the early 19th century. It has a Welsh slate roof. On the first floor, there are two windows to the front of the building and four to the side. Travelling actors are known to have performed in Sleaford in the late 18th century and eventually put on regular shows. In 1825, the comedian Joseph Smedley built this playhouse, though performances were limited to a few weeks a year and the building was let for storage for the rest of the time. Smedley's retirement in 1841 was followed by a period of declining fortunes for the theatre (possibly connected to Westgate's development as a slum district). It closed in 1855, after which Kirk and Parry converted the building into Sleaford's National School (opened in 1856); the now-demolished Corn Exchange opposite the Market Place (which opened in the 1850s) became host to the town's theatrical productions. The school, catering for infants, eventually closed and the building served as a library and an office building. In 1994, it was purchased by Sleaford Little Theatre, who converted it for use as a theatre. Having reopened in 2000, it continues to host regular productions.	
