= Grade II* listed buildings in North Kesteven =

There are over 20,000 Grade II* listed buildings in England. This page is a list of these buildings in the district of North Kesteven in Lincolnshire.

== North Kesteven ==
Name	Location	Type	Completed (Note: The date given is the date used by Historic England as significant for the initial building or that of an important part in the structure's description.)	Date designated	Grid ref. (Note: The grid reference is based on the British national grid reference system, sometimes known as OSGB36, used by the Ordnance Survey.) Geo-coordinates	Entry number (Note: The "List Entry Number" is a unique number assigned to each listed building and scheduled monument by Historic England.)	Image
Church of St Oswald	Howell, Asgarby and Howell, North Kesteven	Cross	10th century	1 February 1967	TF1350746256; 53°00′06″N 0°18′36″W	1061833	Church of St Oswald More images
Churchyard Cross in the Churchyard of St Oswald's Church	Howell, Asgarby and Howell, North Kesteven	Cross	15th century	12 October 1988	TF1350646243; 53°00′05″N 0°18′36″W	1168431	Churchyard Cross in the Churchyard of St Oswald's Church More images
Church of St Hybald	Ashby de la Launde and Bloxholm, North Kesteven	Parish Church	12th century	1 February 1967	TF0551054754; 53°04′47″N 0°25′35″W	1307159	Church of St Hybald More images
Parish Church of St Mary and All Saints	Aswarby and Swarby, North Kesteven	Church	13th century	1 February 1967	TF0470740568; 52°57′08″N 0°26′35″W	1147542	Parish Church of St Mary and All Saints More images
Church of St Peter	Aubourn and Haddington, North Kesteven	Parish Church	13th century	23 August 1967	SK9276762787; 53°09′15″N 0°36′51″W	1360541	Church of St Peter More images
Parish Church of St Thomas a Becket	Aunsby, Aunsby and Dembleby, North Kesteven	Church	12th century	1 February 1967	TF0447038838; 52°56′12″N 0°26′49″W	1061790	Parish Church of St Thomas a Becket More images
Church of St Michael and All Angels	Bassingham, North Kesteven	Parish Church	11th century	23 August 1967	SK9080659732; 53°07′37″N 0°38′40″W	1061923	Church of St Michael and All Angels More images
Church of St Oswald	Blankney, North Kesteven	Parish Church	12th century	1 February 1967	TF0682660003; 53°07′35″N 0°24′18″W	1064285	Church of St Oswald More images
Church of All Saints	Branston and Mere, North Kesteven	Schoolroom	1836	23 August 1967	TF0213067313; 53°11′35″N 0°28′22″W	1360529	Church of All Saints More images
Lister Place, Gates and Gatepiers	Brant Broughton and Stragglethorpe, North Kesteven	House	c. 1700	17 June 1986	SK9157854087; 53°04′34″N 0°38′04″W	1061928	Upload Photo
Quaker Meeting House and Attached Stable	Brant Broughton, Brant Broughton and Stragglethorpe	Meeting Hall	1701	17 June 1986	SK9165454220; 53°04′38″N 0°38′00″W	1061898	Quaker Meeting House and Attached Stable More images
The Priory, Gates and Gatepiers	Brant Broughton and Stragglethorpe, North Kesteven	House	1658	23 August 1967	SK9153554027; 53°04′32″N 0°38′06″W	1360527	Upload Photo
Coleby Hall	Coleby, North Kesteven	House	17th century	19 November 1951	SK9732260768; 53°08′07″N 0°32′48″W	1061979	Upload Photo
College Hall, Royal Air Force College Cranwell	Cranwell and Byard's Leap, North Kesteven	Military College	1929-33	7 December 1987	SK9997349919; 53°02′14″N 0°30′38″W	1254079	College Hall, Royal Air Force College Cranwell More images
Culverthorpe Temple	Culverthorpe Park, Culverthorpe and Kelby, North Kesteven	Temple	c. 1740	11 January 1990	TF0231540456; 52°57′06″N 0°28′43″W	1308442	Culverthorpe Temple
The Garages to Culverthorpe Hall	Culverthorpe and Kelby, North Kesteven	Service Wing	Late 17th century	23 November 1951	TF0206240354; 52°57′03″N 0°28′56″W	1360582	The Garages to Culverthorpe Hall
The Stables to Culverthorpe Hall	Culverthorpe Park, Culverthorpe and Kelby, North Kesteven	Stable	Late 17th century	23 November 1951	TF0197440347; 52°57′03″N 0°29′01″W	1147621	Upload Photo
Gatehouse to Doddington Hall	Doddington and Whisby, North Kesteven	Gatehouse	16th century	22 December 1983	SK9005470080; 53°13′13″N 0°39′10″W	1360505	Gatehouse to Doddington Hall More images
Walls and Gates to Doddington Hall	Doddington and Whisby, North Kesteven	Gate Pier	16th century	22 December 1983	SK8994370086; 53°13′13″N 0°39′16″W	1061959	Upload Photo
Folly Facade to The Jungle	Eagle and Swinethorpe, North Kesteven	Farmhouse	c. 1820	7 September 1977	SK8835268597; 53°12′26″N 0°40′43″W	1061998	Folly Facade to The Jungle More images
Church of St Mary	Evedon, Ewerby and Evedon, North Kesteven	Parish Church	13th century	1 February 1967	TF0928347594; 53°00′52″N 0°22′21″W	1168557	Church of St Mary More images
All Saints Parish Church	Harmston, North Kesteven	Parish Church	11th century	23 August 1967	SK9727162275; 53°08′55″N 0°32′49″W	1164892	All Saints Parish Church More images
Harmston Hall	Harmston, North Kesteven	Country House	1710	23 August 1967	SK9699462141; 53°08′51″N 0°33′04″W	1317567	Harmston Hall More images
Manor Farmhouse	Helpringham, North Kesteven	House	Late 17th century	12 October 1988	TF1400740730; 52°57′07″N 0°18′16″W	1061814	Upload Photo
Church of St Denys	Kirkby la Thorpe, North Kesteven	Parish Church	12th century	1 February 1967	TF0990746092; 53°00′03″N 0°21′49″W	1360592	Church of St Denys More images
The Grange	Kirkby la Thorpe, North Kesteven	House	c. 1620	1 February 1967	TF0979146190; 53°00′06″N 0°21′55″W	1168986	Upload Photo
Leadenham House	Leadenham, North Kesteven	Country House	1790-9	23 August 1967	SK9493651823; 53°03′19″N 0°35′06″W	1061877	Leadenham House More images
The Old Hall	Leadenham, North Kesteven	Country House	c. 1600	23 August 1967	SK9518452501; 53°03′41″N 0°34′52″W	1061869	Upload Photo
The Manor	Leasingham, North Kesteven	Country House	c. 1750	1 February 1967	TF0572648348; 53°01′19″N 0°25′31″W	1261371	Upload Photo
Church of St Wilfred	Metheringham, North Kesteven	Parish Church	12th century	2 May 1985	TF0701761288; 53°08′17″N 0°24′06″W	1165640	Church of St Wilfred More images
Church of All Saints	Nocton, North Kesteven	Parish Church	1862	23 August 1967	TF0606764125; 53°09′49″N 0°24′54″W	1061911	Church of All Saints More images
Field House and Wall to Nocton Hall	Nocton, North Kesteven	House	Late 18th century	4 December 1979	TF0594664261; 53°09′54″N 0°25′00″W	1061910	Upload Photo
Rowston Manor	Rowston, North Kesteven	House	1741	1 February 1967	TF0835656408; 53°05′38″N 0°23′00″W	1280659	Upload Photo
Church of the Holy Cross	Scopwick, North Kesteven	Parish Church	12th century	1 February 1967	TF0698558056; 53°06′32″N 0°24′12″W	1064299	Church of the Holy Cross More images
Cross Base	Silk Willoughby, North Kesteven	Cross	14th century	1 February 1967	TF0565042969; 52°58′25″N 0°25′41″W	1360612	Cross Base More images
Carre's Hospital. Pump and Sun-dial in the Forecourt and Wall Along Carre Street	Sleaford, North Kesteven	House	1841-1846	16 July 1949	TF0691745851; 52°59′58″N 0°24′30″W	1062145	Carre's Hospital. Pump and Sun-dial in the Forecourt and Wall Along Carre Street More images
Church of St Botolph	Quarrington, Sleaford, North Kesteven	Church	Late 12th century	16 July 1949	TF0541144468; 52°59′14″N 0°25′52″W	1360452	Church of St Botolph More images
Manor House, Rhodes House, Wall and Gate Piers to Cobbled Yard and Garden Wall to No 33	Sleaford, North Kesteven	House	16th century	16 July 1949	TF0676846001; 53°00′03″N 0°24′38″W	1168499	Manor House, Rhodes House, Wall and Gate Piers to Cobbled Yard and Garden Wall to No 33 More images
Town Hall (Sessions House)	Sleaford, North Kesteven	Town Hall	1831	16 July 1949	TF0679545870; 52°59′58″N 0°24′36″W	1307024	Town Hall (Sessions House) More images
Vicarage	Sleaford, North Kesteven	Vicarage	15th century	16 July 1949	TF0686845924; 53°00′00″N 0°24′32″W	1168389	Vicarage More images
Church of St Michael	South Hykeham, North Kesteven	Parish Church	13th century	22 December 1983	SK9368564539; 53°10′11″N 0°36′00″W	1061957	Church of St Michael More images
Church of St Mary and All Saints	South Kyme, North Kesteven	Parish Church	1890	1 February 1967	TF1685449788; 53°01′57″N 0°15′32″W	1061749	Church of St Mary and All Saints More images
Church of All Saints	Swinderby, North Kesteven	Church	12th century	23 August 1967	SK8690263179; 53°09′31″N 0°42′06″W	1165316	Church of All Saints More images
Church of St Germain	Thurlby, North Kesteven	Parish Church	11th century	23 August 1967	SK9089561713; 53°08′41″N 0°38′33″W	1061972	Church of St Germain More images
Church of St Andrew	Timberland, North Kesteven	Church	C20	1 February 1967	TF1217058242; 53°06′34″N 0°19′33″W	1205586	Church of St Andrew More images
Church of St John the Evangelist	Washingborough, North Kesteven	Parish Church	13th century	23 August 1967	TF0185270632; 53°13′23″N 0°28′33″W	1205149	Church of St John the Evangelist More images
Welbourn Manor	Welbourn, North Kesteven	Country House	Early 14th century	19 November 1951	SK9663753982; 53°04′28″N 0°33′32″W	1360567	Welbourn Manor More images
Wellingore Hall and attached R.C. Church of St Augustine	Wellingore, North Kesteven	Apartment	c. 1760	23 August 1967	SK9831256533; 53°05′49″N 0°32′00″W	1147748	Wellingore Hall and attached R.C. Church of St Augustine More images
