= Westholme =

Westholme may refer to:

Places

- Westholme, British Columbia, a town in Canada
- Westholme, Somerset, a settlement near Pilton, Somerset, England

Other

- Westholme House, an historic building in Sleaford, England
- Westholme School, a school in Blackburn, England
