= North Kesteven Council Offices =

Municipal building in Sleaford, England

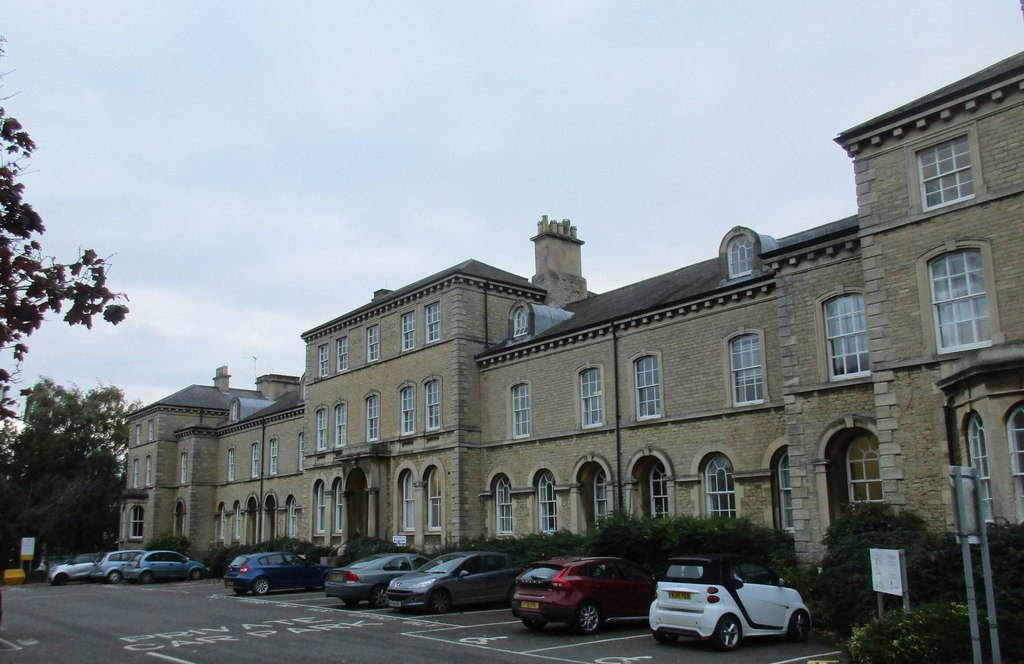
- North Kesteven Council Offices

- Shown in Lincolnshire
- 52.9999°N 0.4056°W
- Location: Eastgate, Sleaford

History
- Built: 1856

Site notes
- Architect: Kirk and Parry
- Architectural style: Italianate style

Listed Building – Grade II
- Official name: Lafford Terrace, Eastgate
- Designated: 14 November 1974
- Reference no.: 1062147

The North Kesteven Council Offices, formerly County Offices, Sleaford, is a municipal structure in Lafford Terrace, Sleaford, Lincolnshire, England. The structure, which is currently used as the headquarters of North Kesteven District Council, is a Grade II listed building.

== History ==
The structure was originally commissioned as a row of houses known as Lafford Terrace. The name chosen for the terrace recalled the Rural Deanery of Lafford which had surrounded Sleaford. The terrace was designed by the local firm of architects, Kirk and Parry, in the Italianate style, built in coursed stone with ashlar dressings and was completed in 1856.

The design involved a symmetrical main frontage of 23 bays facing southwest with the central block and end blocks projected forward as pavilions. The central block of five bays featured a portico formed by Doric order columns supporting arches with keystones and an entablature. The end blocks of two bays each featured bay windows on the ground floor, and the bays just before the end blocks, which were slightly projected forward, featured round headed doorways. The remainder of the building was fenestrated with round headed windows with architraves and keystones on the ground floor, with segmentally headed windows with architraves and keystones on the first floor and, in the case of the central block and the end blocks which incorporated an extra floor, with square headed windows with architraves on the second floor. At roof level, the connecting blocks of six bays each featured round headed dormer windows, and the whole structure was surmounted by a modillioned cornice and a hip roof.

Residents in the terrace included Mary Wedd, the first mistress of Sleaford Art School, who lived at No. 6 Lafford Terrace. Following the implementation of the Local Government Act 1888, which established county councils in every county, it became necessary to find offices and a meeting place for Kesteven County Council. The county council initially established its offices in Jermyn Street and council meetings were held on an alternating basis between venues in Grantham and Sleaford. However, by the mid-1920s, councillors found this arrangement unsatisfactory and, in 1925 bought Lafford Terrace for conversion and use as its permanent headquarters. The building was offices rather than the council's meeting place; plans to add a council chamber to the building were considered but not pursued, and council meetings continued to be held alternately at Grantham Guildhall and Sessions House, Sleaford throughout the council's existence.

The county council was abolished when the newly-formed Lincolnshire County Council was formed at the County Offices in Lincoln in 1974. The building then became the offices of North Kesteven District Council, who shortly afterwards added a council chamber to the building.
