= Bass Maltings, Sleaford =

Sleaford, North Kesteven, Lincolnshire, England

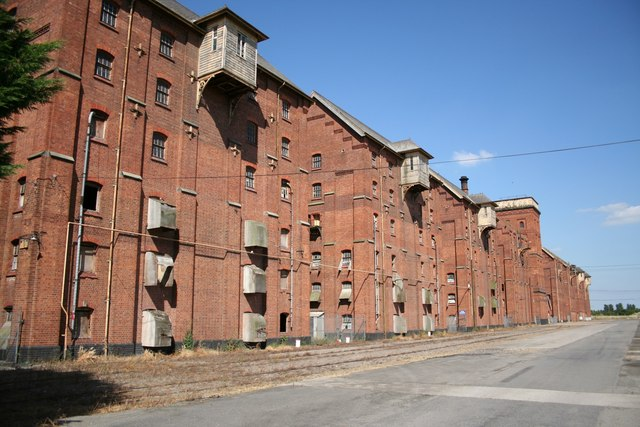

- Location within Lincolnshire
- 52.9939°N 0.4007°W
- Location: Sleaford, Lincolnshire, England
- OS grid reference: TF 07444 45255

History
- Built: 1901–1907

Site notes
- Architect: Herbert A. Couchman

Listed Building – Grade II*
- Official name: Former maltings of Bass Industrial Estate
- Designated: 14 November 1974
- Reference no.: 1062154

The Bass Maltings in Sleaford, England are a large group of eight disused malt houses originally owned by the Bass Brewery of Burton upon Trent. Constructed between 1901 and 1907 to Herbert A. Couchman's design, the maltings are the largest group of malt houses in England; they have been designated Grade II* on the National Heritage List for England, recognising them as "particularly important ... of more than special interest."

Part of the predominantly agricultural county of Lincolnshire, the Sleaford area was a major producer of barley in the 1880s. When germinated and dried to form malt, barley forms a key ingredient in the production of beer. Along with the town's railway links, this attracted the Bass brewery company to the town. The use of more efficient techniques at Bass's other plant led to the closure of Sleaford's maltings in 1959. Despite being used to rear poultry in the late 20th century, the buildings have not been fully occupied since Bass left and a fire in 1976 caused severe damage to three of the malthouses. Derelict since the 1990s, proposals to convert the buildings into office, retail and residential space were put on hold in early 2015 after lengthy delays over planning permission and the withdrawal of a major investor.

== History ==
=== Industry and vacancy ===
In the late-19th century, the Sleaford area was a major barley producer and by the 1880s, Sleaford was a stop on railway lines connecting the town to Boston, Grantham, Bourne, Spalding and Lincoln. These qualities made the town desirable for the production of malt, a crucial ingredient in beer production. The brewers Bass, Ratcliffe and Gretton Ltd were attracted to the town and in 1880 proposed a new malting complex there, which would consolidate malting closer to the barley source and reduce costs by up-scaling production. Drilling in 1892 revealed suitable artesian water sources under Sleaford; plans were submitted nine years later and over 13 acres of land off Mareham Lane was purchased; work started in 1901 and was complete by 1907.

The company ran the complex at full capacity until after the Second World War; however, in the 1950s, Bass installed new and more efficient pneumatic malting systems at their original Burton-on-Trent plant, making the Sleaford complex redundant and paving the way for its closure in 1959. Vacant space was let to businesses, but the enormous complex was only ever partially occupied after Bass left. Vulnerable to damage and poorly maintained, fires started in 1969 and 1976, the latter resulting in major damage to three of the malthouses. Some of the space was used for chicken-rearing by G. W. Padley (Property) Ltd. from 1973 into the 1990s.

=== Regeneration ===
A regeneration scheme was announced in 2004; supported by the Phoenix Trust, the maltings would be converted into residential, retail and business space. Public consultation took place in 2005 and 2006, with around 90% of participants supporting regeneration and three-quarters asking for a cinema and entertainment complex. Lincolnshire Enterprise granted £200,000 towards the regeneration scheme and the Gladedale Group came forward to develop the project. Over the next three years, they worked with the Prince's Regeneration Trust to draw up plans for the site's regeneration which protected the historic exterior. In 2009, their proposals were submitted for planning permission. North Kesteven District Council approved the £50 million development in 2011; Tesco was also granted permission to build a £20 million supermarket as part of the redevelopment. The maltings would be converted into retail and office space, alongside 220 apartments.

However, in 2012, Sleaford Town Council recommended refusal of planning permission for a link road connecting Boston Road to the site because of "concerns about closing a level crossing and the loss of trees" at the Boston Road Recreation Ground. After a lengthy stalemate, the District Council served a compulsory purchase order on the site in 2014, but Tesco announced early the following year that it would no longer be investing in the maltings complex following a series of financial setbacks to the company. Although Gladedale (by then known as Avant Homes) announced its commitment to converting parts of the site to residential use, the leader of North Kesteven District Council, Marion Brighton, stated that the plans were "effectively on hold" following the withdrawal of Tesco.

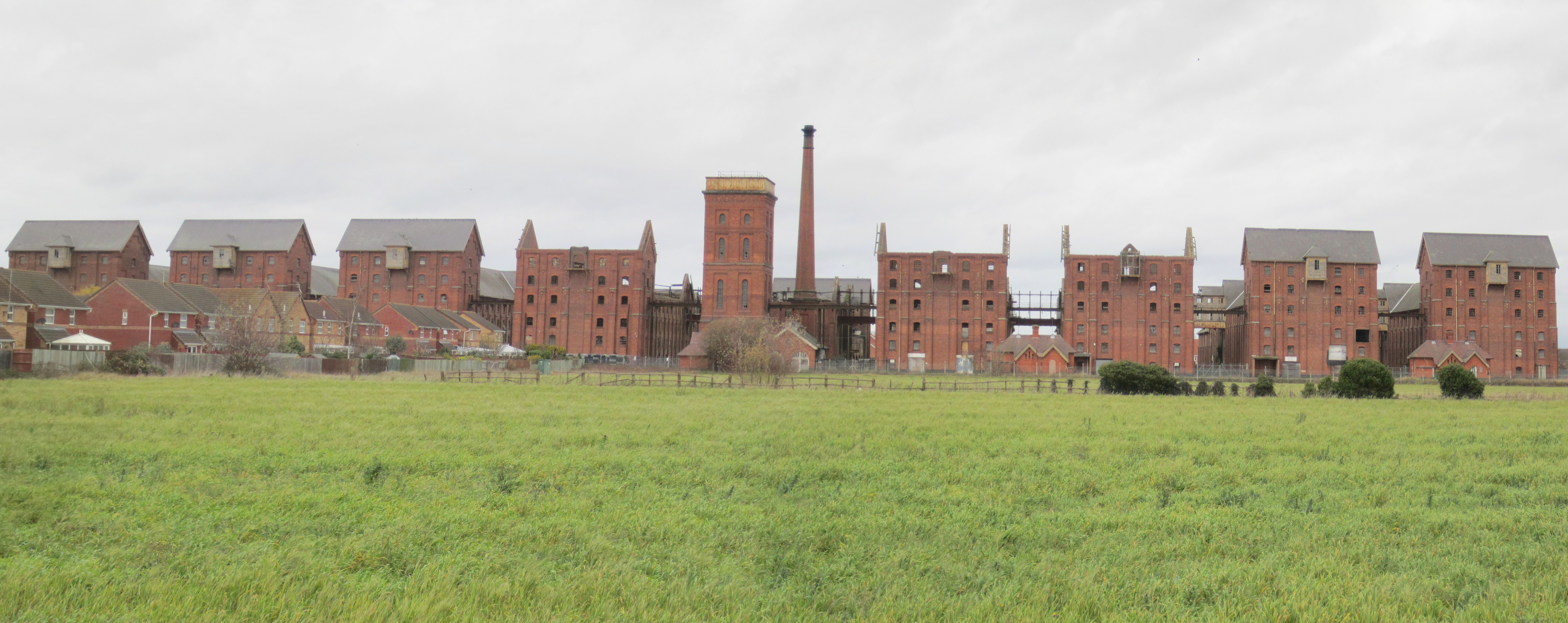
The maltings from the south

== Architecture ==
The maltings were constructed to designs by Herbert A. Couchman, Bass & Co.'s chief engineer. Built in red brick with Welsh slate roofing, the complex follows a rectangular plan along an east–west orientation: a central four-storey water tower is flanked by four malthouses. Behind the tower is a tall, octagonal chimney. The malthouses are identical in design and layout; barley was fed into a granary section, before being moved onto the germination floors and eventually transported to one of the twin kilns, where malting took place. Their southern fronts consisted of a six-storey building of five bays with a gable spanning three windows that faces the other ranges. Projecting northwards is a ten-bay section of four-storeys which formed the germination floors.

With a frontage of nearly 1,000 ft and a total area of 50,000 sq ft, the maltings complex is believed to be largest of its type in England; the architectural historians Sir Nikolaus Pevsner and John Harris commented that "for sheer impressiveness little in English industrial architecture can equal the scale of this building. In 1974, it was recorded in the National Heritage List for England as a designated Grade II* listed building in recognition of its importance as an example of a large-scale industrial malting complex in which "considerations of form, massing, symmetry and scale have produced a design of high aesthetic quality combined with clear functional expression"; it also represents the importance of the English brewing industry in the late-19th and early 20th centuries and large-scale malting at its peak. Owing to its derelict state, the building was also placed on English Heritage's "Heritage at Risk" register in 2011.

There are five workers' cottages along the path from Mareham Lane to the industrial site; each are Grade II listed. The complex's offices, storage depot, weigh offices, cartsheds, gateways, walls and mess rooms are also listed at the same grade.

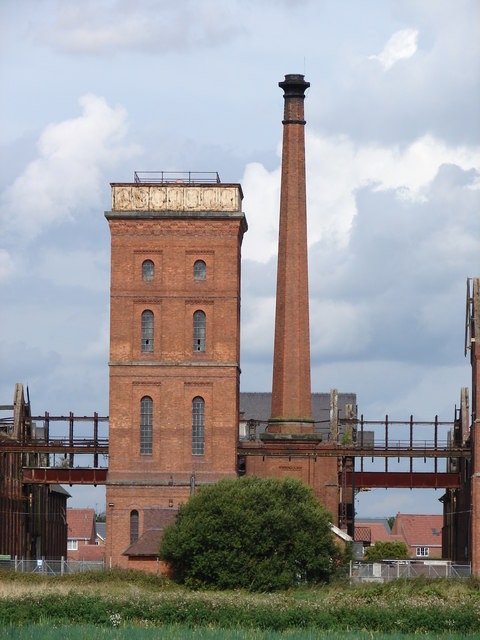
The water tower at the Bass Maltings

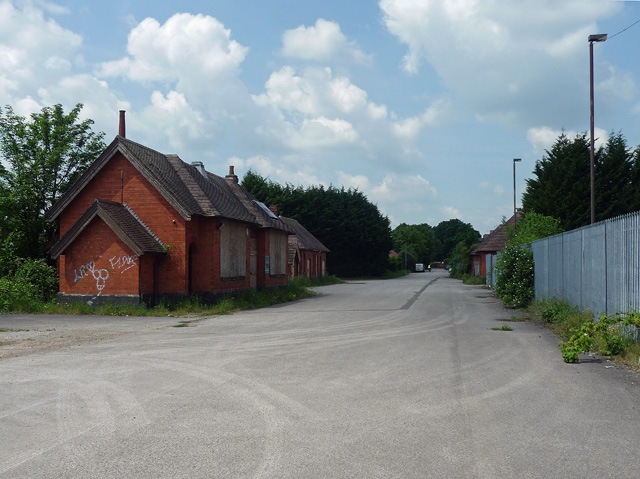
Number 5 Mess Room, a listed building on the site (the Weigh Offices, also listed, are behind the Mess Room)

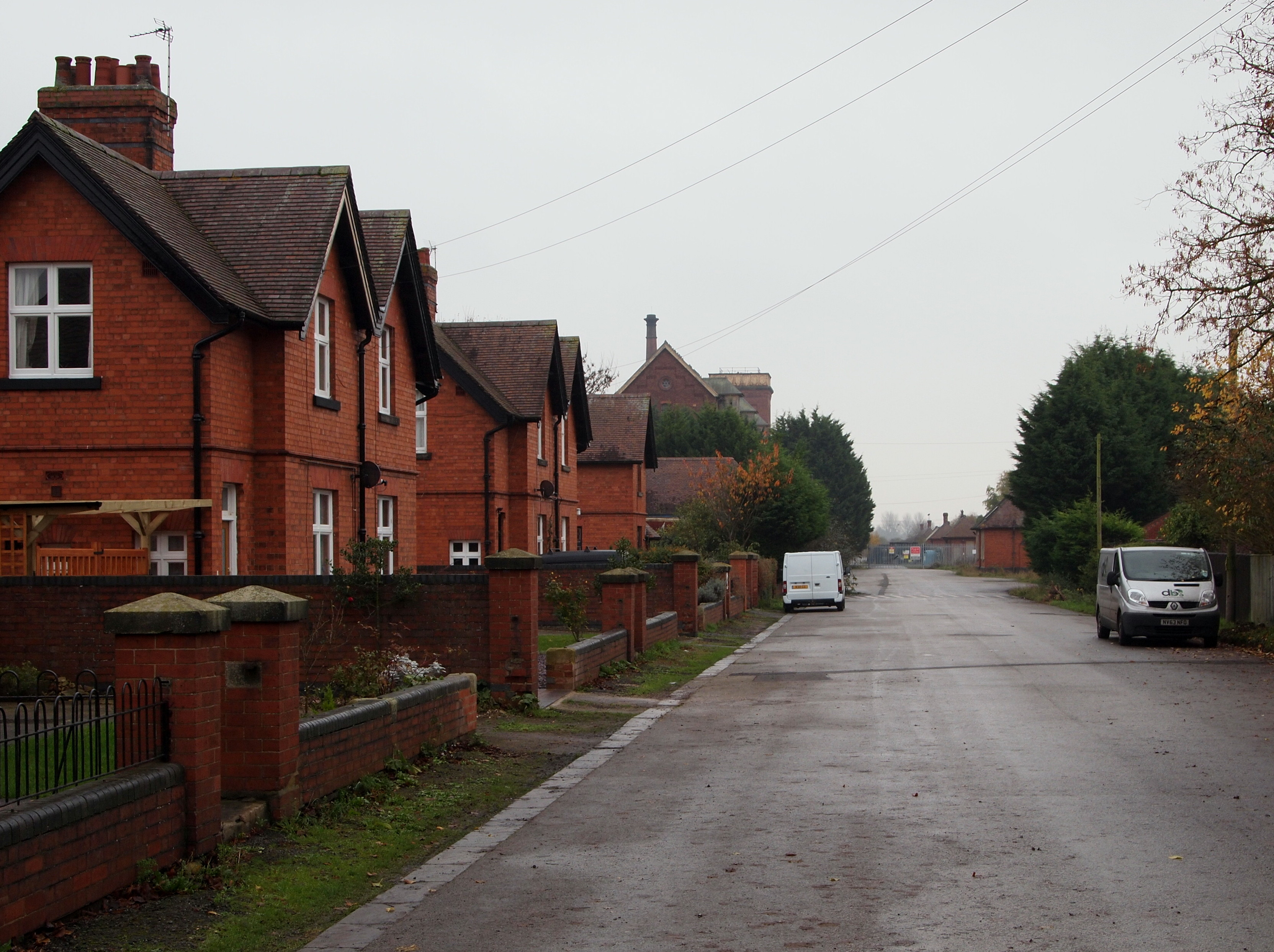
Bass Cottages, lining the road to the maltings. These formerly housed workers employed at the facility and are now listed buildings.

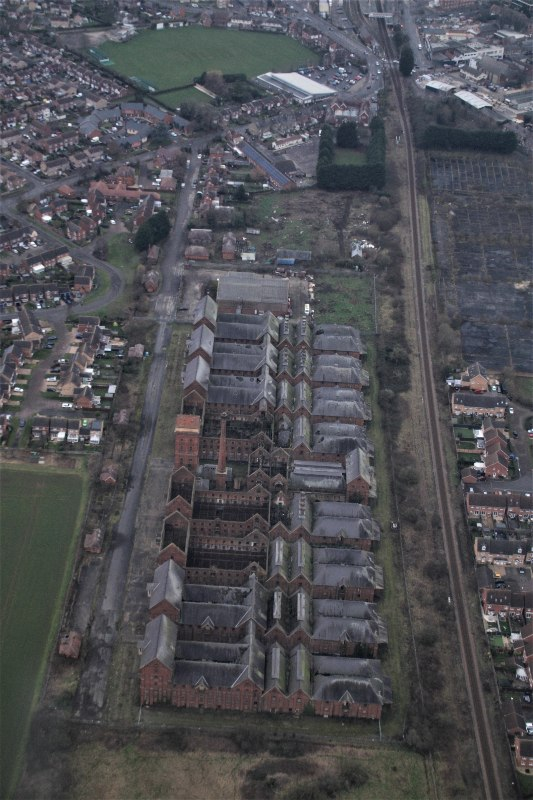
The site viewed east to west

== See also ==
- Listed buildings in Sleaford
