= Westholme House =

Grade II listed building in the United kingdom

Coordinates: 53°00′00″N 0°24′53″W

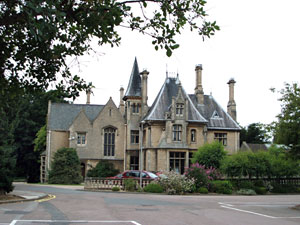
- The east front of Westholme House

- Location within Lincolnshire
- Location: Sleaford, Lincolnshire, England
- OS grid reference: TF 06477 45920

History
- Built: c. 1849

Listed Building – Grade II
- Official name: Westholme
- Designated: 14 November 1974
- Reference no.: 1062153

Listed Building – Grade II
- Official name: Former Lodge to Westholme
- Designated: 14 November 1974
- Reference no.: 1360442

Listed Building – Grade II
- Official name: Former Stables to Westholme
- Designated: 14 November 1974
- Reference no.: 1307081

Listed Building – Grade II
- Official name: Garden wall to the rear of former stables to Westholme
- Designated: 5 February 1986
- Reference no.: 1261310

Westholme House is a historic building in the English market town of Sleaford in Lincolnshire, set in 32 acres of parkland and school grounds. Built around 1849 in the style of a French Gothic mansion by Charles Kirk the Younger for his business partner Thomas Parry, it was privately owned until the 1940s, when Kesteven County Council acquired the house and its grounds. It subsequently served as the county library and part of Sleaford Secondary Modern School (later St George's Academy). The stone house follows an asymmetrical layout and incorporates a range of Gothic elements in its design. In 1974, it was recorded in the National Heritage List for England as a designated Grade II listed building, recognising it as of "special interest".

== History ==
Prior to the enclosure of Sleaford in 1794, the lands that later became the Westholme estate were mostly open fields. The largest was Puddingpan Race behind the houses on Westgate, thought to be named for the muddy puddles that formed there. That field was bounded to the north by Drove Lane, a track running to South Rauceby, and parts of the future estate also included "Millgatemere Furlong" to the north west and claypits to the north east. Following the enclosure, Drove Lane was straightened and moved northwards by a third of a mile; the old open fields were reorganised within this new space, producing straight, geometric boundary lines. The future Westholme grounds were divided up between several land-owners, including Lord Bristol and Benjamin Handley.

=== Private ownership ===
Thomas Parry (1818−1879), an architect, builder and future Member of Parliament for Boston, had purchased the estate by 1846; (Note: At that time, Parry was lodging with his business partner Charles Kirk's family at one of the homes in the terrace at 40–44 Boston Road, Sleaford, which Kirk had constructed c. 1840–41.) he employed his business partner and brother-in-law, Charles Kirk the Younger, to design Westholme House on the site for him; their firm Kirk and Parry completed the mansion around 1849. Parry moved in with his wife, mother and sister, and employed two servants; by 1871, two domestic workers had been added to his household. Parry died in 1879 followed by his wife, Henrietta, in 1882.

Henry Peake (1821–1886) and his family were occupying Westholme by 1883. Peake was a solicitor who served as clerk to the county magistrates, and was a partner in the local law firm Peake, Snow and Peake, along with his son Henry Arthur Peake. The partnership had connections with Kirk and Parry, and Peake married Eliza, a daughter of Charles Kirk the Elder. After his death, Peake's sons, George Herbert and Henry Arthur, successively occupied the house in the late 19th and early 20th centuries. During the First World War, Henry Arthur and his wife, Alice Ann, lost three of their sons in battle. (Note: Mrs Peake opened the town's war memorial in 1922.) In 1923, Henry Arthur died while staying at Hastings. He and his wife were planning to sell Westholme and move to Guildford before his death; she did so and died there in 1933. The businessman and Liberal politician Samuel Pattinson (1870–1942) lived at the house from at least 1924. His wife, Betsy Sharpley Pattinson, also died in 1942 and their trustees auctioned off the furniture at Westholme two years later.

=== Public ownership ===
Westholme was occupied by the military during the Second World War. Kesteven County Council had acquired the property and its parkland by 1945 and proposed to use it for educational purposes. The council wanted to convert the house into Kesteven County Library, but it had to wait for the War Department to agree to pay fees for "dilapidations" caused during its occupancy. The Department provisionally agreed on £1,276 16s in 1947 and the library was operating at the house by 1949. A Navy, Army and Air Force Institutes (NAAFI) canteen at the site supplied school meals after the war; and in 1947 the council bought a series of huts on the site from the War Department. The parkland at Westholme was used as playing fields for students at Sleaford Secondary Modern School in the late 1940s, and the school acquired HORSA huts at Westholme to use as classrooms in the 1950s. A metalwork room and sports pavilion were added and Westholme Lodge was also taken over by the school during that decade.

Earlier post-war plans had envisaged a separate secondary modern for girls being built on the site and Kesteven and Sleaford High School being rebuilt there, but in 1957 the County Council proposed building a new mixed secondary modern at Westholme instead. In 1961, a new school building at Westholme had opened with an assembly hall, five classes and kitchens. The secondary modern continued operating there alongside its original buildings on Church Lane. In 1983, an extension to the Westholme block opened, allowing the school to close the old site; new teaching blocks were then built around the grounds. The school changed its name to St George's School in 1984, became a technology college in 1992 and converted to St George's Academy in 2010. The house continued to be used by the library service into the 1980s, but by the next decade, had become the school's sixth form base and an adult education centre. As a result of major rebuilding work at St George's in 2011–12, a new sixth form centre opened and Westholme House was converted into the school's administrative centre.

== Architecture ==
Charles Kirk and Thomas Parry were builders and architects in Sleaford; their company prospered in the mid-19th century and was responsible for a number of civic, religious and corporate buildings in the town, including the gas works, Carre's Grammar School and Carre's Hospital. Westholme has been called their "most cheerfully inventive" building; built in the style of a Gothic château, Pevsner described the mansion as "an ebullient essay in French [15th century] domestic Gothic."

The two-storey house is built in coursed stone with steep, Welsh slate roofing. Its asymmetrical design incorporates an eclectic range of Gothic elements, including tall, polygonal chimney stacks, a four-centred arch doorway, dragon motifs and carved pinnacles. The eastern façade includes two gables with a tall four-centred arch window. To the right is a tower of three-storeys with a pointed roof which connects to a projecting bay of two storeys. The bay incorporates a stack of three square windows topped with a Flamboyant arch, two hipped roofs with decorative spikes, and three chimneys. The rear is more simple; the windows are mullioned and most are square, except for three bay windows. It has two wings laid out like half an "H", which each have a gable and embattled parapets.

The site also houses a Gothic stable-block, which Sir Nikolaus Pevsner considered "charming", and two Tudor-style lodges. These outbuildings incorporate medieval stone fragments probably retained by Kirk during church restorations. A stretch of wall in the grounds is 100m long and made up of stone fragments, many Gothic, which were also most likely taken from church restorations conducted by Kirk and Parry. One of the lodges, the stable-block and the wall have their own Grade II listings.

== See also ==
- Listed buildings in Sleaford
