= Old Sleaford =

Settlement in Lincolnshire

Coordinates: 52.9894°N 0.4007°W

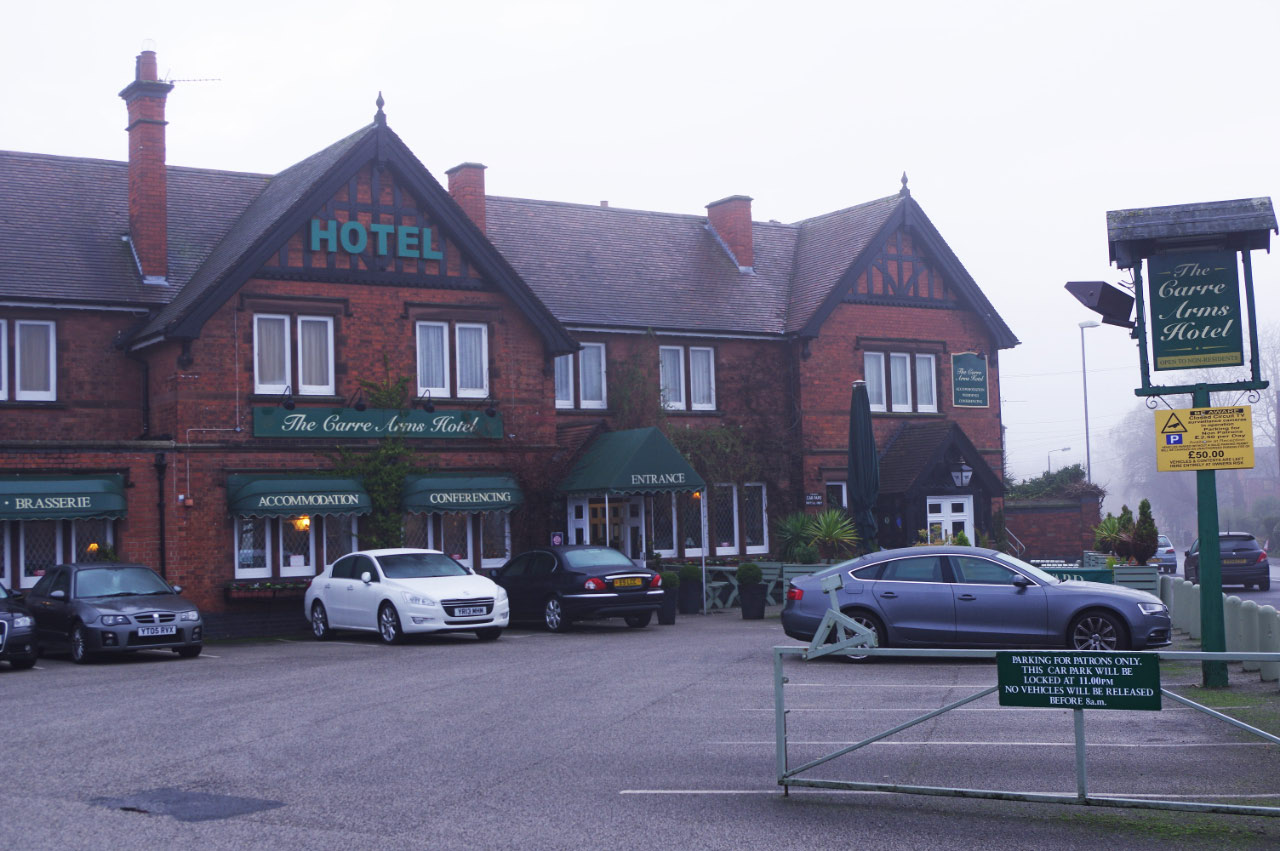
- The Carre Arms Hotel

- Location within Lincolnshire
- Civil parish: Sleaford
- District: North Kesteven
- Shire county: Lincolnshire
- Region: East Midlands
- Country: England
- Sovereign state: United Kingdom

Old Sleaford is a former settlement and ancient parish, now in the civil parish of Sleaford, in the North Kesteven district, in the county of Lincolnshire, England. It was south-east of the market town of New Sleaford (generally called Sleaford). In 1951 the parish had a population of 820. On 1 April 1974 the parish was abolished to form Sleaford.
