= Sessions House, Sleaford =

Municipal building in Sleaford, England

Sessions House
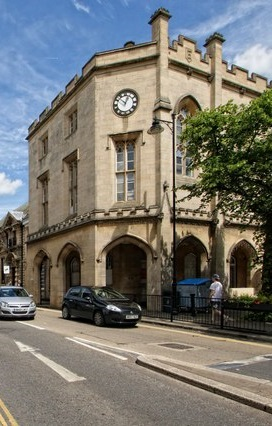
- Sessions House, Sleaford

- Shown in Lincolnshire
- 52.9998°N 0.4102°W
- Location: Market Place, Sleaford

History
- Built: 1831

Site notes
- Architect: Henry Edward Kendall
- Architectural style: Gothic revival style

Listed Building – Grade II*
- Official name: Town Hall (Sessions House)
- Designated: 16 July 1949
- Reference no.: 1307024

The Sessions House, also known as Sleaford Town Hall, is a judicial structure in the Market Place, Sleaford, Lincolnshire, England. The structure, which used to be the main courthouse for the county of Kesteven, is a Grade II* listed building.

== History ==
The first venue for the quarter sessions in Sleaford was an earlier sessions house in the southwest corner of the Market Place which dated back to 1755. In the early 19th century, the justices complained that the old sessions hall was dilapidated, but the lord of the manor, Frederick Hervey, 1st Marquess of Bristol, refused to carry out repairs. He eventually agreed to sell the old building to the justices so that they could fund the building of a new courthouse. The site the justices selected was in the northwest corner of the Market Place. The new building was designed by Henry Edward Kendall in the Gothic revival style, built in ashlar stone at a cost of £7,000 and was completed in 1831.

The detailed design and construction was supervised by Charles Kirk. The design involved a canted main frontage on the corner of North Gate and Market Street. The main frontage featured an arched opening with a hood mould on the ground floor, a bi-partite mullioned and transomed window on the first floor and a prominent clock above. The North Gate frontage, of two bays, involved a colonnade on the ground floor, bi-partite mullioned and transomed windows on the first floor and small square windows at attic level, while the Market Street frontage of five bays involved a colonnade on the ground floor and a row of bi-partite mullioned and transomed windows with quatrefoils in the arches on the first floor. There was a castellated belt course above the colonnade and a castellated parapet at roof level. On the Market Street frontage, the outer bays were flanked by full-height buttresses. Internally, the principal room was the courtroom in which the quarter sessions were held.

A drinking fountain, commissioned to commemorate the life of Frederick Hervey, 2nd Marquess of Bristol and protected by a pyramid-shaped roof supported by four marble columns, was unveiled outside the building in 1874.

The building was also used as a venue for public meetings and, in that capacity, was referred to as the "Town Hall". The building also continued to be used as a facility for dispensing justice but, in 2008, the building was declared no longer fit for purpose and magistrates court hearings were transferred to Grantham.

In 2009, the restaurateur, Vito Cataffo, acquired the building and initiated works to convert the ground floor of the sessions house for restaurant use and the first floor for office space. Cataffo, who presented the Channel 4, television programme Dolce Vito – Dream Restaurant, died the following year. The drinking fountain was restored with financial support from the National Lottery Heritage Fund and the Lincolnshire Community Foundation, in 2019.

== See also ==
- Grade II* listed buildings in North Kesteven
- Listed buildings in Sleaford
