= Manor House, Sleaford =

Set of connected buildings located on Northgate in Sleaford, Lincolnshire, England

Coordinates: 53.00046°N 0.41073°W

The Manor House and Rhodes House, Sleaford
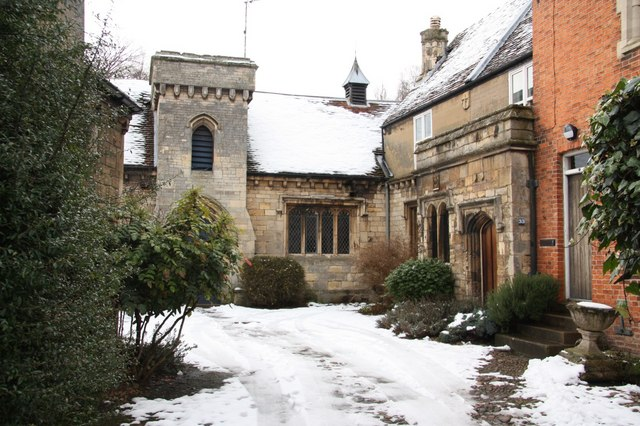
- The Manor House (No. 31, Northgate)

- Location within Lincolnshire
- Location: Sleaford, Lincolnshire, England
- OS grid reference: TF 06768 46001

History
- Built: 16th and 17th centuries with significant 19th century additions (No. 31); mid-18th century (No. 33)

Listed Building – Grade II*
- Official name: Manor House, Rhodes House, wall and gate piers to cobbled yard and garden wall to no. 33
- Designated: 16 July 1949
- Reference no.: 1168499

The Manor House is a set of connected buildings located on Northgate in the English town of Sleaford, Lincolnshire. A complex arrangement, parts of the Manor House date to the 16th century, but they were extended with the addition of the Georgian Rhodes House and later Gothic-Revival work. It was a private residence until the 20th century, and is now divided into commercial properties and residential apartments. The house was owned by a number of families and individuals, including local banker and businessman Benjamin Handley and Sophia Peacock, whose nephews, Cecil and Frank Rhodes, spent their summers at the estate as children.

The building is divided into two plots: The Manor House (No. 31) and Rhodes House (No. 33). The former is a complex of buildings, mostly in stone. It is accessed through a cobbled courtyard, with a 19th-century Gothic west front, including a small tower; part of the north side of the yard is a 17th-century gabled building. The brick-built Rhodes House faces directly onto the street. Described by Sir Nikolaus Pevsner and John Harris as "a jigsaw puzzle", the Manor House is notable for its re-use of medieval masonry, some dating to the 14th century and others likely being removed from Sleaford Castle. In 1949, it was recorded in the National Heritage List for England as a designated Grade II* listed building, recognising it as "particularly important ... of more than special interest."

== History ==
=== Origins ===
The origins of the Manor House and its early history have not been fully studied. In 1872, Edward Trollope mentioned it in his history of Sleaford, writing that "all its details are not honestly known". English Heritage and the architectural historians Sir Nikolaus Pevsner and John Harris date parts of No. 31 to the 17th century and categorise most of No. 33 as mid-18th century and "mid-Georgian" respectively; however, local historian Dr Simon Pawley, states that No. 33 is 19th century. An estate map of 1766 shows that the plot was not part of the open field system around Sleaford. A more detailed map, dated to c. 1770, has a building on a plot owned by Robert Banks, corresponding to the location of Rhodes House. An enclosure map completed in 1794 shows a small building at the site, set back slightly from the road and adjoined by a larger one to the north, which faced onto the street; the location and layout also correspond closely to the arrangement of the older parts of Nos. 31 and 33.

=== Nineteenth century ===
By the 19th century, the house was occupied by the banker, businessman and solicitor Benjamin Handley. He was Treasurer of the Sleaford Navigation and solicitor to the enclosure commission for Sleaford and several fenland villages, through which service he "amassed a great fortune". It is not clear when ownership of the house changed, but Maurice Peter Moore, clerk of the peace for Kesteven, lived there from at least 1851 until his death. The son of Rev. Dr William Moore, vicar of Spalding, he was admitted as a solicitor in 1831. Moore was living in Sleaford by 1834, when he is recorded as owning as property on North Street, and was in partnership with William Forbes by 1841. Moore married Ann Gardiner Peacock in 1834. Their first daughter, Florence, died an infant in 1838 and Ann Moore died giving birth to their only surviving child, Anne Louisa Russell (known as Russell), in 1839.

Moore considered disinheriting his daughter, writing that "Russell's conduct towards me continues to be cold and heartless ... and I must look on her as not deserving to inherit from me". Sophia Peacock, a sister of his wife, was closely involved in Russell's up-bringing and Moore developed romantic feelings for her; in 1858, he changed his will to give her his property instead of Russell, but Sophia rejected his marriage proposal and he disinherited her the following year. Despite Moore's "vehement objections", his daughter married George Edward Corrance in 1860. After a year she eloped with Colonel Edward William de Lancy Lowe; they married in 1866, after Corrance divorced her on grounds of adultery. Her father "had always reason to be dissatisfied with her conduct" and, three months before his death, he made a new will and bequeathed all of his property to Peacock. After Moore's death, Russell Lowe and her paternal uncle, Rev. Edward Moore opened a court case to contest the will. In March 1868, the courts found that the will was legal. Sophia Peacock inherited nearly all of Moore's estate.

Sophia and Ann Gardiner Peacock's father, Anthony Taylor Peacock of South Kyme, was a wealthy banker and his father, Anthony Peacock, was a land-owner, who had worked closely with Benjamin Handley as a sponsor of the Sleaford Navigation and commissioner of enclosures in the 1790s. Among the younger Peacock's other daughters was Louisa, who married Rev. Francis William Rhodes in 1844. Louisa and Francis Rhodes's nine children included Cecil Rhodes and Frank Rhodes; they spent their childhood summers with their aunt Sophia at the Manor House in Sleaford and in the Channel Islands. Frank and Cecil learnt to ride at the Manor and it was during these visits to Sleaford that Cecil began his long friendship with Robert Yerburgh, a son of the town's vicar. On Sophia Peacock's death in 1892, Frank Rhodes inherited the Manor House. He was still living there in 1897.

=== Later history ===
In 1897, Elizabeth Cross rented the Manor House from Rhodes, remaining there until her death in 1923. She moved to Sleaford after the death of her husband, John Edward Cross, a prebendary of Lincoln. She purchased "ancient buildings" around Lincolnshire so that their old stonework could be incorporated into the house. It was put up for sale in 1924 and James Gordon Jeudwine and his wife were resident at the house the following year. Jeudwine was a son of Canon George Wynne Jeudwine; a solicitor, he became a partner in the firm Peake, Snow and Peake in 1937, the same year that he was appointed Clerk to the Justices of the Sleaford petty sessional division. He lived at the house until his death from injuries received in a car accident in 1941. The buildings were divided so that the old Manor House became No. 31 and the 18th century part became No. 33 (known as Rhodes House). By the 1960s, ownership had changed hands again: the Manor House was sold by C. B. Cliff to H. A. Mills of Newark in 1967. Mills became headmaster of the William Alvey School in Sleaford. In the 1970s, the owner of No. 31, R. W. Edgely, submitted an application for planning permission to demolish the stables at No. 31 and build a house to its rear; Mills, along with Sleaford and District Civic Trust opposed the plans. From the 1960s to 1992, Sleaford Medical Group practised at Rhodes House and in a building behind it. As of 2015, the building is divided into residential apartments.

== Architecture ==
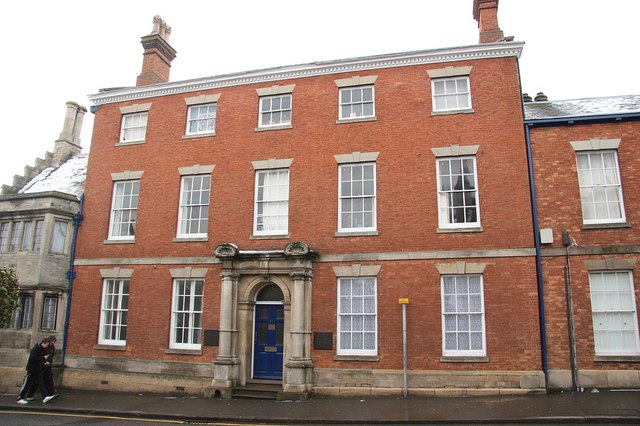
Rhodes House

The Manor House is a complicated group of buildings. Its earliest part dates from the 16th century, although it is built with stone-work from two centuries earlier. No. 31 is largely 19th century, incorporating older buildings and inset with medieval elements. Sir Nikolaus Pevsner summarised that "it is hard to discriminate between what is genuine and what is 19th century fancy". No. 33 is mid-Georgian.

No. 31 is accessed through two 18th-century gate-piers adorned with pineapple finials which open onto a cobbled courtyard in front of the house. The western façade is 19th century and stone; a single-storey, it incorporates a tower, in the centre of which is a 14th-century door, beneath a small pointed window. The rear contains a blend of medieval features, including a 14th-century head of a king, set into a chimney. The north side of the courtyard contains a projected square bay dated to 1637 and incorporates an octagonal 14th century chimney piece, reckoned to have belonged to the Old Deanery in Lincoln. This joins to an 18th-century brick section, which is connected to the right with a 17th-century crow-stepped gabled stone house. A stone wall attached to that section is inset by a blocked door, the base of which forms a dog's drinking fountain. The doorway, along with some of the other imported stonework, was probably taken from the decaying Sleaford Castle, now ruined. The interior includes a room dated to the early 17th century, with panelling and Tudor Revival motifs.

Rhodes House, No. 33, dates to the mid-18th century. A three-storey brick building with five bays and a classical stone door-case, with Doric columns and an entablature. To the north is a two-storey mid-19th century extension, also in brick, and an adjoining former garden wall. The rear has seven bays and two projecting wings, dating to the 18th century. Internally, one room has 17th-century panelling of a Tudor design.
