= Kirk and Parry =

Architectural and civil engineering practice in Sleaford, England

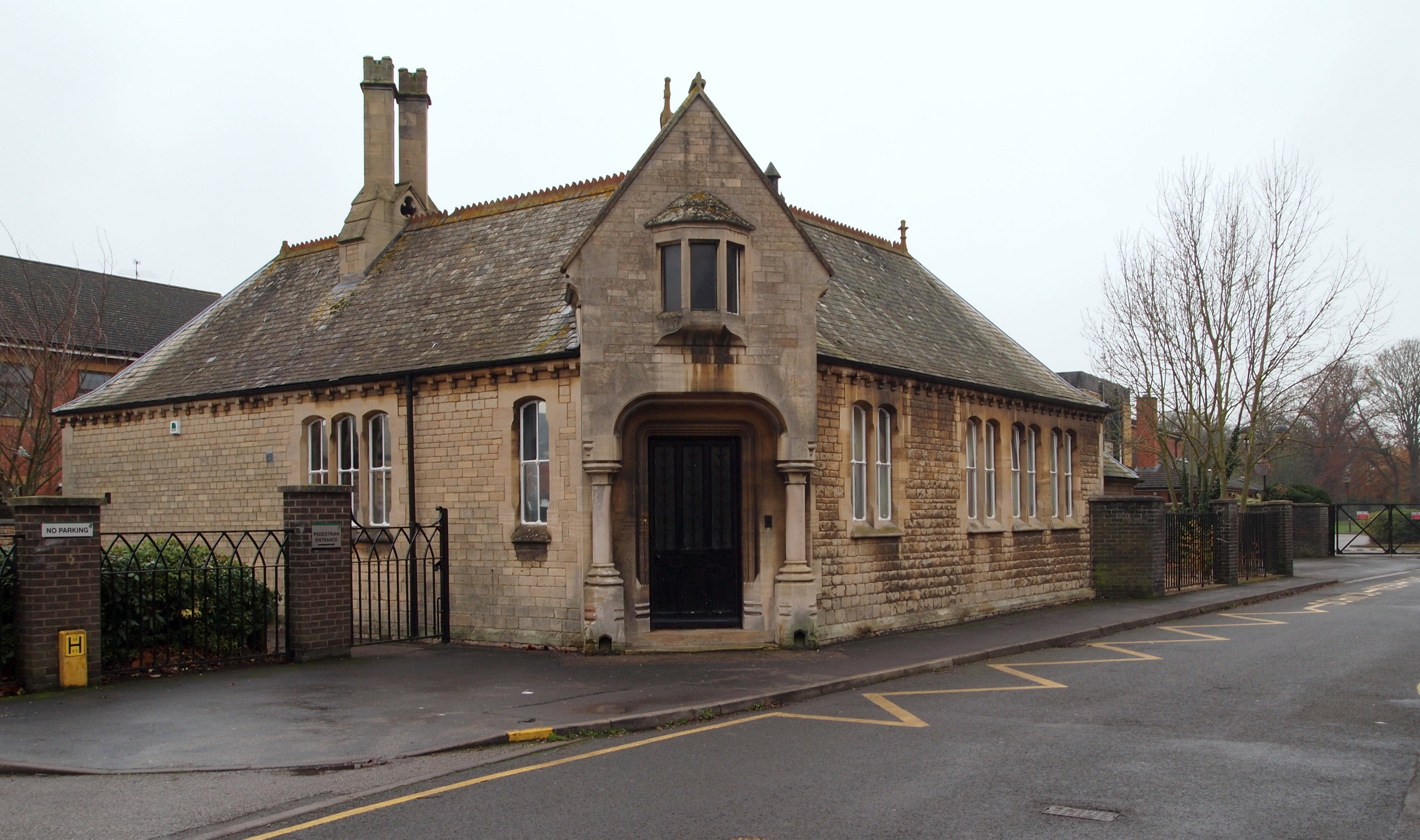
- Offices of Kirk and Parry, Jermyn Street, Sleaford

Practice information
- Partners: Charles Kirk (junior) and Thomas Parry
- Founded: 1847
- Dissolved: 1908
- Location: Sleaford

Kirk and Parry were an architectural and civil engineering practice in Sleaford that specialised in the design of public buildings, housing and the construction of Railways. The practice was initially founded by Charles Kirk (1791–1847). Thomas Parry, (1818–1879) was an articled clerk to Charles Kirk. Parry married Henrietta, daughter of Charles Kirk in 1841 and formed a partnership with Charles Kirk. Following the death of Charles Kirk in 1847, his son, Charles Kirk (junior) (1825–1902), then became a partner with Thomas Parry. Charles Kirk Junior was the architect in the practice and Parry probably acted as an administrator. Thomas Parry was a Liberal Party politician from who sat in the House of Commons for three short periods between 1865 and 1874. By 1903 the firm had changed its name to Kirk, Knight and Co. This article surveys the work of Kirk and Parry and its successor firm, from 1847 until it ceased trading in 1906.

== Public Buildings ==
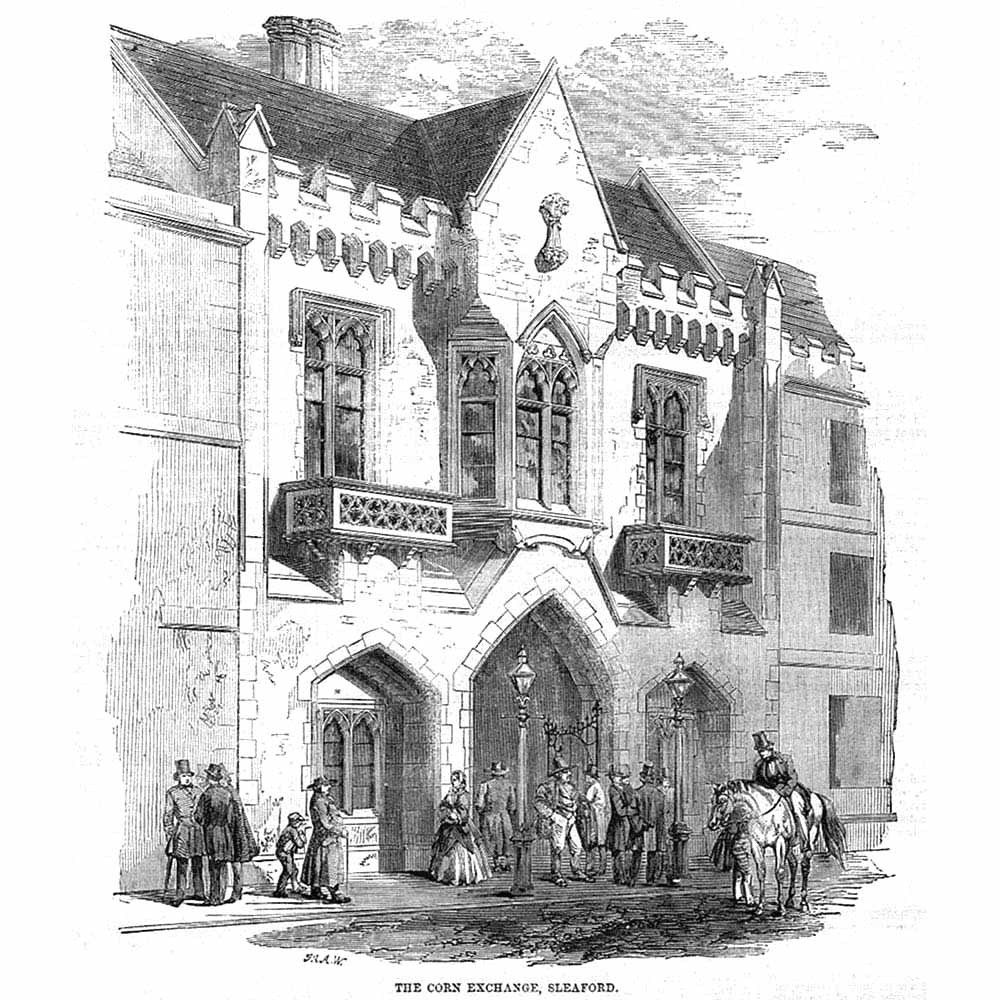
Sleaford Corn Exchange, 1859

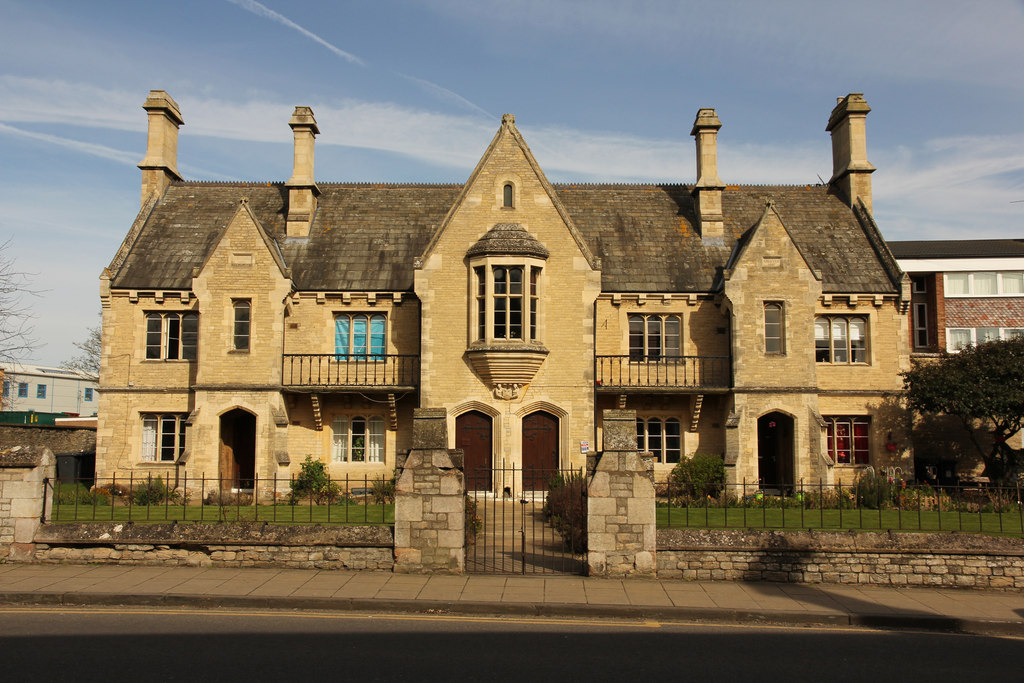
Northgate Almshouses, Sleaford

- Sleaford Corn Exchange 1859. Sleaford Corn Exchange occupied the 19 Market Place. It was built by Kirk & Parry in 1857 and comprised the main exchange building at ground floor level, an extensive basement butter market and other ancillary accommodation. It was demolished in 1964.
- Northgate Almshouses, Northgate Street, Sleaford. Built as an extension for the Carre's Almhouse in 1857.
- The Old Trustee Saving Bank, Northgate Street, Sleaford. Built adjacent to the Northgate Almshouses, possibly in 1857.

== Schools ==
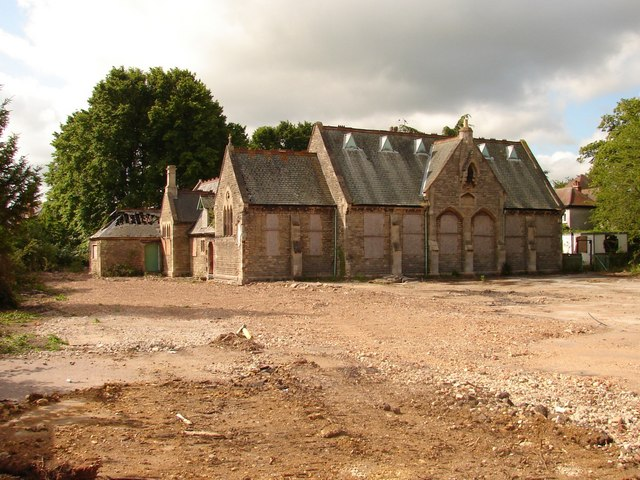
Former St Botolph's Primary School, Sleaford

- Alvey's School, Eastgate, Sleaford, Lincolnshire. 1851. Stone faced with shaped gables.

- St Botolphs Primary School, Sleaford.
- Cowley's School, Donington, Lincolnshire Single storied ranges added in 1861 in Tudor style,
- Kirby La Thorpe Primary School
- Quarrington Primary School, 1867
- Fleckney, Leicestershire. 1872
- Heighington, Lincolnshire. 1878 School built for Washingborough School Board.

== Houses ==
- Westholme House, Sleaford. Built for Thomas Parry to designs by Charles Kirk (junior), c1847.

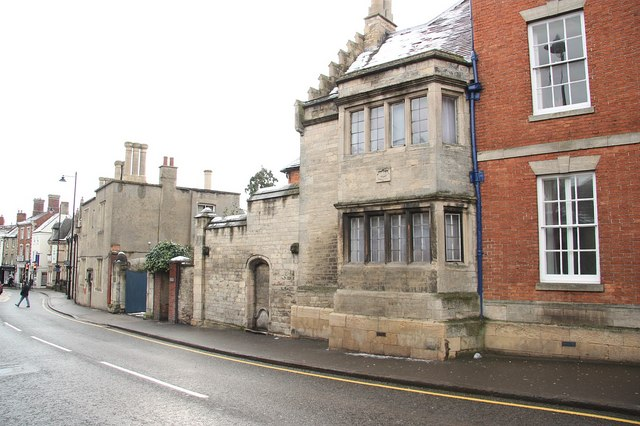
Manor House, Northgate, Sleaford

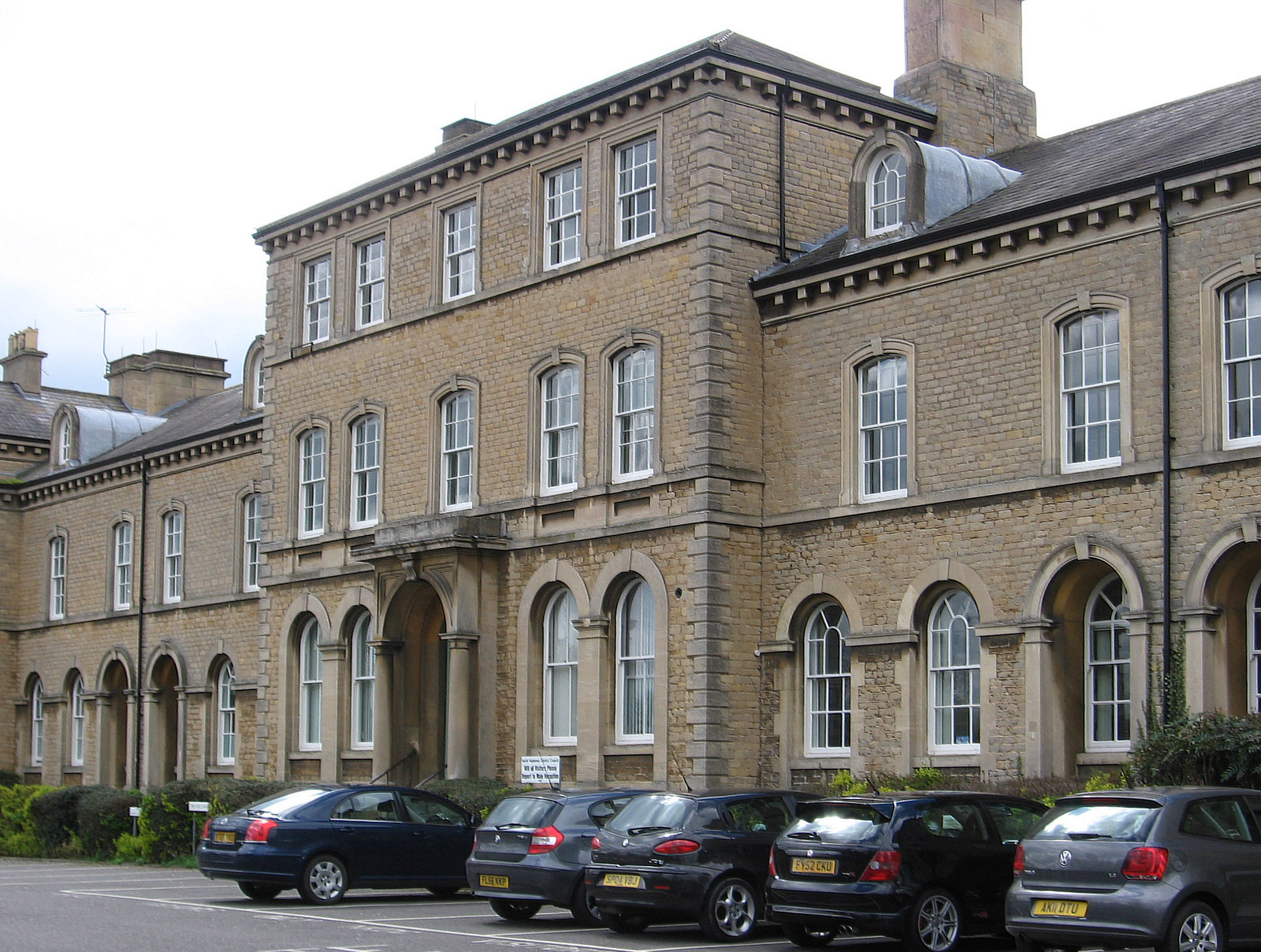
Lafford Terrace, Sleaford

- The Manor House, Sleaford. A concoction of Victorian masonry and medieval stone fragments, which presumably had been gathered by Charles Kirk during his church restoration. It has been listed as Grade II*
- Lafford Terrace. Eastgate. A speculative terrace built by Kirk and Parry in 1856, which later became the Kesteven County Council Offices.
- No. 21. Northgate. Formerly the lodge to Westhome. Stone house described as "French Gothic" in style.
- Sleaford Vicarage. Red brick extension of 1861.
- Dr Bissell's House, Sleaford Market Place 1853.

== Churches ==
=== New Churches or very largely rebuilt ===
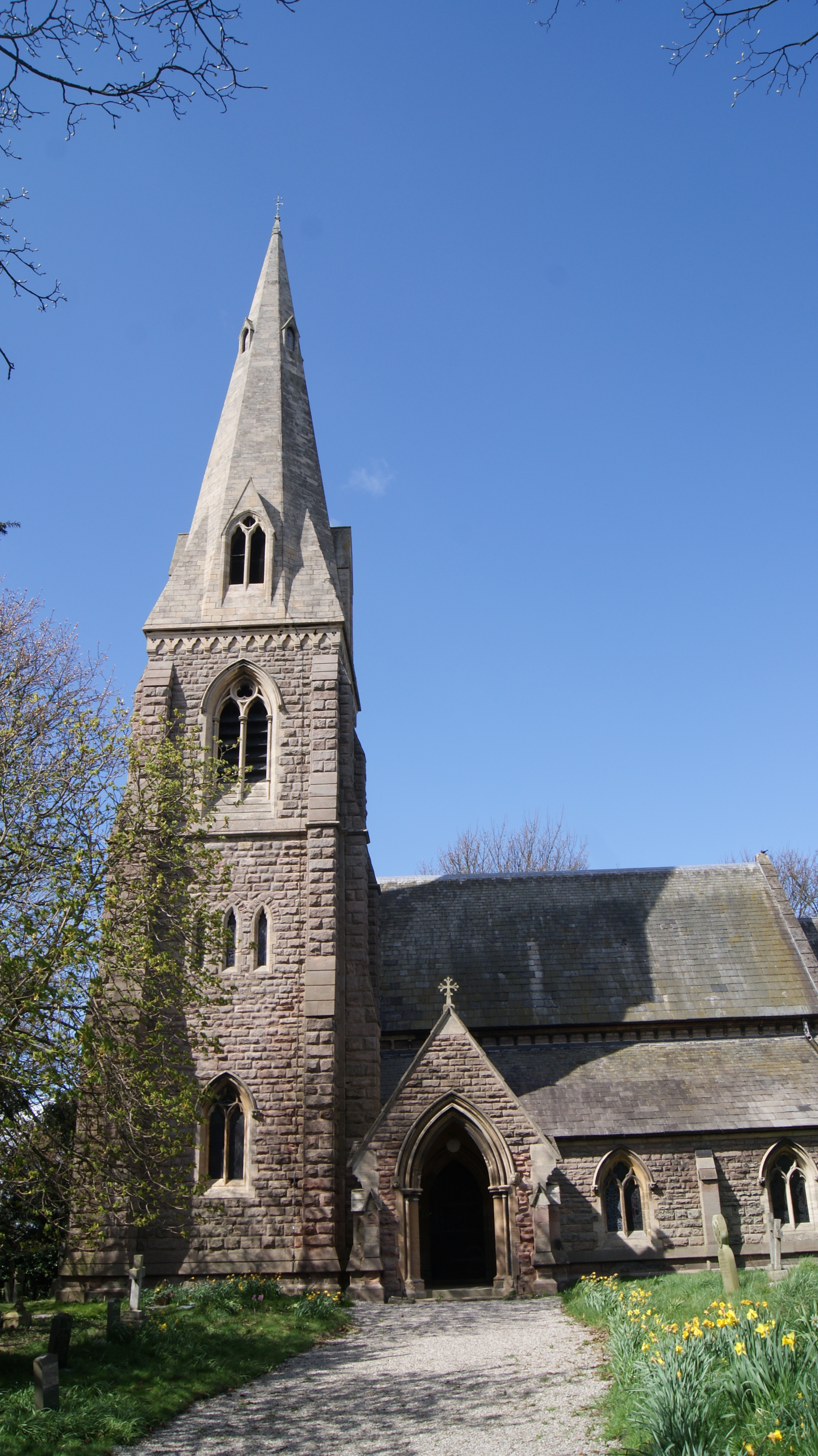
St John the Baptist Church, Hunsingore

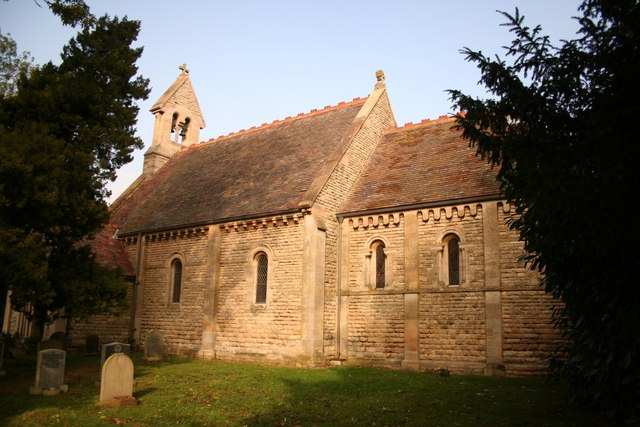
St.Lucia's church, Dembleby

- Hunsingore. St John the Baptist Yorkshire. Built in 1867-8 by Kirk and Parry of Sleaford, Lincolnshire at the cost of Joseph Dent of Ribston Hall.

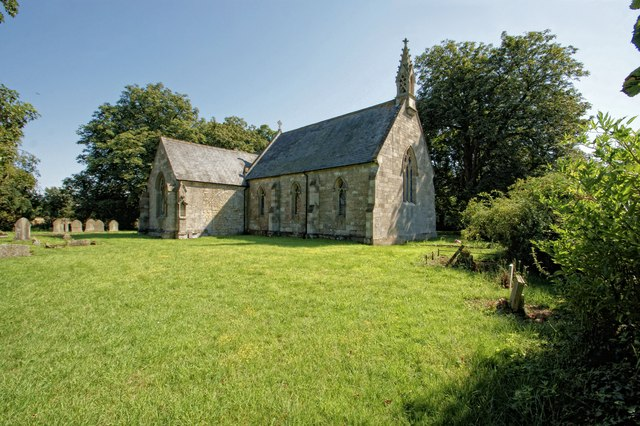
The Church of St Andrew, Burton Pedwardine, 1870

- St Lucia, Dembleby. Rebuilt on new site in Romanesque Revival Style in 1867-8. Twin bellcote. The chancel arch is a Romesque arch from the ordinal church.
- St. Andrew's church, Burton Pedwardine, Lincolnshire. The original 14th century church largely collapsed in 1802. Charles Kirk built this church in 1870 incorporating some of the medieval masonry and part of the north aisle.

=== Restored Churches ===
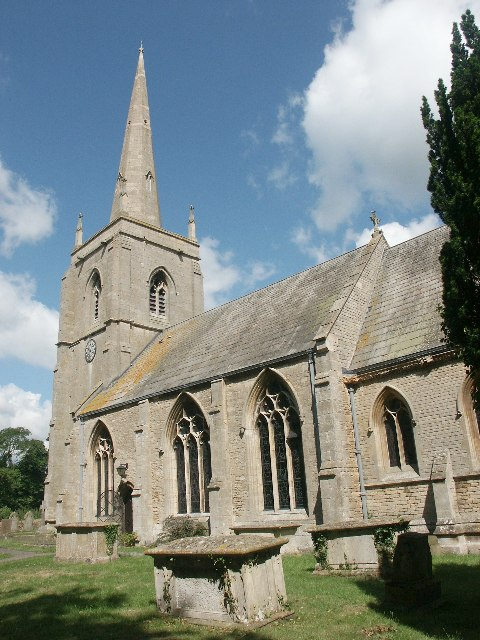
St Botolph, Quarrington

- St Martin, Ancaster, Lincolnshire. (1859) Restoration work to North Arcade.
- St Catharine, Houghton on the Hill, Leicestershire. (1859–1860) restoration of chancel and nave.
- St Botolph, Quarrington. The tower was built about 1325 and apart from the replacement of four pinnacles in 1887 restoration has been minimal. The Perpendicular styled font dates from the late 14th-century; however its cover is dated 1856. The raised quinquangular apse with its unusual style was designed and built by Charles Kirk (1825–1902), in 1862. Charles Kirk was a devout churchman and churchwarden of Quarrington and the tall candlesticks commemorate him.
- St. Thomas a Becket, Northaw
- Stroxton, Lincolnshire. Rebuilt chancel (1874–5)
- Holy Trinity, Barrow upon Humber, Lincolnshire. 1868–70. Restoration includes a new north aisle.
- All Saints, Wellingore, Lincolnshire. Restored by Charles Kirk.
- All Saint's, Coleby, Lincolnshire
- St.Mary's church, Marston, Lincs. 1880. Restored by Charles Kirk
- St Andrew, Sempringham. 1897. Added new South porch, which re-used a Romanesque archway from the church that had been incorporated into a dovecote at Spanby.

== Commercial and Industrial Buildings ==
- No 13 Market Square, Boston. A Tudor building that was re-faced by Charles Kirk in the 1870s and later converted into the Scala Cinema. (now Poundland).
- Old Savings Bank, Northgate, Sleaford, Lincolnshire
- Kirk and Parry's Offices and Builders Yard, Sleaford

=== Military Engineering. ===
- Spit of Grain Martello Tower, Kent 1856.

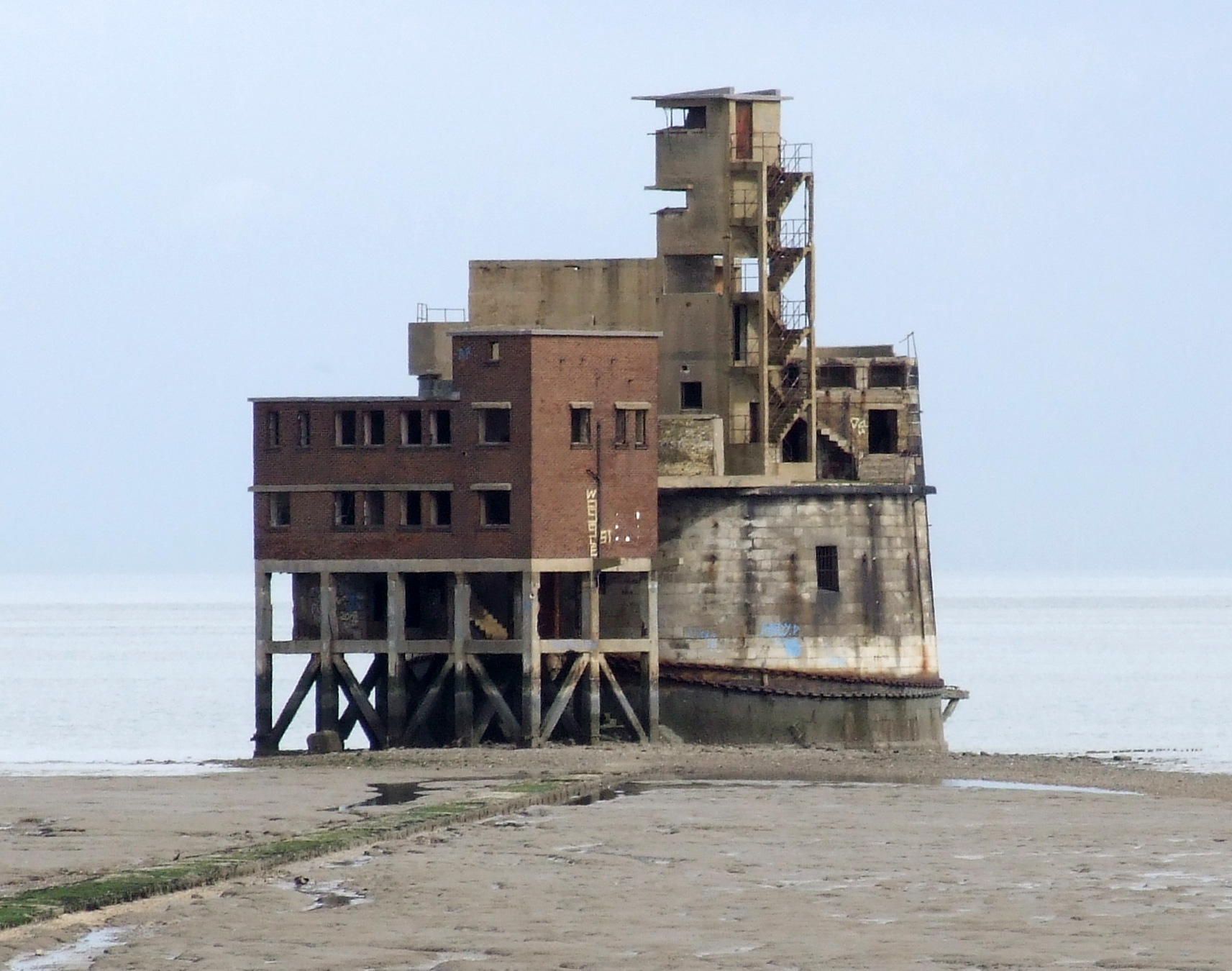
Grain Tower at low tide, with later modifications

‘’The Martello tower, off the Spit Isle of Grain, erected by Messrs. Kirk and Parry, of Sleaford, Lincolnshire, is completed....(for)... the Ordnance authority at Sheerness. The tower has been nearly two years in erection..... The peculiar construction of this tower gives it the facility of firing the guns (which are to be of the largest calibre) on traversing centre pivots, ...(into the).....Thames and Medway ...this tower forms a crossfire with the Sheerness Battery guns, sufficient to sink any ships attempting to pass. The tower is struck from seven different centres, in order to get stability to the available parts. The average thickness of the solid masonry is 12 feet. The outer dimensions are 63 feet by 71 feet, underneath is a barrack room capable of accommodating 30 gunners, and an officers private room. The basement story contains the following rooms; viz, ordnance store, provision store, barrack store, regimental store and magazine, the latter being encased with an entire coat of asphalt. ........ The estimated cost of this tower is about £14,000,.....The extreme height of the tower is 41 feet 6 inches. From the exposed situation of the tower, which is subject to the sea and weather, great difficulties were experienced during the winter months in proceeding with the work.’’

== Work as Building Contractors ==
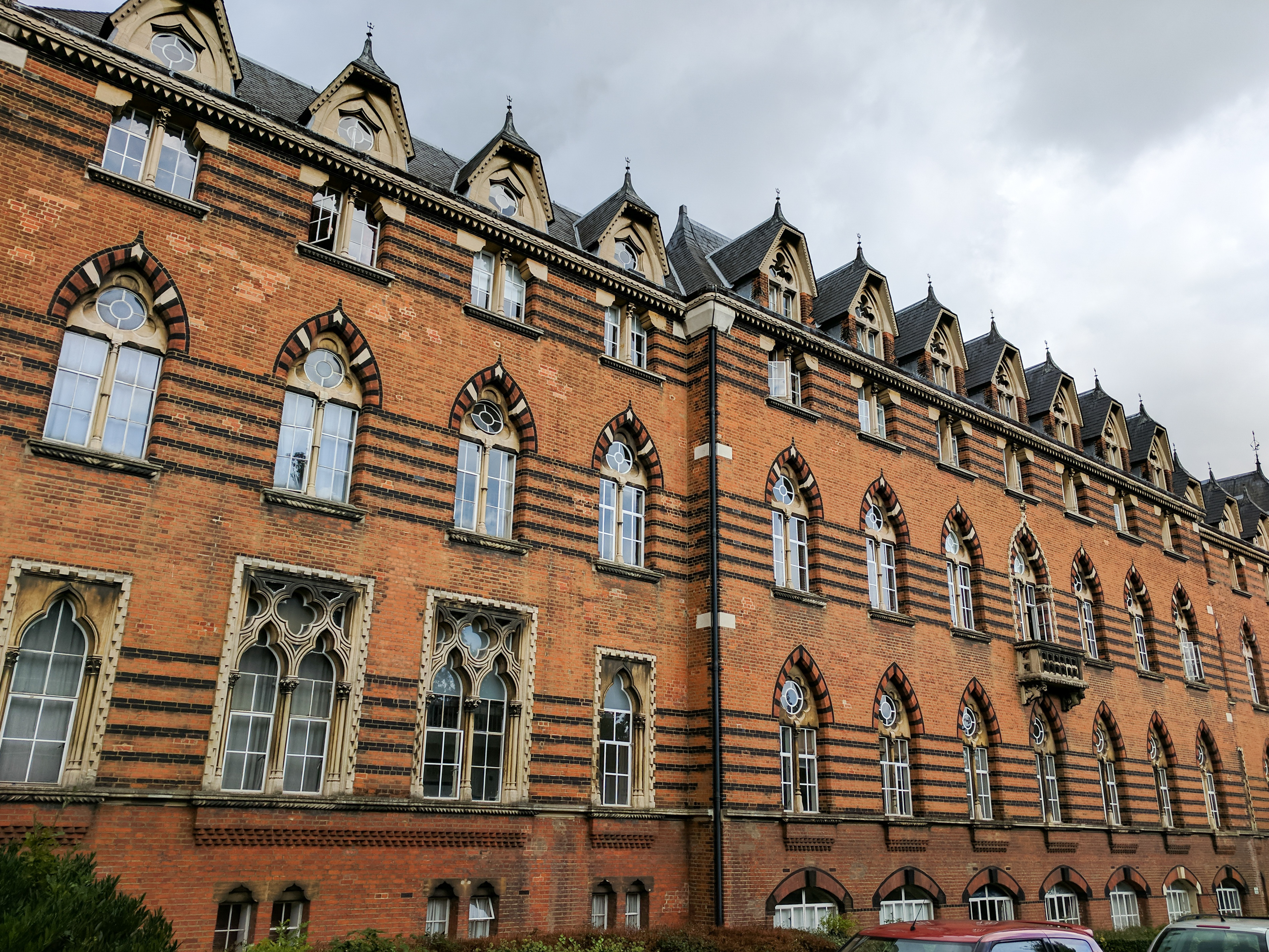
Wanstead Hospital. Architect G Somers Clarke. Building contractors Kirk and Parry

By the 1850s Kirk and Parry had become a major firm of Building Contractors and by the mid-1860 one of the largest building and contracting firms in England. Sir John Summerson, in his analysis of contracting firms working in London, places them in the top seven largest firms in the 1860s, on the basis of the number of contracts they won. These included a printing works for the Printing and Publishing Company in Smithfield and the Merchant's Seaman's Orphanage, which became Wanstead Hospital. Other projects for which they were responsible were Lincoln Prison (1869–72), Whitehaven Docks (1865) and the Scarborough Aquarium (1878)

== Railway Engineering. ==
It is noted that Kirk and Parry were active as railway contractors in the Derby, Leeds, Liverpool and London areas. Specific stations for which they acted as contractors for were Liverpool Central

=== In Lincolnshire the company built two railway lines ===
- The Lincoln to Honington Junction railway for Great Northern Railway. This opened in 1867.
- Sleaford to Ruskington Railway also built for the Great Northern Railway, which opened in 1882.

=== In Yorkshire they built ===
- Scarborough and Whitby Railway in 1872

== Industrial Interests ==
- Steam Power Flour Mill, Jermyn Street Sleaford. Powered 15 Milstones.
- Parry was proprietor of the colliery in Strafford, near Barnsley, Yorkshire.
- Bracebridge Brickworks, Lincoln.c.1872. Kirk and Parry appear to have initially developed the Bracebridge Brickworks to supply bricks for the Lincoln to Honington Junction Railway but may have developed it before it became the Bracebridge Brick Company.
