= Lollycocks Field =

Nature reserve in Lincolnshire, England

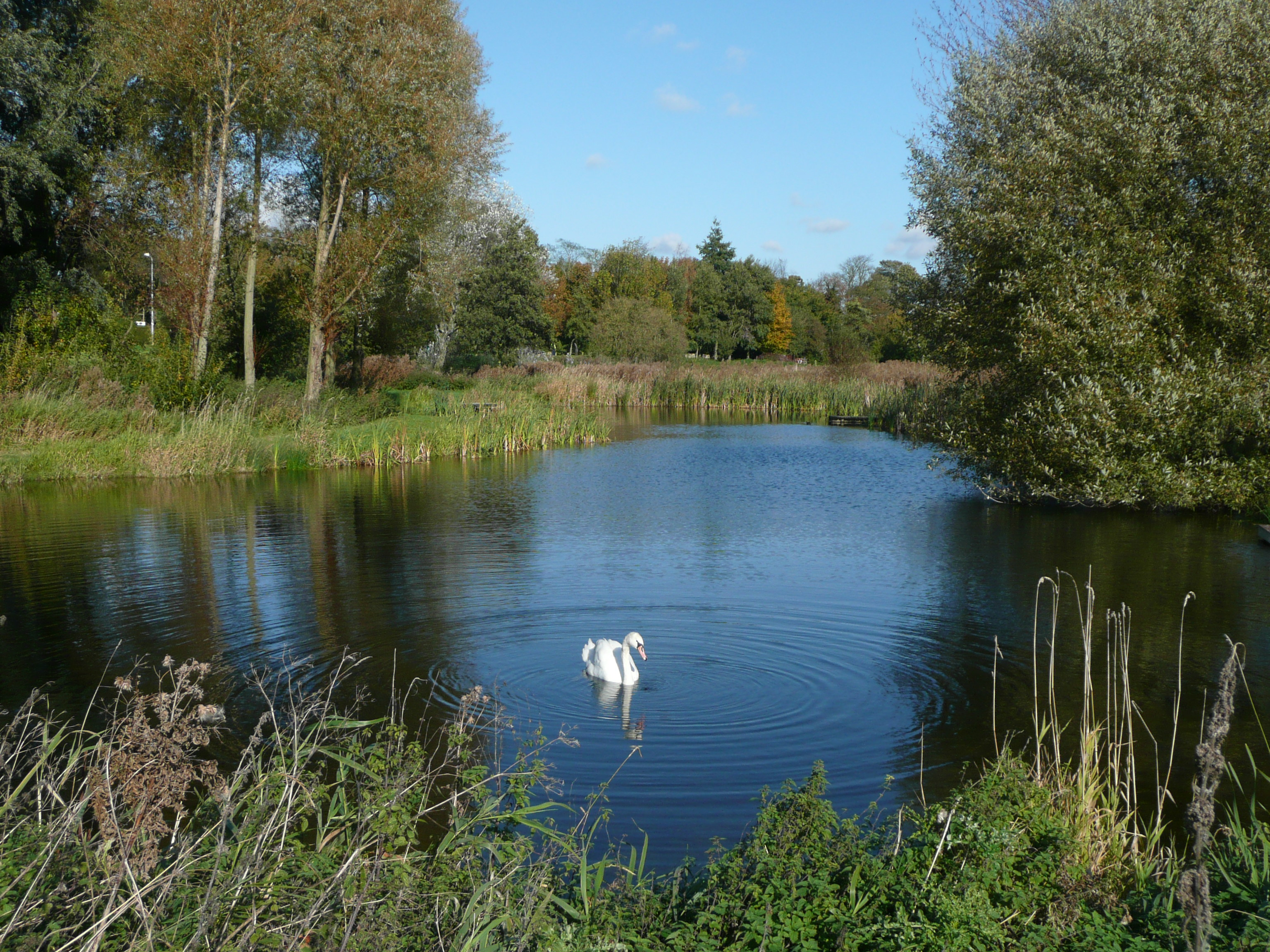
- Lollycocks Pond
- Interactive map of Lollycocks Field
- Type: Local Nature Reserve
- Location: Sleaford, Lincolnshire
- OS grid: TF 072 460
- Area: 2.15 hectares (5.3 acres)
- Manager: Leisure Connection/rangers from Hill Holt Wood

Lollycocks Field is a 2.15-hectare Local Nature Reserve in Sleaford, a market town and civil parish in the North Kesteven district of Lincolnshire. It is owned by North Kesteven District Council and managed by rangers from Hill Holt Wood. Lollycocks Field provides mostly wildflower and wetlands habitats; its pond attracts range of wildlife. It is bounded to the north by Eastgate (B1517 road), to the east by the North Kesteven District Council offices and car park, and to the south by the River Slea. It is just east of Cogglesford Mill. The site can be accessed by the public from Eastgate, and car parks are located on East Road, further into the town (Eastgate Car Park) and also off East Banks.
