= LCW =

LCW is a three-letter acronym which may stand for:

- Leeds Country Way, footpath in West Yorkshire, England
- Lee Chong Wei, a Malaysian badminton player
- Eames Lounge Chair Wood, classic chair design by Charles and Ray Eames
- Leisure Connection Watch, a consumer website monitoring Leisure Connection Ltd
- Link code word in autonegotiation
- .lcw, the file extension for Lucid 3-D spreadsheets
- The Lonesome Crowded West, album by Modest Mouse
- Landing Craft, Air propelled
