= Sleaford =

Town in Lincolnshire, England

- Town and civil parish
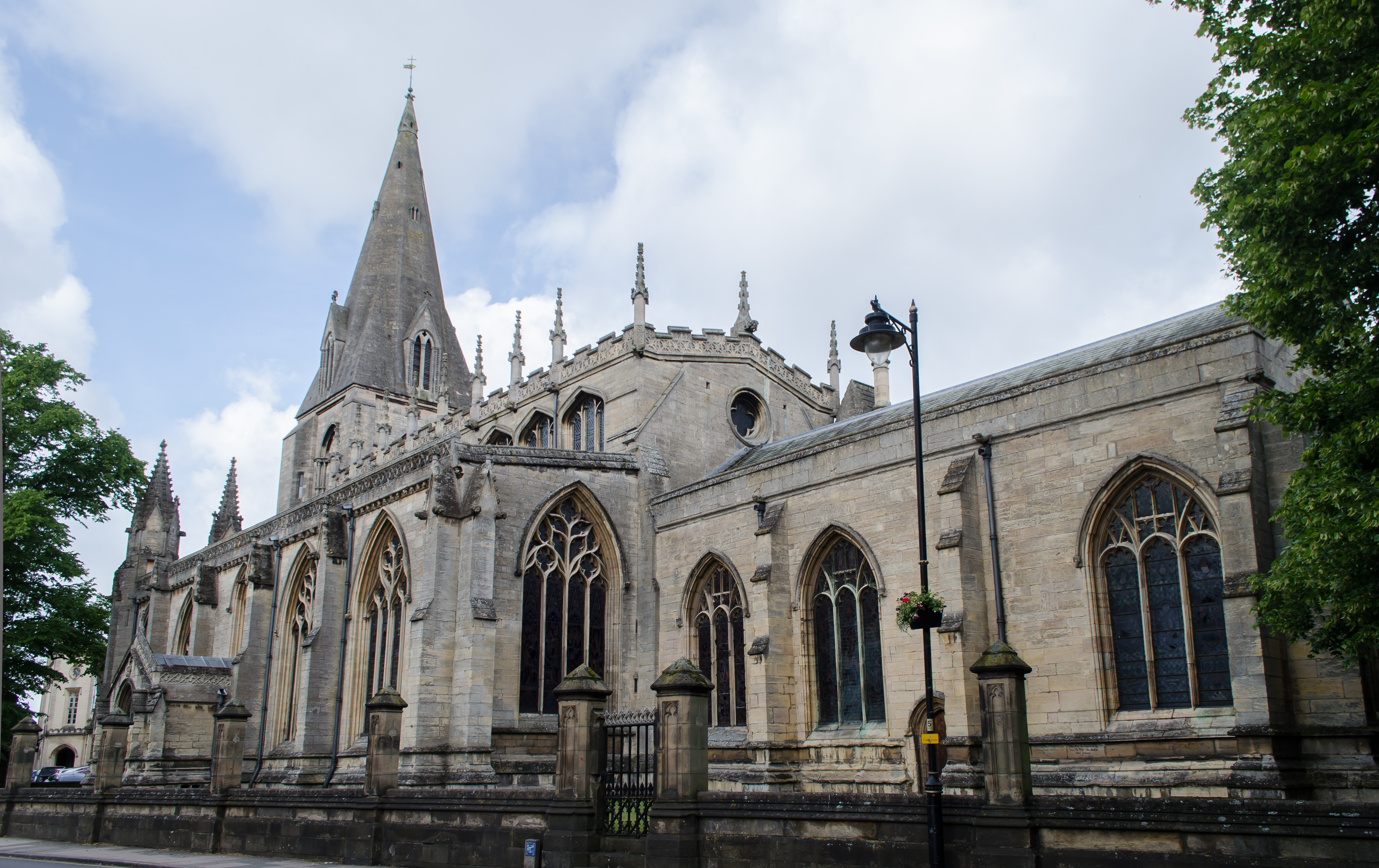
- The church from the side

- Location within Lincolnshire
- Population: 19,807 (2021 Census)
- OS grid reference: TF064455
  - London: 100 mi (160 km) S
- District: North Kesteven
- Shire county: Lincolnshire
- Region: East Midlands
- Country: England
- Sovereign state: United Kingdom
- Post town: SLEAFORD
- Postcode district: NG34
- Dialling code: 01529
- Police: Lincolnshire
- Fire: Lincolnshire
- Ambulance: East Midlands
- UK Parliament: Sleaford and North Hykeham
- Website: www.sleaford.gov.uk

Sleaford is a market town and civil parish in the North Kesteven district of Lincolnshire, England. On the edge of the Fenlands, it is 11 miles (18 kilometres) north-east of Grantham, 16 mi (26 km) west of Boston, and 17 mi (27 km) south of Lincoln. It is the largest settlement in North Kesteven with a population of 19,807 in 2021. Centred on the former parish of New Sleaford, the modern boundaries and urban area include Quarrington to the south-west, Holdingham to the north-west and Old Sleaford to the east. The town is bypassed by the A17 and the A15 roads. Sleaford railway station is on the Nottingham to Skegness (via Grantham) and Peterborough to Lincoln lines.

The first settlement formed in the Iron Age where a prehistoric track crossed the River Slea. It was likely home to a mint for the Corieltauvi in the 1st centuries BC and AD. Evidence of Roman and Anglo-Saxon settlement has been found. Medieval records differentiate between Old and New Sleaford, the latter emerging by the 12th century around the present-day market place and St Denys' Church; Sleaford Castle was also built at that time for the Bishops of Lincoln, who owned the manor. Granted the right to hold a market in the mid-12th century, New Sleaford developed into a market town and became locally important in the wool trade, while Old Sleaford (based near the site of the prehistoric settlement) declined.

From the 16th century, the landowning Carre family kept tight control over the town – it grew little in the early modern period. The manor passed by marriage to the Hervey family (Earls and later Marquesses of Bristol) in 1688. The town's common lands were enclosed by 1794, giving ownership mostly to the Herveys. This coincided with canalisation of the Slea, which brought economic growth until it was superseded by the railways in the mid-1850s. These new transport links supported the development of light industries and expanded the town's role in the trade in agricultural goods. Long a centre for justice and administration in north Kesteven, Sleaford became an urban district in 1894 and was home to Kesteven County Council's offices from 1925 to 1974. After a period of stagnation, in the late 20th and early 21st centuries the sale of farmland around Sleaford led to the development of large housing estates, causing the population to rapidly expand and the urban area to engulf Quarrington and Holdingham.

Though its traditional market has declined in the 21st century (and its cattle and corn markets shut in the 20th century) and much of its heavier manufacturing has departed, Sleaford's economy has diversified. The town remains an important administrative, service and commercial centre for the surrounding district. It houses supermarkets, shops and a large business park with offices and light manufacturing; the headquarters of North Kesteven District Council; three secondary schools (two of which are selective); four primary schools; three newspapers; police, fire and ambulance stations; several places of worship; many sports clubs; a leisure centre; and several medical and dental practices and care homes. Regeneration has transformed some earlier industrial areas, including through the construction of The Hub. The town is one of the largest employment centres in the district; the commonest employers in 2021 were the public sector, retail and, to a much lesser degree, manufacturing.

== Geography ==
Sleaford is a civil parish and market town in the North Kesteven district of Lincolnshire. It is bounded by the civil parishes of Leasingham to the north; Ewerby and Evedon, and Kirkby la Thorpe to the east; Silk Willoughby to the south; and Wilsford, South Rauceby and North Rauceby to the west. These neighbouring parishes are rural, comprising villages separated from Sleaford's urban area by fields, though Kirkby la Thorpe also includes the Milton Way housing estate on Sleaford's eastern fringe.

=== Urban area ===
Sleaford's urban area includes the town centre, focused on the marketplace (fronted by St Denys' Church), where Eastgate, Northgate, Southgate and Westgate meet. Though some parts have been redeveloped in the 20th century, including the Riverside Shopping Precinct and Flaxwell House, the area follows a medieval street layout and is home to many of the town's oldest buildings; it is also the retail and commercial hub. Carre Street (running parallel to Southgate to the east), once home to industry and wharves, has been regenerated in the late 20th and early 21st centuries.

To the north-west of the centre, housing developments along Northgate (which becomes Lincoln Road north of the railway line), mostly built in the 20th and early 21st centuries, have brought the hamlet of Holdingham into Sleaford's urban area, which extends as far north as the A17 and A15 junction at Holdingham Roundabout. To the town's north-east, the built-up area has expanded along Eastgate, where 19th-century housing closer to the town centre gives way to modern business parks; the River Slea forms the southern boundary of these developments and, closer to the town, Lollycocks Field sits between one of the business parks, Eastgate and the Slea. South of the river, the town's urban area extends eastwards along Boston Road, which runs from Southgate to the A17 at Kirkby la Thorpe. Except for Boston Road Recreation Ground, the road is straddled by housing west of the railway; developments near the centre are mostly 18th- and 19th-century, while those around Old Place, at the Hoplands and south of Boston Road are mostly planned 20th- or 21st-century residential estates.

The Victorian train station can be found near the southernmost end of Southgate; Station Road includes some converted 19th-century warehouses. Mareham Lane heads south out of the town, past the vast disused Bass Maltings complex. Also forking off from Southgate are Grantham Road and London Road, which fan out in a south-west direction. They link Sleaford with Quarrington village, which has a historic core that has been merged into the town's urban area by modern housing developments. The earliest suburban housing at the base of Southgate appeared in the 19th century and was known as New Quarrington. Ribbon development along London and Grantham roads is mostly early-20th-century; much larger planned developments took place in the late 20th and 21st centuries at Quarrington Hill, Southfields and between the two roads. To the town centre's west is Westgate, medieval in origin but heavily developed with dense terraced housing in the 19th century; to its north is Westholme, parkland which houses a school; south of Westgate is West Banks and its adjoining streets, between the River Slea and the Nine-Foot Drain, an area heavily built up in the 19th century. South of Westbanks are the remains of Sleaford Castle.

Outside of the town's urban area, but included in the civil parish boundaries is Greylees, a settlement built in the early 21st century on the site of the former Rauceby Hospital.

=== Topography and geology ===
Sleaford occupies a position on the Lincoln Heath, a limestone plateau between the Lincoln Cliff to the west (a Limestone scarp running north–south through Lindsey and Kesteven), and the Fens to the east, a low-lying region of the East of England which has been drained to reveal nutrient-rich soils that form some of the most productive farmland in the country.

The town centre lies about 49 feet (15 m) above sea level and has formed around the River Slea, which runs west to north-east through it. A band of Jurassic Cornbrash limestone forms the bedrock under Holdingham (where the ground rises to 82 feet (25 m) above sea level in places), parts of central Sleaford, and most of the housing at Quarrington (where elevations exceed over 98 feet (30 m) at Quarrington Hill) and southern Greylees. The bedrock on the eastern parts of the town comprises Jurassic Kellaways sandstone and siltstone. To the west, the Slea follows a shallow valley underlain by Jurassic Blisworth clay and limestone and, at its lowest elevations at Quarrington Fen and Boiling Wells Farm, earlier Jurassic Rutland argillaceous rocks and Upper Lincolnshire limestone. Greylees and the northern fringe of the Quarrington Hill estate sit on the southern edge of this valley, on the Blisworth clays and limestone. Alluvium deposits are found along the Slea's course, and sand and gravel of the Sleaford series are found to the east and south. Most of the soil is free-draining, lime-rich and loamy, though some of the eastern parts are on loamy soils with naturally high groundwater.

Two Local Nature Reserves sit within the civil parish boundaries: Lollycocks Field, providing mostly wildflower and wetlands habitats alongside Eastgate, and Mareham Pastures, consisting of wildflower meadows, new woodland, hedges and open grassland. There is also Sleaford Wood in the north of the town and Sleaford Moor to the north-east, near the A17 and A153's Bone Mill Junction.

=== Climate ===
Britain experiences a temperate, maritime climate with warm summers and cool winters. Lincolnshire's position on the east of the British Isles allows for a sunnier and warmer climate relative to the national average, and it is one of the driest counties in the UK. In Sleaford, the average daily high temperature peaks at 22.1 °C (71.8 °F) in July and a peak average daily mean of 17.2 °C (63.0 °F) occurs in July. The lowest daily mean temperature is 4.1 °C (39.4 °F) in January; the average daily high for that month is 7.0 °C (44.6 °F) and the daily low is 1.3 °C (34.3 °F) (the latter also occurs in February). The East of England tends to be sheltered from strong winds relative to the north and west of the country. Despite this, tornadoes form more often in the East of England than elsewhere; Sleaford suffered them in 2006 and 2012.

Climate data for Cranwell WMO ID: 03379; coordinates 53°01′52″N 0°30′13″W; elevation: 62 m (203 ft); 1991–2020 normals, extremes 1930–present
Month	Jan	Feb	Mar	Apr	May	Jun	Jul	Aug	Sep	Oct	Nov	Dec	Year
Record high °C (°F)	15.0 (59.0)	18.3 (64.9)	23.2 (73.8)	26.3 (79.3)	32.3 (90.1)	36.4 (97.5)	39.9 (103.8)	35.2 (95.4)	31.6 (88.9)	28.6 (83.5)	18.9 (66.0)	15.7 (60.3)	39.9 (103.8)
Mean daily maximum °C (°F)	7.0 (44.6)	7.8 (46.0)	10.4 (50.7)	13.4 (56.1)	16.5 (61.7)	19.4 (66.9)	22.1 (71.8)	21.8 (71.2)	18.6 (65.5)	14.3 (57.7)	9.9 (49.8)	7.2 (45.0)	14.1 (57.4)
Daily mean °C (°F)	4.1 (39.4)	4.6 (40.3)	6.5 (43.7)	8.9 (48.0)	11.8 (53.2)	14.8 (58.6)	17.2 (63.0)	17.0 (62.6)	14.3 (57.7)	10.8 (51.4)	6.9 (44.4)	4.4 (39.9)	10.1 (50.2)
Mean daily minimum °C (°F)	1.3 (34.3)	1.3 (34.3)	2.6 (36.7)	4.5 (40.1)	7.2 (45.0)	10.2 (50.4)	12.2 (54.0)	12.2 (54.0)	10.1 (50.2)	7.2 (45.0)	3.9 (39.0)	1.6 (34.9)	6.2 (43.2)
Record low °C (°F)	−15.7 (3.7)	−13.9 (7.0)	−11.1 (12.0)	−4.8 (23.4)	−2.2 (28.0)	0.0 (32.0)	4.5 (40.1)	3.3 (37.9)	−0.6 (30.9)	−4.4 (24.1)	−8.0 (17.6)	−11.2 (11.8)	−15.7 (3.7)
Average precipitation mm (inches)	48.1 (1.89)	38.4 (1.51)	36.3 (1.43)	44.6 (1.76)	48.4 (1.91)	59.8 (2.35)	53.5 (2.11)	59.5 (2.34)	50.5 (1.99)	62.4 (2.46)	56.6 (2.23)	54.6 (2.15)	612.6 (24.12)
Average precipitation days (≥ 1.0 mm)	10.9	9.5	9.3	9.0	8.6	9.4	9.1	9.6	8.7	10.3	11.3	11.0	116.7
Mean monthly sunshine hours	65.1	83.7	124.2	163.0	209.2	191.6	202.2	187.6	151.1	113.6	74.4	65.6	1,631.3
Source 1: Met Office
Source 2: Starlings Roost Weather

== History ==
=== Etymology ===
The earliest records of the place-name Sleaford are found in a charter of 852 as Slioford and in the Anglo-Saxon Chronicle as Sliowaford. In the Domesday Book (1086), it is recorded as Eslaforde and in the early 13th century as Sliforde. In the 13th century Book of Fees it appears as Lafford. The name is formed from the Old English words sliow and ford, together meaning "ford over a muddy or slimy river".

=== Early period ===
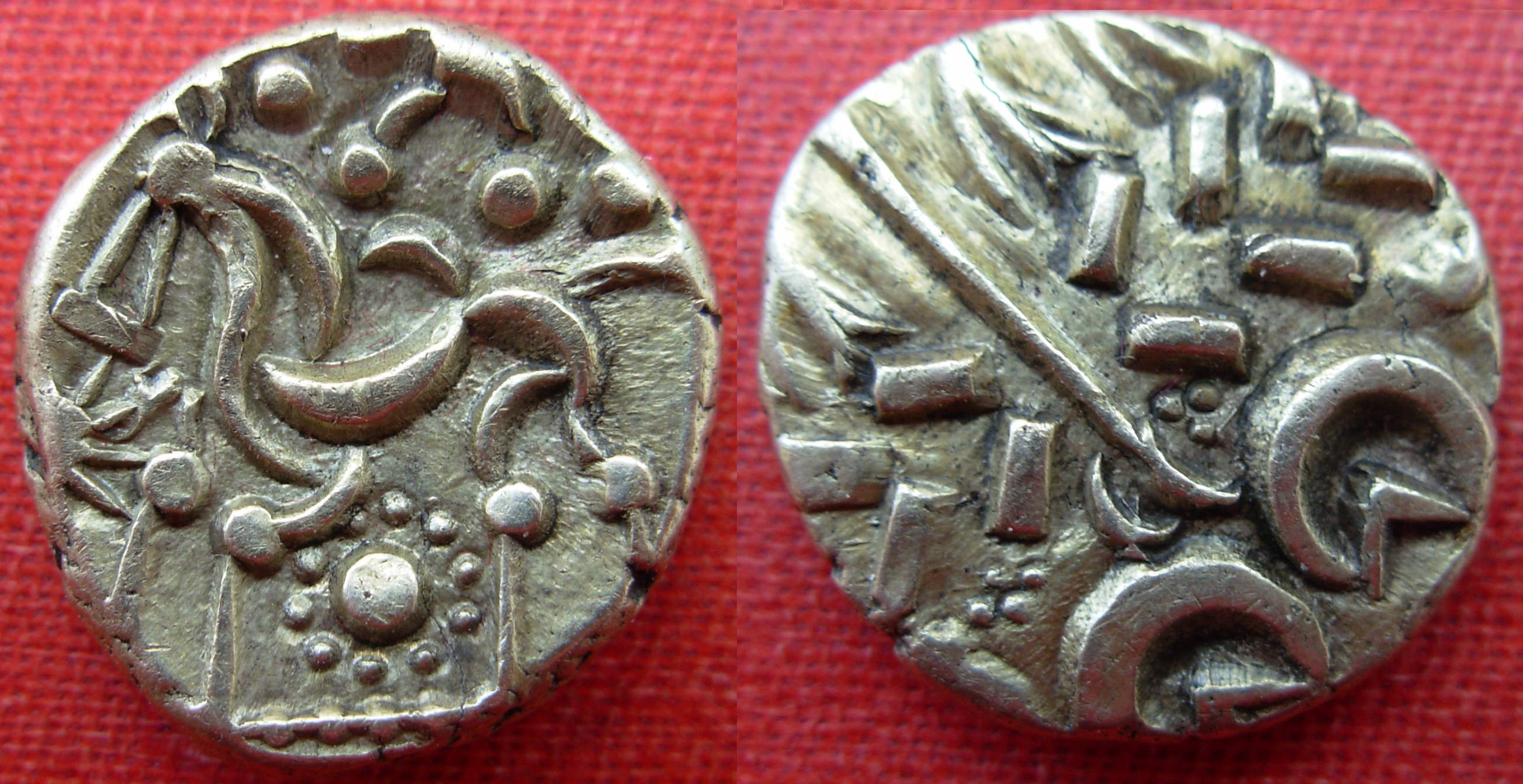
An electrum stater of the Corieltauvi, probably struck at Sleaford in the mid-1st century BC

Archaeological material from the Bronze Age and earlier has been recovered and excavations have shown there was unsustained late-Neolithic and Bronze Age human activity in the vicinity. The earliest known permanent settlement dates from the Iron Age, where a track northwards from Bourne crossed the River Slea. Although only sparse pottery evidence has been found for the middle Iron Age period, 4,290 pellet mould fragments, probably used for minting and dated to 50 BC–AD 50, have been uncovered south-east of the modern town centre, south of a crossing of the River Slea and near Mareham Lane in Old Sleaford. The largest of its kind in Europe, the deposit has led archaeologists to consider that the site in Old Sleaford was one of the largest Corieltauvian settlements in the period and possibly a tribal centre.

During the Roman occupation of Britain (AD 43–409), the settlement was "extensive and of considerable importance". It may have been an economic and administrative centre for stewards and owners of fenland estates. There are signs of a road connecting Old Sleaford to Heckington, where Roman tile kilns have been uncovered and may imply the presence of a market. When the first roads were built by the Romans, Sleaford was bypassed as "less conveniently located" and more "geared to native needs". A smaller road, Mareham Lane, which the Romans renewed, ran through Old Sleaford, and south along the fen edge towards Bourne. Where it passed through Old Sleaford, excavations have shown a large Roman domestic residence, associated farm buildings and field systems, and several burials. Other Roman remains, including a burial, have been excavated.

=== Middle Ages ===
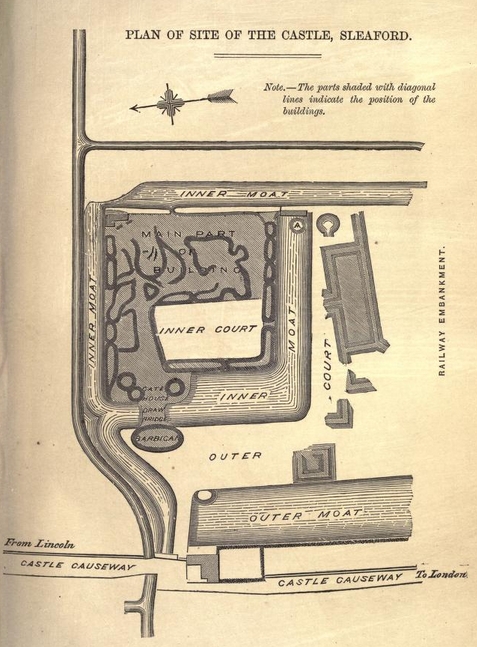
A plan of Sleaford Castle

There is little evidence of continuous settlement between the late Roman and Anglo-Saxon periods but the Saxons did establish themselves eventually. South of the modern town, a 6th- to 7th-century cemetery has been uncovered with an estimated 600 burials, many showing signs of pagan rites. The now-ruined church at Old Sleaford has been discovered and excavations of the market place have uncovered Anglo-Saxon remains from the 8th–9th centuries, indicating some form of enclosure with domestic features.

The earliest documentary reference to Sleaford occurs in a 9th-century charter, when it was owned by Medehamstede Abbey in Peterborough, a Mercian royal foundation. There is little evidence of estate structure until the late Saxon period, but there may have been a market and court before the Norman Conquest, and it may have been an economic and jurisdictional centre for surrounding settlements. The Slea played a big part in the town's economy: it never ran dry or froze, and by the 11th century it supported a dozen watermills. The mills and others in nearby Quarrington and the lost hamlet of Millsthorpe formed the "most important mill cluster in Lincolnshire".

In the later Middle Ages, the Romano-British settlement became known as Old Sleaford, while New Sleaford was a settlement centred on St Denys' Church and the market place. The Domesday Book of 1086 has two entries under Eslaforde (Sleaford) recording land held by Ramsey Abbey and the Bishop of Lincoln. (Note: The Bishop succeeded a Saxon thegn, Bardi, and held 11 carucates with 29 villeins, 11 borders, 6 sokeman, a church and priest, and 8 mills, 1 acre (0.4 hectares) of woodland, 320 acres (130 hectares) of meadow and 330 acres (130 hectares) of marsh. Ramsey Abbey had been granted land in Sleaford and surrounding villages in about 1051. By Domesday its fee called Eslaforde consisted of 1 carucate, 1 sokeman, 2 villeins and 27 acres (11 hectares) of meadow; it was sokeland of the abbot of Ramsey's manor of Quarrington, where he is recorded holding two churches.) The location of these manors is unclear. One theory endorsed by Maurice Beresford is that they focused on the settlement at Old Sleaford, due to evidence that New Sleaford was planted in the 12th century by the bishop to increase his income, (Note: This hypothesis was based on the topography, the granting of a fair, market and burgage tenure in the 12th century, and the "Old" and "New" epithets) a development associated with the construction of Sleaford Castle (1123–39). Beresford's theory has been criticised by the historians Christine Mahany and David Roffe (Note: The earliest references to Old and New Sleaford occur in 13th-century documents, which limits their use as evidence for town plantation; the grants of a market and fair in the 12th century do not necessarily indicate a new settlement, but merely a codification and rationalisation of pre-existing arrangements. The diversion of roads like Mareham Lane and the compass-aligned streets provide no chronology even if they imply a westward migration from Old Sleaford.) who have reinterpreted the Domesday material and argued that in 1086 the Bishop's manor included the church and associated settlement which became "New" Sleaford.

A charter to hold a fair on the feast day of St Denis was granted by King Stephen to Alexander, Bishop of Lincoln, in 1136–1140. Between 1154 and 1165, Henry II granted the bishop of Lincoln the right to hold a market at Sleaford and Edward III confirmed this in 1329. The town later had at least two guilds comparable to those found in developed towns. However, there was no formal charter outlining the town's freedoms; tight control by the bishops meant the economy was mainly geared to serve them. It thus retained a strong tradition of demesne farming well into the 14th century. A survey of burgage tenure from 1258 survives, analysis of which indicates that demesne farming centred on the hamlet of Holdingham. As the economic initiative passed more to burgesses and middlemen who formed ties with nearby towns such as Boston, evidence suggests that Sleaford developed a locally important role in the wool trade. In the Lay Subsidy of 1334, New Sleaford was the wealthiest settlement in the Flaxwell wapentake, with a value of £16 0s. 8^{1}/_{4}d. Meanwhile, Old Sleaford, an "insignificant" place since the end of the Roman period, declined and may have been deserted by the 16th century.

=== Early modern period ===
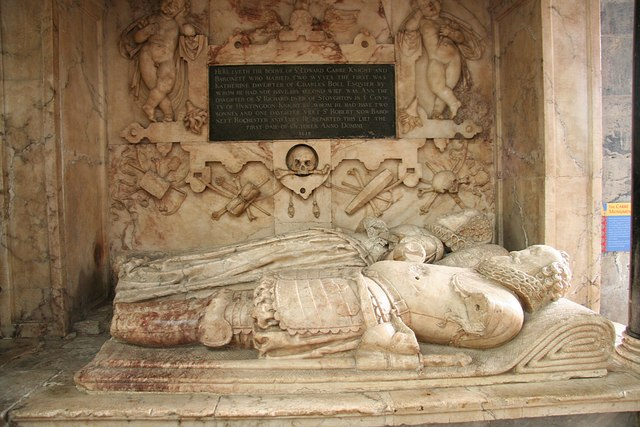
The tomb of Sir Edward Carre (died 1618) in St Denys' Church

The manor of Old Sleaford was owned in the late 15th and early 16th centuries by the Hussey family. John Hussey, 1st Baron Hussey of Sleaford was executed for treason for his part in the Lincolnshire Rising; the manor and his residence at Old Place reverted to the Crown and were later sold to Robert Carre, the son of George Carre or Carr, a wool merchant originally from Northumberland who had settled in Sleaford by 1522. Robert also bought the castle and manor of New Sleaford from Edward Clinton, 1st Earl of Lincoln. (Note: It was previously sold by the Bishops of Lincoln to Edward Seymour, 1st Duke of Somerset and reverted to the crown on his attainder in 1549; Queen Mary I later sold it to Edward Clinton, 1st Earl of Lincoln.) His eldest surviving son Robert founded Carre's Grammar School in 1604, and his youngest son Edward was created a baronet; his son founded Sleaford Hospital in 1636. The last male descendant died in 1683 and the heiress, Isabella, married John Hervey, 1st Earl of Bristol, in whose family the estates remained until the 1970s. The Carres and Herveys had a strong influence: while extracting dues from their tenants, they enforced their monopoly on charging tolls on market and cattle traders and for driving animals through the town.

Industry was slow to take hold. By the second half of the 18th century, Cogglesford Mill was the only working corn mill in the town. An old mill at the junction of Westgate and Castle Causeway supplied hemp to the rope-making business of the Foster and Hill families. As the local historian Simon Pawley wrote, "In many respects, things had changed little [by 1783] since the survey of 1692," with few of the buildings or infrastructure being improved. Major changes to agriculture and industry took place in the last decade of that century. Sleaford's three medieval open fields (North, West and Sleaford Fields) were enclosed in 1794, with over 90 per cent of the 1,096 acres (444 hectares) of the open land being granted to Lord Bristol.

=== Industrial development ===
Sleaford, as it appeared in 1891. The major roads are marked in red; railways in grey and rivers in blue. Key: (1) Market Place, (2) St Denys' Church, (3) Manor House, (4) Carre's Grammar School, (5) Westholme House, (6) Castle, (7) Station, (8) Old Place, (9) the remains of St Giles's Church, (10) the Union workhouse.

Canalisation of the Slea culminated in the opening of the Sleaford Navigation in 1794. It eased the export of farm produce to the Midlands and the import of coal and oil. Mills along the Slea benefited and wharves were constructed around Carre Street. Between 1829 and 1836 the navigation's toll rights increased in value 27 times over. The railways emerged in the 19th century as an alternative to canals and arrived at the town in 1857, when a line from Grantham to Sleaford opened. This made trading easier and improved communications, (Note: Bricks could also be transported more easily, which contributed to the construction of new buildings on West Banks, Grantham Road and London Road. For a full account of the development of West Banks and adjoining roads, see Stroud & Stroud 1981, pp. 51–65. Station Road and Nag's Head Passage were also developed in this period.) leading to the decline of the Navigation Company whose income from tolls decreased by 80 per cent between 1858 and 1868; it became unprofitable and was abandoned in 1878. The town's rural location and transport links led in the late 19th century to the rise of two local seed merchants: Hubbard and Phillips, and Charles Sharpe; the former took over the Navigation Wharves, and the latter was trading in the US and Europe by the 1880s. The advent of steam power led Kirk and Parry to open a large steam-powered flour mill in 1857 and provided the basis of Ward and Dale's factory, which made steam cultivators for farming. The railway, Sleaford's rural location and its artesian wells, were key factors in the development of the 13-acre (5-hectare) Bass & Co maltings complex at Mareham Lane (1892–1905).

New Sleaford's population more than doubled from 1,596 in 1801 to 3,539 in 1851. Coinciding with this is the construction or extension of public buildings, often by the local contractors Charles Kirk and Thomas Parry. (Note: The principle buildings were the Sessions House (1831), the grammar school (1834), Carre's Hospital (1830–1846), the gasworks (1839), Navigation House (1838–39), much of Eastgate (including the Alvey School in 1850, and Kingston and Lafford Terraces in 1856 and 1857), the cemetery (1856) and the corn exchange (1857)) The gasworks opened in 1839 to provide lighting in the town. Sleaford's Poor Law Union was formed in 1836 to cater for the town and the surrounding 54 parishes. A workhouse was built by 1838, able to house 181 inmates. Despite these advances, the slums around Westgate were crowded, lacking in sanitation and ridden by disease; Northgate, as the entry point from the north along the turnpike, had also attracted notoriety for its taverns, lodging houses and brothels in the early 19th century: it was the "plague spot of the town". The local administration failed to deal with these issues, prompting a heavily critical report by the General Board of Health, which set up a Local Board of Health in 1850 to undertake public works. By the 1880s, Lord Bristol had allowed the Board to pump clean water into the town, though engineering problems and his reluctance to sell land to house a pumping station had delayed the introduction of sewers. In the meantime, despite Anglicans dominating official institutions, non-conformist chapels were flourishing in the poorest parts of the town, at Westgate from the early 19th century and at Northgate after 1848, where they sought to provide spiritual care and education. Temperance was so prominent in the town that an aerated water factory, Lee and Green, opened in c. 1883 and became one of Sleaford's most important manufacturers.

=== Twentieth century and beyond ===
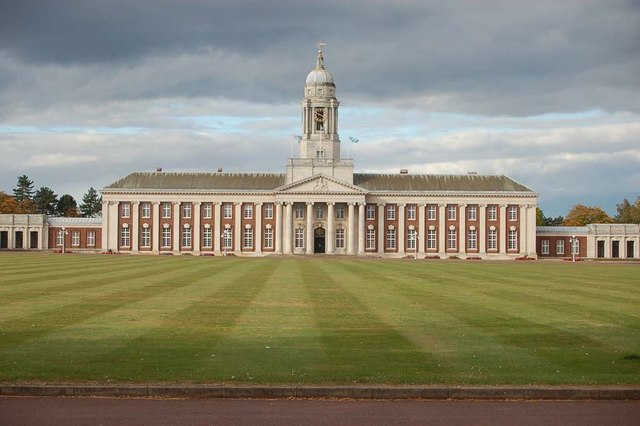
Officer Training School at RAF Cranwell, near Sleaford.

Although hardly damaged in the First and Second World Wars, (Note: A Zeppelin raid passed overhead in 1916.) Sleaford has close links with the Royal Air Force due to proximity to several RAF bases, including RAF Cranwell, RAF Digby and RAF Waddington. Lincolnshire's topography – flat and open countryside – and its location in the east of the country made it ideal for the airfields being constructed in the First World War. Work began on Cranwell in late 1915; it was designated an RAF base in 1918 and the RAF College opened in 1920 as the world's first air academy. The Cranwell branch railway linking Sleaford station with the RAF base opened in 1917 and closed in 1956. During the Second World War, Lincolnshire was "the most significant location for bomber command" and Rauceby Hospital, south-west of Sleaford, was requisitioned by the RAF as a specialist burns unit which the plastic surgeon Archibald McIndoe regularly visited.

Sleaford's population remained static between the wars, but the Great Depression in the 1930s caused unemployment to rise. The Council housing put up along Drove Lane proved insufficient for the low-income families after the Westgate slums were cleared in the 1930s; Jubilee Grove opened in that decade to meet the demand.. In the post-war period, there were housing developments at St Giles Avenue, the Hoplands, Russell Crescent, Jubilee Grove and Grantham Road. Parts of the town were redeveloped: in 1958, the Bristol Arms Arcade opened, the Corn Exchange was demolished in the 1960s and the Riverside Shopping Precinct opened in 1973, as did Flaxwell House, designed to house a department store, though later becoming the national headquarters for Interflora. Old industries departed; Ward and Dale closed down in 1939 and Lee and Green around the 1940s; Bass shut the maltings in 1959, and Hubbard and Phillips's pea-sorting factory closed in 1972. New industrial estates and business parks were built off East Road in the late 20th century.

By 1979, the major landowner, Victor Hervey, 6th Marquess of Bristol, was heavily in debt and sold most of his estates in Sleaford and Quarrington. The estate office closed in 1989. Much of the land went to property developers and subsequent decades brought new housing and a considerable rise in population. According to a council report, people were attracted to the town by "the quality of life, low crime rates, relatively low house prices and good-quality education". From 1981 to 2011, Sleaford's population more than doubled; the growth rate in 1991–2001 was the fastest of any town in the county. The infrastructure struggled to cope, especially with increased traffic congestion. Two bypasses opened and a one-way system was introduced. Between 1995 and 2001, the Single Regeneration Budget granted over £10 million to Sleaford to deliver 13 major regeneration programmes collectively known as "Sleaford Pride", including improvements to the town centre, the conversion of the old Navigation stables, and the development of The Hub arts centre (opened 2002) on the site of a former Hubbard and Phillips seed warehouse.

The Cinema Museum in London holds a significant amount of material filmed in Sleaford in the early 1960's.

== Economy ==
The Sleaford built-up area is the urban centre of the North Kesteven district, and one of the district's centres of employment. According to a local authority report, Sleaford is also "the main retail, service and employment centre for people living in the town and in the surrounding villages". The town's primary employment zones are Sleaford Enterprise Park, the adjoining business park at Woodbridge Road and along East Road, and the town centre (focused on Southgate, Northgate and the Market Place). Many of North Kesteven's residents also commute out of the district to work, including to Lincoln, Grantham and Newark-on-Trent; one study found that, in 2011, 70% of workers living in the housing built at Quarrington since the 1980s worked outside of Sleaford: 24% of the total in other parts of North Kesteven, 13% in South Kesteven, 8% in Lincoln, and the remainder mostly in other districts of the East Midlands.

=== Retail and services ===
Sleaford is a retail and services hub for its own population and its rural hinterland. It has a long history of providing services for the wider district; despite the emergence of industries in the town in the 19th century, employment "revolved around services, trades and commerce" through the 20th century. In 2021, retail, accommodation and food services made up 21% of the town's workforce. The town centre hosts many shops and services, including those in the covered Bristol Arcade (opened in 1958) and the Riverside Centre (opened in 1973). Supermarkets are in the town centre, Northgate, Lincoln Road and Stump Cross Hill. Other retailers and wholesalers operate on East Road and the business parks. Sleaford's cattle and poultry markets closed in the 1980s; although the weekly market (traditionally held in the Market Place) has reduced substantially in size, as of 2025 it continues to be held weekly on Fridays, Saturdays and Mondays, and a farmers' market is held on the first Saturday of each month.

In 2011, the district council found that Sleaford's retail and service offer had not kept pace with its growing population, leading many shoppers to travel elsewhere to buy high-value goods, use services or engage in leisure activities: 85p in every pound spent on higher-value comparison goods were spent outside of the town. In 2015, another report estimated that 23% of shopping spend in Sleaford's catchment area was spent in the town (accounting for £62m spending); although the town had 210 shops and a higher ratio of shops to residents than many other urban areas in the region, these were dominated by outlets selling convenience goods and services. The ratio of "multiple" brand shops compared to independent shops was 20% lower in Sleaford compared with regional benchmarks, which was thought to be a factor driving consumer spending out of the town; Lincoln was believed to be the key beneficiary of this outflow. To address this, the district council proposed creating a new "retail anchor" at the disused Bass Maltings, improving parking, removing parts of the one-way system, and regenerating Southgate and Money's Yard. Though the maltings project stalled after an investor withdrew in 2015, the Riverside Centre was refurbished in 2017 and town centre regeneration continues as of 2024.

=== Public administration ===
As local government expanded in the late 19th and 20th centuries and RAF Cranwell opened, the public sector became increasingly important to Sleaford's economy. From the early 20th century, the town housed the headquarters of Kesteven County Council, East Kesteven Rural District Council and the town's Urban District Council. By 1939, 18% of its employed population were in public administration and defence. In the 21st century, the public sector is the predominant form of employment in Sleaford civil parish; public administration, education and healthcare collectively accounted for 37% of the workforce in 2021. As of 2024, Sleaford is home to the headquarters of North Kesteven District Council, as well as four primary schools and three secondary schools, and is near RAF bases at Cranwell, Digby and Waddington which are major employers in the district.

=== Industry and commerce ===
Sleaford's position as a market town serving a rural district supported some local craft industries before the mid-19th century. The canalisation of the Slea and then the arrival of the railways in the 19th century meant that the town became important in the supply of agricultural produce inland and the import of industrial products into the wider district. Several large scale industries, some closely connected to agriculture, emerged in the late 19th and early 20th centuries, including malting, seed sorting and agricultural implement making. Many heavier industries closed between the 1920s and 1960s; the local authority encouraged lighter manufacturing after the 1950s through the provision of land for an industrial estate off East Road, which has since expanded. By 2021, manufacturing employed 10% of Sleaford's workforce, construction employed 8.4%, and transport and distribution 6%; the professional, administrative, financial and real estate sectors accounted for a combined 10.6% of the workforce.

In the early 2020s, Sleaford includes one of the district council's three "strategic employment locations", Sleaford Enterprise Park, which is adjacent to other business parks at Woodbridge Road and East Road. In 2023, the district council opened the first units of an extension, Sleaford Moor Enterprise Park. Combined, in 2024 these estates housed at least 95 businesses, according to Google Maps; these included: 11 wholesalers, builders' merchants or plumbers' merchants; 11 vehicle repair shops or MOT centres; 11 furniture and furnishings shops; 7 manufacturers, including Sleaford Quality Foods (a food producer) and the ingredients' maker, J. L. Priestley and Co; five vehicle dealerships; four plant and equipment suppliers; four tyre shops; two gyms; a dance studio; and a bus company, Sleafordian Coaches.

== Demography ==
Population changes of Sleaford (Note: These figures relate to the area of the Sleaford civil parish as defined in 1974. For the years before 1974, they relate to the civil parish's predecessor, the Sleaford Urban District, which existed between 1894 and 1974. For the years before 1894, they are the sum of the resident populations of the ancient/civil parishes of New Sleaford, Old Sleaford, Quarrington and (after it was separated from New Sleaford in 1866) Holdingham.)

Year	Population	±%
1801	1,812	—
1811	2,189	+20.8%
1821	2,567	+17.3%
1831	3,043	+18.5%
1841	3,963	+30.2%
1851	4,160	+5.0%
1861	4,138	−0.5%
1871	4,472	+8.1%
1881	4,965	+11.0%
1891	4,655	−6.2%
1901	5,468	+17.5%
1911	6,427	+17.5%

Year	Population	±%
1921	6,690	+4.1%
1931	7,025	+5.0%
1939	7,835	+11.5%
1951	7,680	−2.0%
1961	7,844	+2.1%
1971	7,975	+1.7%
1981	8,746	+9.7%
1991	10,216	+16.8%
2001	14,494	+41.9%
2011	17,671	+21.9%
2021	19,815	+12.1%

Source: (Note: Figures for 1801–1901, except 1861 and 1871, are taken from: "New Sleaford CP/AP". Vision of Britain. University of Portsmouth. Archived from the original on 28 November 2023.; "Old Sleaford CP/AP". Vision of Britain. University of Portsmouth. Archived from the original on 2 June 2024.; "Quarrington CP/AP". Vision of Britain. University of Portsmouth. Archived from the original on 30 May 2024.; "Holdingham CP/Hmt". Vision of Britain. University of Portsmouth. Archived from the original on 30 May 2024.; The following other sources have been used for particular years: The figures for 1911 to 1961 are from "Sleaford UD". Vision of Britain. University of Portsmouth. Archived from the original on 30 May 2024.; The figures for 1861 and 1871 are based on combining the populations for Old Sleaford, New Sleaford and Holdingham parishes, as recorded in Census Office 1862, pp. 517, 850 and Census Office 1873, pp. 654, 685, 700, 710, 729; The figures for 1971, 1981 and 1991 are from Office of Population Censuses and Surveys 1984, p. 16 and Office of Population Censuses and Surveys 1994, p. 28; The figure for 2001 is from "2001 Census Key Statistics Report: Sleaford". Nomis: Official Labour Market Statistics. Office for National Statistics.; The figure for 2011 is from "Sleaford Parish: Local Area Report". Nomis: Official Labour Market Statistics. Office for National Statistics.; The figure for 2021 has been obtained by querying the PP002 Dataset from the 2021 Census via Nomis: Official Labour Market Statistics. Office for National Statistics. Retrieved 2 June 2024.)

Population changes of New Sleaford ancient/civil parish (Note: These figures include Holdingham before 1866. The figures excluding Holdingham hamlet were: 1,483 (1801), 1,781 (1811), 2,094 (1821), 2,450 (1831), 3,184 (1841), 3,372 (1851), and 3,325 (1861).)

Year	Population	±%
1801	1,596	—
1811	1,904	+19.3%
1821	2,220	+16.6%
1831	2,587	+16.5%
1841	3,382	+30.7%
1851	3,539	+4.6%
1861	3,467	−2.0%
1871	3,592	+3.6%

Year	Population	±%
1881	3,955	+10.1%
1891	3,597	−9.1%
1901	3,839	+6.7%
1911	3,808	−0.8%
1921	3,984	+4.6%
1931	4,116	+3.3%
1951	4,850	+17.8%

=== Population change ===
In 1563 there were 145 households in New Sleaford (including 20 in Holdingham), plus 10 in Old Sleaford and 17 in Quarrington. In the late 17th and early 18th centuries, the diocese recorded that there were "more than 250 families" in the ecclesiastical parish of Sleaford, with a further 35 in the parish of Quarrington. One estimate puts the population of New Sleaford at 800 to 900 at this time. The first official census was conducted in 1801 and recorded a population of 1,596 in New Sleaford (including Holdingham); combined with Old Sleaford and Quarrington, this gave a population of 1,812 in the area covered by today's Sleaford civil parish. (Note: The figures for the three parishes are from: * "New Sleaford CP/AP". Vision of Britain. University of Portsmouth. Archived from the original on 28 November 2023.: "Old Sleaford CP/AP". Vision of Britain. University of Portsmouth. Archived from the original on 2 June 2024.; "Quarrington CP/AP". Vision of Britain. University of Portsmouth. Archived from the original on 30 May 2024.; The figures for 1861 and 1871 are based on combining the populations for Old Sleaford, New Sleaford and Holdingham parishes, as recorded in Census Office 1862, pp. 517, 850 and Census Office 1873, pp. 654, 685, 700, 710, 729. For the period after 1871, see "Sleaford UD". Vision of Britain. University of Portsmouth. Archived from the original on 30 May 2024.) Following the opening of Sleaford Navigation in 1794 and the flourishing of the town's economy this produced (combined with the effects of inflated agricultural prices during the Napoleonic wars), Sleaford's population rose steadily in the first half of the 19th century. It totalled 3,539 in New Sleaford and 4,160 across all the three parishes by 1851. The population grew much more slowly between the 1850s and the 1880s, before witnessing further growth that took the urban district's population to 6,427 by 1911 (incorporating New Sleaford, Old Sleaford, Holdingham and Quarrington).

Slower rates were recorded for the urban district between then and the 1931 census, though the pace picked up again in the 1930s; by the outbreak of the Second World War in 1939 there were 7,835 residents. Sleaford's population grew very slowly in the post-war years, reaching 7,975 by 1971, largely due to the fact that Lord Bristol remained owner of the vast majority of the undeveloped land around the town. However, as the 6th Marquess sold the land from the 1960s onwards and speculative housing blossomed around Sleaford, the civil parish's population expanded rapidly; the population growth rate between 1991 and 2001 was the fastest of any town in Lincolnshire. Between 1981 and 2011, the population more than doubled, reaching 17,671; this had risen by a further 12% to 19,815 by the 2021 census. This accounts for 17% of North Kesteven's population, making Sleaford the most populous civil parish in the district.

=== Ethnicity, nationality and religion ===
According to the 2021 census, Sleaford's population was 96% White; 1% Asian/British Asian; 1% mixed; and less than 1% Black, African, Caribbean, Black British, or other ethnicities. The population is less ethnically diverse than England as a whole, where 81% were White; 10% Asian/British Asian; 4% Black, African, Caribbean or Black British; 3% mixed; and 2% other. Parish-level data about country of origin have not been published for the 2021 census. The previous census, in 2011, recorded that 93% of Sleaford's population was born in the United Kingdom (in England as a whole the figure was 86%); 4% was born in European Union countries other than the UK and Ireland (England: 4%). 3% of the population was born outside the EU (England: 9%).

The 2021 census also lacks parish-level data on religion. In 2011, 72% of Sleaford's population said they were religious and 23% said they did not follow a religion (England: 68% and 25% respectively). Compared to England's population, Christians were a much higher proportion of Sleaford's population (70%), and all other groups were present at a lower proportion than the national rates; Muslims were the largest religious minority, accounting for 0.4% of the town's residents compared with 5% nationally; all other groups were present in very low numbers.

Ethnicity (2021) and nationality and religious affiliation (2011)
	White	Asian or British Asian	Black, African, Caribbean or Black British	Mixed or multi-ethnic	Other ethnicity	Born in UK	Born in EU (except UK and Ireland)	Born outside EU	Religious	Did not follow a religion	Christian	Muslim	Other religions
Sleaford	96.3%	1.4%	0.4%	1.4%	0.5%	92.7%	4.3%	2.6%	71.6%	21.7%	70.3%	0.4%	1.0%
England	81.0%	9.6%	4.2%	3.0%	2.2%	86.2%	3.7%	9.4%	68.1%	24.7%	59.4%	5.0%	2.5%

=== Household composition, age, health and housing ===
Gender, age, health and household characteristics (2011)
Characteristics	Sleaford	England
Male	48.4%	49.2%
Female	51.6%	50.8%
Married (Note: Residents aged 16 and over)	50.3%	46.6%
Single	28.9%	34.6%
Divorced	10.5%	9.0%
Widowed	7.1%	6.9%
One-person households	29.2%	30.2%
One-family households	65.4%	61.8%
Mean age	40.0	39.3
Median age	41.0	39.0
Population under 20	24.3%	24.0%
Population over 60	23.2%	22.0%
Residents in good or very good health	82.1%	81.4%
Owner-occupiers (Note: Households)	68.5%	63.3%
Private renters	15.8%	16.8%
Social renters	13.8%	17.7%
Living in a detached house	39.2%	22.3%

Parish-level data about household composition, age and housing have not yet been published for the 2021 census. In the 2011 census, 48% of the population were male and 52% female. Of the population over 16, 50% were married (England: 47%); 29% were single (England: 35%), 11% divorced (England: 9%), 7% widowed (England: 7%), 3% separated and <1% in same-sex civil partnerships (England: 3% and <1% respectively). In 2011, there were 7,653 households in Sleaford civil parish. It had a roughly average proportion of one-person households (29%; England: 30%); most other households consisted of one family (65% of the total; England: 62%).

The 2011 census found the mean age was 40 and the median 41, compared with 39 and 39 for England. 24% of the population was under 20 (England: 24%), and 23% of Sleaford's population was aged over 60 (England: 22%). 82% of the population were in good or very good health (England: 81%).

In 2011, Sleaford had a higher proportion of owner-occupiers (69%) than in England (63%), a similar proportion of people who privately rent (16%; England: 17%) and a smaller proportion of social renters (14%; England: 18%). The proportion of households in detached houses was higher than average (39%; England: 22%), while the proportion in terraced houses (19%; England: 25%) and purpose-built flats (9%; England: 17%) was lower.

=== Workforce and deprivation ===
Economic characteristics of residents aged 16 to 74 (2021)
Characteristic	Sleaford	England
Economic activity
Economically active	63.1%	60.9%
Employed	60.6%	57.4%
Economically active but unemployed	2.5%	3.5%
Economically inactive	36.9%	39.1%
Industry
Agriculture, energy and water	2.9%	2.3%
Manufacturing	10.0%	7.3%
Construction	8.4%	8.7%
Retail, hotels and restaurants	21.0%	19.9%
Transport and communication	6.0%	9.7%
Financial, real estate, professional and administration	10.6%	17.4%
Public administration, education and health	37.2%	30.3%
Other	4.0%	4.6%
Occupation
Managers and directors	11.1%	12.9%
Professionals; associate professionals	30.4%	33.6%
Administrative and secretarial occupations	9.8%	9.3%
Skilled trades	10.6%	10.2%
Caring, leisure and other service roles	10.3%	9.3%
Sales and customer service roles	7.6%	7.5%
Process, plant and machine operatives	8.8%	6.9%
Elementary occupations	11.4%	10.5%

In 2021, 63% of Sleaford's residents aged 16 to 74 were economically active (England: 61%) and 61% were in employment (England: 57%). The rate of economically inactive people aged 16 to 74 was 37% (England: 39%). The 2021 census revealed that the most common industries residents worked in were: public administration, education and health (combined 37%; England: 30%), retail, hotels and accommodation (combined 21%; England: 20%), finance, real estate, professional or administrative services (combined 11%; England: 17%), and manufacturing (10%; England: 7%). No other sectors accounted for more than 10% of the population. In terms of occupational composition, in 2021 Sleaford's workforce was broadly similar to the workforce in the whole of England. It has slightly lower proportions of people in professional, associate professional and technical roles (30%) and managerial occupations (11%). There are slightly higher proportions of people in caring, leisure and other service occupations (10%), process, plant and machine operatives (9%), and elementary occupations (11%).

The Indices of Multiple Deprivation (2019) show that North Kesteven contained the lowest level of deprivation of any district in Lincolnshire. The indices divided the Sleaford parish into 10 statistical areas (LSOAs). Of these, five placed in the least-deprived 30% of LSOAs nationally (one in the least-deprived 10% nationally); these were concentrated in Quarrington and the Holdingham ward. However, the eastern part of Holdingham ward and the central parts of the Westholme and Castle wards are among the most-deprived 40% of areas nationally.

== Transport ==
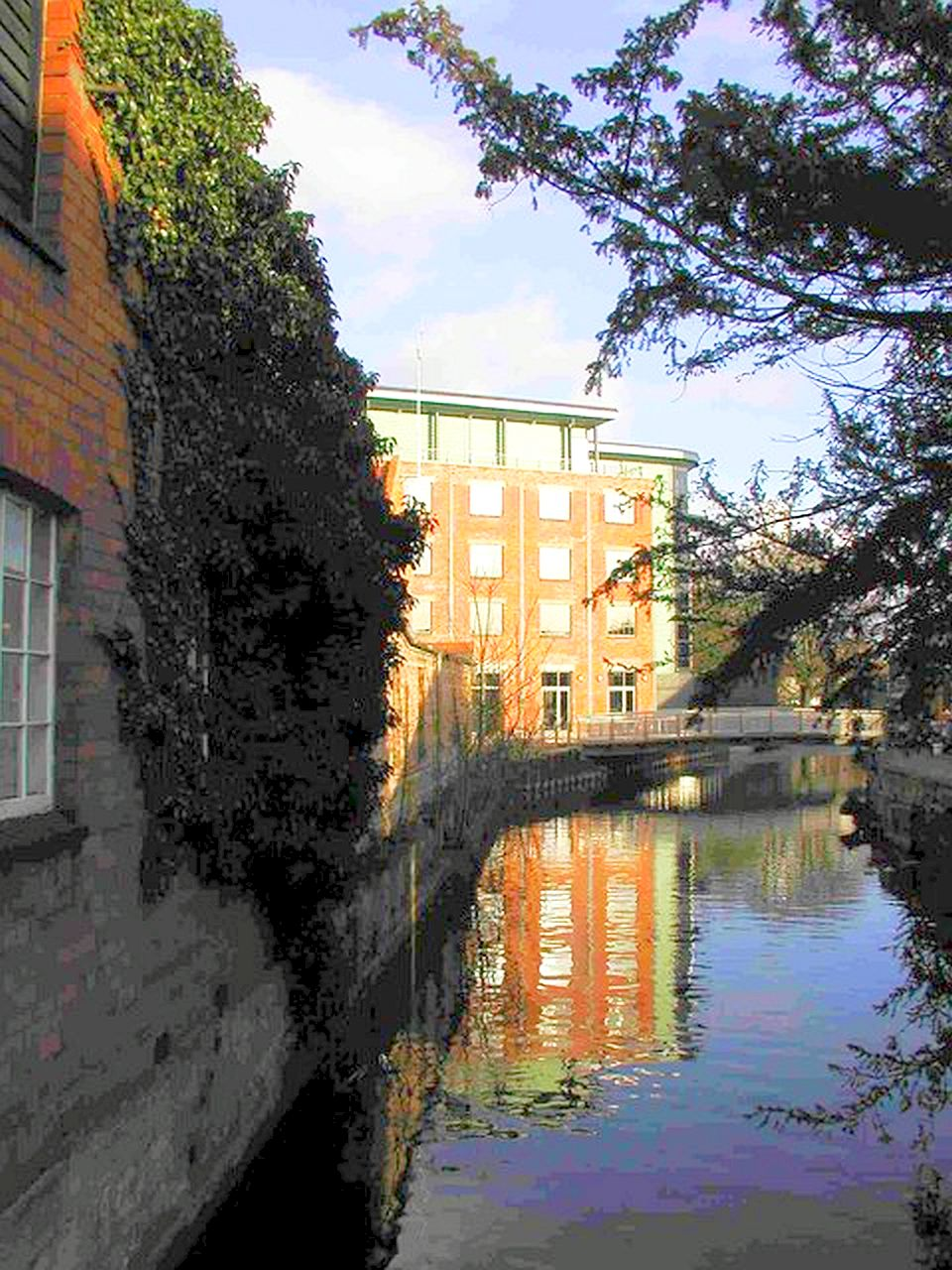
The River Slea in the town was part of the disused Sleaford Navigation canal

The A17 road from Newark-on-Trent to King's Lynn bypasses Sleaford from Holdingham Roundabout to Kirkby la Thorpe. It ran through the town until the bypass opened in 1975. The Holdingham roundabout connects the A17 to the A15 road from Peterborough to Scawby. It also passed through Sleaford until 1993, when its bypass was completed. Three roads meet at Sleaford's market place: Northgate (B1518), Southgate and Eastgate (B1517). A one-way system set up in 1994 creates a circuit around the town centre. The bus companies Stagecoach East Midlands and Sleafordian Coaches operate public buses through and around the town on behalf of the county council, alongside the council's demand-responsive, flexible CallConnect service.

The railways arrived in the 19th century. Early proposals to bring a line to Sleaford failed, (Note: Proposals to link Sleaford to Ancaster for transporting stone in 1827 did not materialise; works by the Ambergate Company in the 1840s should have extended to Sleaford, but stopped at Grantham in 1850, while opposition from the Navigation Company to another proposal further delayed railway links to the town.) but in 1852 plans were made to build the Boston, Sleaford and Midland Counties Railway and its Act of Parliament passed in 1853. The line from Grantham opened in 1857; Boston was connected in 1859, Bourne in 1871 and Ruskington on the Great Northern and Great Eastern Joint Railway in 1882. The line to Bourne was closed in 1965. As of 2024, Sleaford is a stop on the Peterborough to Lincoln Line and the Poacher Line, from Grantham to Skegness. Grantham, roughly 14.75 miles (23.74 kilometres) by road and two stops on the Poacher Line, is a major stop on the East Coast Main Line. Trains from Grantham to London King's Cross take approximately 1 hour 15 minutes.

Plans to canalise the River Slea were drawn up in 1773, but faced opposition from landowners who feared it might affect fenland drainage. Plans were approved in 1791 with the support of the 5th Duke of Ancaster and Kesteven who owned estates and quarries that he hoped would benefit. An Act of Parliament passed in 1792, establishing the Sleaford Navigation, which opened two years later. After falling revenues due to competition from the railways, the navigation company closed in 1878. The river, although no longer navigable, passes under Carre Street and Southgate. The Nine Foot Drain, also unnavigable, meets the Slea just before Southgate.

== Governance ==
=== Local government ===
==== History ====
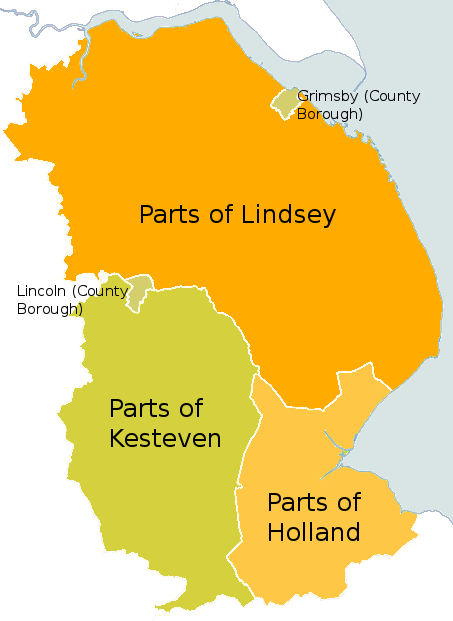
The parts of Lincolnshire, which have medieval origins. They formed the basis of local government until 1974, including (from 1889) Kesteven County Council (KCC). Sleaford was in Kesteven and KCC held its meetings alternately in Sleaford and the other major settlement in Kesteven, Grantham.

From the medieval period, New Sleaford and Old Sleaford were ancient parishes; New Sleaford was in the Flaxwell wapentake and Old Sleaford in the Ashwardhurn one, both in the Kesteven parts of Lincolnshire. New Sleaford contained the main built-up area, and its ancient parish boundaries also included the rural hamlet of Holdingham to the north-west.

Sleaford Poor Law Union, overseen by a Board of Guardians, was founded in 1836 covering Old and New Sleaford and surrounding parishes. The parish of New Sleaford, excluding the hamlet of Holdingham, was made a local board district (LBD) in 1850, governed by an elected local board of health (LBH). Holdingham was made its own civil parish in 1866. The Public Health Act 1872 established urban sanitary districts (USD) to cover the areas in LBDs and made the LBH the urban sanitary authority. The New Sleaford USD was enlarged in 1877 to include Holdingham, Old Sleaford and Quarrington. (Note: The order establishing this arrangement made no mention of Holdingham, but contemporary press reports and the scholar F. A. Youngs state that Holdingham was included in New Sleaford USD.)

The Local Government Act 1894 converted the USD into New Sleaford Urban District, overseen by an urban district council (UDC). In 1900, it was renamed Sleaford Urban District. (Note: The UDC, like its predecessor, met in Sessions House until 1901, after which it used a purpose-built council chamber at Sleaford's fire station in Watergate. From 1919, the UDC also had a depot and stables at Jermyn Street and created a permanent office there in 1927. In 1955, the UDC brought its offices and council chamber under one roof when it moved into Westgate House, where the authority remained until its abolition.) During a reorganisation of local government, Sleaford Urban District was abolished on 1 April 1974, being absorbed into the new district of North Kesteven. A successor parish called Sleaford was created on 6 July 1973 covering the area of the urban district, which had the effect of abolishing the four parishes of Holdingham, New Sleaford, Old Sleaford and Quarrington. The new parish council declared its parish to be a town at its first meeting on 14 November 1973, allowing it to take the style "town council" and letting the chair of the council take the title of mayor.

==== Today ====
Sleaford is in the North Kesteven District of Lincolnshire (coloured red on this map).

There are three tiers of local government covering Sleaford: Sleaford Town Council, North Kesteven District Council and Lincolnshire County Council. County councils have statutory responsibility for some public services, including education, transport, libraries, planning and social care. District councils manage social housing, planning applications, council tax, and waste and recycling. Town councils have powers to run some local amenities. (Note: Sleaford Town Council owns and manages the town cemetery, as well as the Boston Road Recreation Ground and six other public open spaces; it also manages the market, Eastgate Car Park, the town's allotments on The Drove and Galley Hill, and several bus stops, public toilets, and street lighting and furniture.) Since the 2023 local elections, the town council has been composed of 18 councillors from five wards. (Note: These are: Sleaford Castle (3 seats), Sleaford Holdingham (2 seats), Sleaford Navigation (3 seats), Sleaford Quarrington (7 seats) and Sleaford Westholme (3 seats).) There are seven representatives from five wards on the district council, as of 2023. (Note: Sleaford Castle (1 seat), Sleaford Holdingham (1 seat), Sleaford Navigation (1 seat), Sleaford Quarrington and Mareham (3 seats), and Sleaford Westholme (1 seat).) Under the most recently devised boundaries, Sleaford has one seat on Lincolnshire County Council.

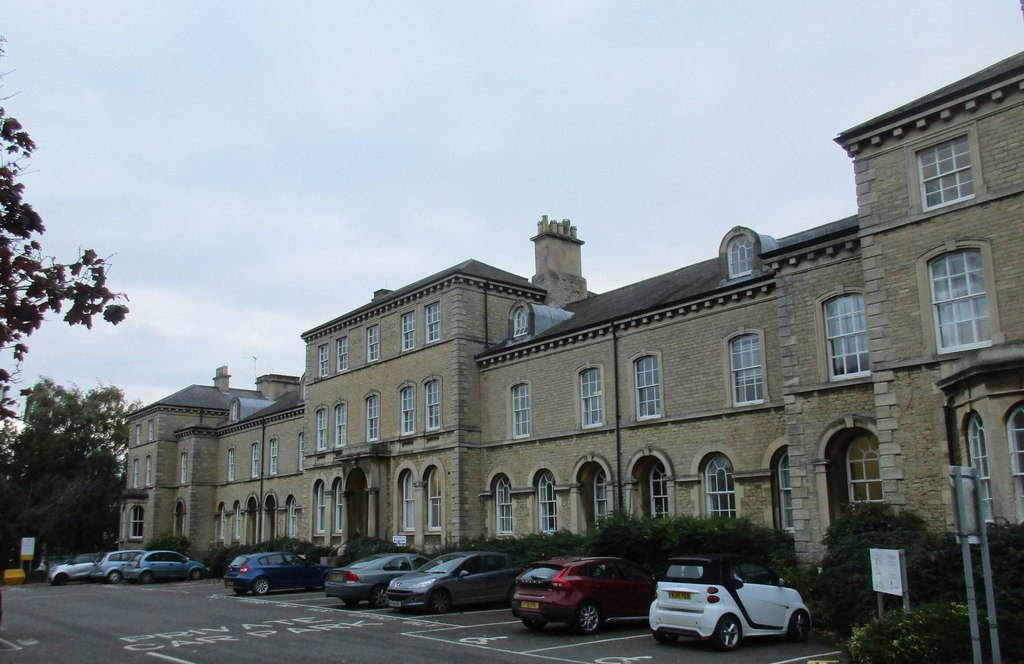
North Kesteven Council Offices, Kesteven Street

Since 2015, the town council has had its headquarters at the Town Hall in Quayside House, off Carre Street. (Note: The town council met in and maintained an office at Westgate House from 1973 until 1981, after which it shared rooms at the new civic centre at St George's School; in 2002, the offices moved to 3 Hill House, Carre Street, but the council continued to meet at St George's until 2006, after which it met at Carre's Grammar School until 2011, after which meetings were held at The Source in Southgate. In 2015, it very briefly met at Mill House, before moving both its offices and council chamber to Quayside House that year; it purchased the property in 2016.) The district council is based at the Council Offices on Kesteven Street, which had been occupied by the former Kesteven County Council (KCC) from 1925; a large extension took place in 1960. After KCC's abolition in 1974, the complex was transferred to North Kesteven District Council, serving as its offices and, after a major extension in 1991, becoming its sole office building and host to its council chamber.

=== National politics ===
Before 1832, Sleaford was in the Lincolnshire parliamentary constituency, which encompassed all of the county except for four boroughs. In the 1818 election, 49 of the roughly 2,000 people living in New and Old Sleaford and Quarrington qualified to vote. In 1832, the Reform Act widened the franchise and divided Lincolnshire. Sleaford was in the South Lincolnshire constituency that elected two members to Parliament. Following the 1867 reforms, the South Lincolnshire constituency's borders were redrawn, but Sleaford remained within it. The franchise was widened by the reforms so that roughly 15% (202) of males in Sleaford and Quarrington could vote in 1868. The constituency was abolished in 1885 and the Sleaford constituency formed. It merged with the Grantham seat in 1918. In 1997, Sleaford was reorganised into Sleaford and North Hykeham. The current constituency has been held by Conservatives since it was created; (Note: The previous members were Douglas Hogg (1997–2010) and Stephen Phillips (2010–16).) the incumbent is Caroline Johnson, who has held it since 2016 and was re-elected with 36% of the vote in 2024.

== Public services ==
=== Utilities and communications ===
The Sleaford Gas Light Company was formed in 1838. The following year gas lighting was provided and a gasworks was constructed in Eastgate. In 1866, the company was incorporated; it lit the town through to the company's nationalisation in 1948. Gas ceased to be made there in the 1960s.

Following cholera outbreaks in the 1850s and 1870s, the Sleaford Water Act 1879 set up the Sleaford Water Company to provide clean water; it built a reservoir at Quarrington Hill, mains piping, and pumping machinery and waterworks, all opened in 1880. In 1948, the urban district council took over the company; in 1962 its operation was handed to the Kesteven Water Board, which was absorbed by the Anglian Water Authority in 1973. Until the 1880s, Sleaford's raw sewage was conveyed through "an antiquated system of drains, open cesspits and inadequate sewers"; the town's effluent was discharged into the Slea, which was also the source of drinking water. The local board of health purchased land for a sewage farm on the eastern fringe of the parish in the early 1880s and converted Cogglesford Mill into a pump to convey wastewater to the farm. This system was in place from 1884. Initially let to tenants, the urban district council took over management of the farm in 1903. In 1954, a treatment plant was built on East Road; expanded in the 1970s, it was upgraded in 1994.

Kesteven County Council built an electricity generating station on Castle Causeway in 1901, which remained beyond nationalisation in 1948; by the 1970s it had been extended to include a transformer and converted to a substation. Following nationalisation, the East Midlands Electricity Board provided electricity until privatisation in 1990. A "virtually carbon neutral" straw-burning power-station opened in 2013; most electricity generated is fed into the National Grid though it provides free heat to Sleaford's public buildings.

Sleaford's post office was based at Lindum House (23 Northgate) from 1897 to 1933, when it moved to Southgate. As of 2024, Sleaford Post Office still operates in Southgate. There is also Woodside Post Office on Lincoln Road. The town's telephone exchange was also based at Lindum House from 1897 to 1967, when an automated exchange opened on Westgate. (Note: The Westgate exchange replaced a primitive methodist chapel built in 1907 (superseding an older one on Westgate of 1841, which survives) and closed in 1964 when the society merged with the methodists on Northgate and worshipped at the chapel there.) Sleaford Library has occupied its present building on the Market Place since 1987, having previously been based in the former fire station at Watergate since 1956. As of 2024, the library includes a local and family history section and microfiche machine.

=== Emergency services and healthcare ===
Policing is provided by the Lincolnshire Police, firefighting by the Lincolnshire Fire and Rescue Service, and ambulance services by the East Midlands Ambulance Service. The first police station was built at Kesteven Street in 1845 and reconstructed in 1912; the police moved into the former Sleaford Rural District Council offices at the Hoplands on Boston Road in 1998, (Note: The site at the Hoplands was acquired by Sleaford Rural District Council (RDC) by 1960 to be used for housing, but in 1962 they opted to build a new office there (replacing smaller premises on Northgate, which they had occupied since 1915); the RDC building was completed in 1964 and included its council chamber and offices. After its abolition in 1974, the RDC's successor, North Kesteven District Council, used the site for offices and full council meetings, but after it extended its other building at Lafford Terrace in 1991, the district council sold the Hoplands site to Lincolnshire County Council, who spent £2m converting it into the police station between 1996 and 1998 (this included adding a cell block and communications tower).) and this remains Sleaford Police Station as of 2024. The fire and ambulance services share accommodation on Eastgate which opened in 2018. Sleaford's first fire station was built in 1829 on Watergate and was completely rebuilt by the urban district council in 1900; the fire service moved to premises on Church Lane in 1953, which it occupied till 2018. The ambulance service had operated from Kesteven Street from 1960 until 2018.

The United Lincolnshire Hospitals NHS Trust provides services at four hospitals: Pilgrim Hospital in Boston, Grantham and District Hospital, Lincoln County Hospital and the County Hospital Louth. As of 2024, Sleaford has two GP surgeries: Sleaford Medical Group and Millview Medical Centre. The town also has three dental surgeries and four pharmacies. Lincolnshire Partnership NHS Trust runs Ash Villa at Greylees for the NHS Mental Health Service. There are also two care homes: Oakdene and Glenholme Holdingham Grange. Between 1902 and 1997, a mental institute, Rauceby Hospital, operated west of Quarrington, initially run by the county council and from 1948 the NHS; its patient enrolment peaked at 590 in 1958. The town had an NHS clinic at Laundon House, which opened as a maternity hospital in the 1930s, was taken over by the NHS in the 1940s and converted to a clinic in the post-war decades, before closing in 2016.

=== Justice ===
From the 14th century, justice was administered through the assizes (periodic courts which heard capital cases) or by the justices of the peace (later called magistrates), who tried more serious but non-capital crimes in the quarter sessions with a jury and more minor crimes in the petty sessions without a jury. The petty and quarter sessions came to be known as the magistrates' courts. Each of the three parts of Lincolnshire had its own quarter sessions; in Kesteven, the sessions were split between northern and southern divisions; those for the north met at Sleaford from at least the 17th century and the court was known as the Sleaford Bench. (Note: Covering the wapentakes of Flaxwell, Langoe, Aswardhurn, Loveden and Boothby Graffoe.) The magistrates met at a building on the market place, which was replaced in 1830 by Sessions House. The system was overhauled in 1971, with the quarter sessions and assizes replaced with the Crown Court, which has been held in Lincoln ever since; Sessions House continued to host the petty sessions until 2008, when cases were transferred to Grantham.

== Education ==
Sleaford has four state primary schools. William Alvey Church of England School, founded in 1729 following a bequest by William Alvey, became an academy in 2012 and in 2022 was rated "good" by the Office for Standards in Education, Children's Services and Skills (Ofsted); it caters for 650 pupils aged 4 to 11. Founded in 1867, St Botolph's Church of England School is voluntary controlled, has 406 pupils aged 5 to 11 on roll, and was rated "good" by Ofsted in 2023. Our Lady of Good Counsel Roman Catholic School was established in 1882 and converted to an academy in 2013; in 2023, it had 166 boys and girls aged 4 to 11 on roll and was rated "good" by Ofsted. Church Lane Primary School, formerly Sleaford Infants' School, opened in 1908; a community school with a nursery, it caters for 203 boys and girls aged 3 to 11 as of 2023; at its latest Ofsted inspection (in 2014), Church Lane Primary School was rated "outstanding".

The town has three secondary schools, each with sixth forms: the two grammar schools (Carre's Grammar School and Kesteven and Sleaford High School) are selective: pupils are required to pass the eleven plus exam. The other school, St George's Academy, is not selective. Carre's is a boys' school (with a coeducational sixth form) founded in 1604 with 806 pupils on roll as of 2024; it converted to an academy in 2011 and was judged to be "good" by Ofsted in 2023. It was managed by the Robert Carre Trust (RCT) until the RCT merged with the Community Inclusive Trust in 2025. Kesteven and Sleaford High School is a girls' school (with a coeducational sixth form) founded in 1902. It became an academy in 2011 and was judged to be "good" by Ofsted in 2017. It was taken over by the Robert Carre Trust in 2015, and since 2025 has also been managed by the RCT's successor, the Community Inclusive Trust As of 2024, it has 763 pupils on roll. St George's Academy is a mixed-sex comprehensive school. It traces its origins to 1908 when Sleaford Council School opened; it became a secondary modern school after the Second World War, a comprehensive in 1992, a technology college in 1994 and an academy in 2010. As of 2024, it operates a satellite school at Ruskington; and has 2,319 pupils across both sites. Ofsted judged it "good" in 2015. The coeducational Sleaford Joint Sixth Form consortium allows pupils from each school to choose subjects taught at all three schools.

As of 2024, Sleaford has one independent special school: Holton Sleaford Independent School, which opened in 2021. It caters for pupils with "social, emotional, and mental health difficulties". At its latest Ofsted inspection in 2022 it was rated "good".

== Places of worship and religious organisations ==
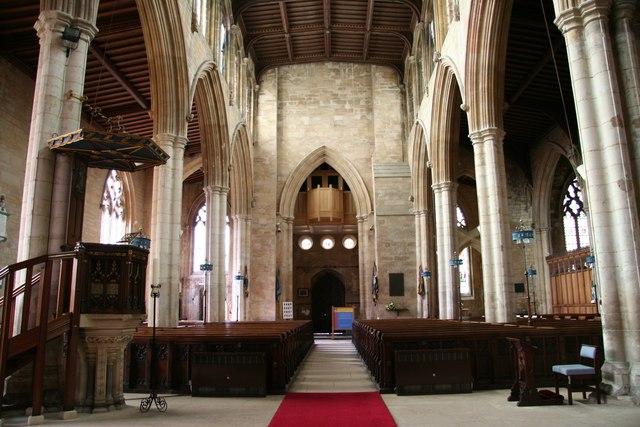
Constructed in the Decorated Gothic style, much of the nave of St Denys' Church dates to the 14th century.

=== Anglican ===
The Anglican ecclesiastical parish of Sleaford (formerly New Sleaford), includes the town of Sleaford and hamlet of Holdingham, but not Quarrington. It falls within the Lafford Deanery, the Lincoln Archdeaconry and the Diocese of Lincoln. (Note: The parishes of New and Old Sleaford were in the peculiar jurisdiction of the prebendary until 1846, when they became part of Aswardhurn and Lafford Rural Deanery. In 1866 they were placed in Aswardhurn and Lafford No. 2 Rural Deanery, from 1884 in the Lafford No. 2 Rural Deanery, the Lafford South Rural Deanery from 1910, and since 1968, the Lafford Rural Deanery.) The parish church, St Denys', fronts onto the market place; it might have been in existence by c. 1086. The vicarage was founded and endowed in 1274. As of 2024, services are held every Sunday and Wednesday. (Note: Holdingham had its own chapel in the medieval period; dedicated to St Mary, it was last in use around the 1550s; it subsequently disappeared and its former location is not known.)

In the Middle Ages, Old Sleaford had its own church, originally dedicated to All Saints and later to St Giles. It disappeared at the end of the medieval period. It was in the possession of Ramsey Abbey at the time of Domesday and later Haverholme Priory, and was eventually served by a vicar. At the Dissolution of the Monasteries (1536–41), the king took over collection of the tithes, later leasing them to Thomas Horseman and then selling them to Robert Carre. In the 17th century, the rectory of Quarrington and the vicarage of Old Sleaford were combined to form the ecclesiastical parish of Quarrington with Old Sleaford. As of 2024, the parish is served by St Botolph's Church in Quarrington village. It is in the deanery of Lafford and archdeaconry of Lincoln. In 1932 a church hall was built on Grantham Road and used as a community centre as of 2009.

The prebendary of New Sleaford or Lafford had a seat in the Lincoln Cathedral; it is not known when it was established, but it was confirmed by the Pope in 1146 and 1163, and was in the patronage of the bishop. The Prebendal Court of Sleaford had jurisdiction over New and Old Sleaford and Holdingham to grant administration and probate.

=== Other Christian denominations ===
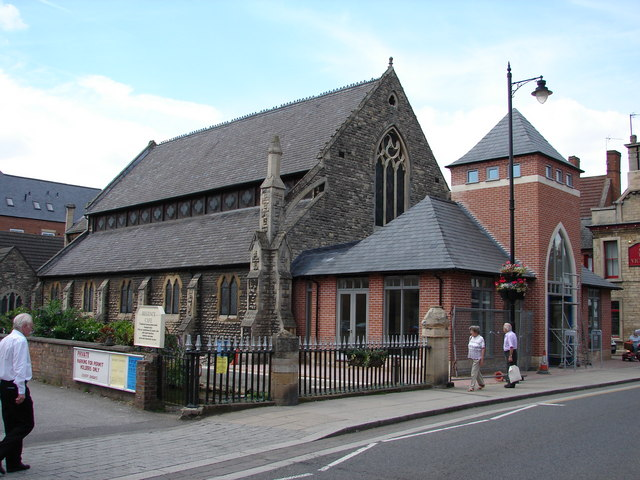
Riverside Church, Southgate

Meetings of Dissenters were taking place at Southgate by 1692, but ceased in 1732. Non-conformist meetings next took place on Hen Lane (later Jermyn Street) from c. 1776. The chapel was extended in 1819 and a school added in 1837. (Note: In the Compton Census (1676), New Sleaford had a Conformist (Anglican) population of 576 people, no "Papists" and 6 Non-conformists.) In the 19th century, it had a sizeable Non-conformist population and a large Anglican congregation; at the 1851 Census of Religious Worship, an estimated 2,000 people attended Non-conformist places of worship, while an estimated 600–700 people attended Anglican services in the parish. The Wesleyans met in Westgate in the early 19th century; by 1848, the congregation had set up in Northgate, an area known for its taverns and poor tenements.. The Congregationalists who met there moved to a new chapel on Southgate in 1867–1868 (extended in 2007); in 1972, it became Sleaford United Reformed Church, which merged with Sleaford Community Church to form Riverside Church in 2008. As of 2024, it hosts weekly Sunday worship. Wesleyan Methodists first met on Westgate in the late 18th century and built a chapel there in 1802. (Note: The local historian Simon Pawley says that they first met in the 1790s at the house of Thomas Fawcett there, while the county council has stated that they first met in 1796 at the Paper Mills on Westgate, and then hired a room in Park's Yard in c. 1799, before occupying a succession of houses until 1802.) They moved to a chapel on North Street in 1848, rebuilt in 1972. As of 2024, this houses Sleaford Methodist Church, in the Sleaford Methodist Circuit; it hosts services every Sunday. A Wesleyan Reform chapel opened in West Banks in 1864, but since 1896 has been occupied by the Salvation Army, who hold a weekly Sunday service there as of 2024. In the 19th and 20th centuries, there were also Primitive Methodist (Note: The Primitive Methodists began meeting in the town in 1838 in a house in Long Row, New Quarrington. They then occupied a house on Westgate, before having a purpose-built chapel on that road in 1841; in 1964 the congregation merged with the Methodists based at Northgate.) and Baptist chapels in the town. (Note: A Baptist chapel was built on Boston Road in 1808. It served the Strict Baptists until 1881, when most of the congregation moved to a new chapel on Eastgate, though a faction remained until 1915, after which the building was converted to a house. The chapel on Eastgate was known as the Temple and housed Particular Calvinist Baptists. It closed in the 1980s.)

By 1879 a Roman Catholic missionary was conducting services in the town. A Catholic school and chapel were built in 1882 on Jermyn Street and in 1889, Our Lady of Good Counsel Roman Catholic Church, opened beside it. As of 2023, the Catholic parish sits in the Fenland Deanery of the Diocese of Nottingham. As of 2024, Mass is celebrated on Sundays and throughout the week with a Vigil mass on Saturday.

A congregation of Jehovah's Witnesses was founded in Sleaford in 1955; they built a Kingdom Hall on Castle Causeway in 1972, which was rebuilt in 1999. As of 2024, the congregation meet on Wednesdays and Sundays. Sleaford New Life Church began meeting in the 1960s; in 2002, they purchased a site at Mareham Lane and built a new church there; as of 2024, the congregation meet there for worship on Sundays. The church also runs a food bank. Sleaford Spiritualist Church was founded in 1932 and opened its church building on Westgate in 1956. As of 2024, a divine service is held there on Sundays.

=== Muslim ===
The Sleaford Muslim Community Association met in St Deny's Church Hall during the early 2000s. A prayer hall, Sleaford Islamic Centre, opened in 2015. A mosque was completed on the Station Road site in 2020. Daily prayers are held there as of 2024.

== Culture ==
=== Arts, entertainment and heritage ===
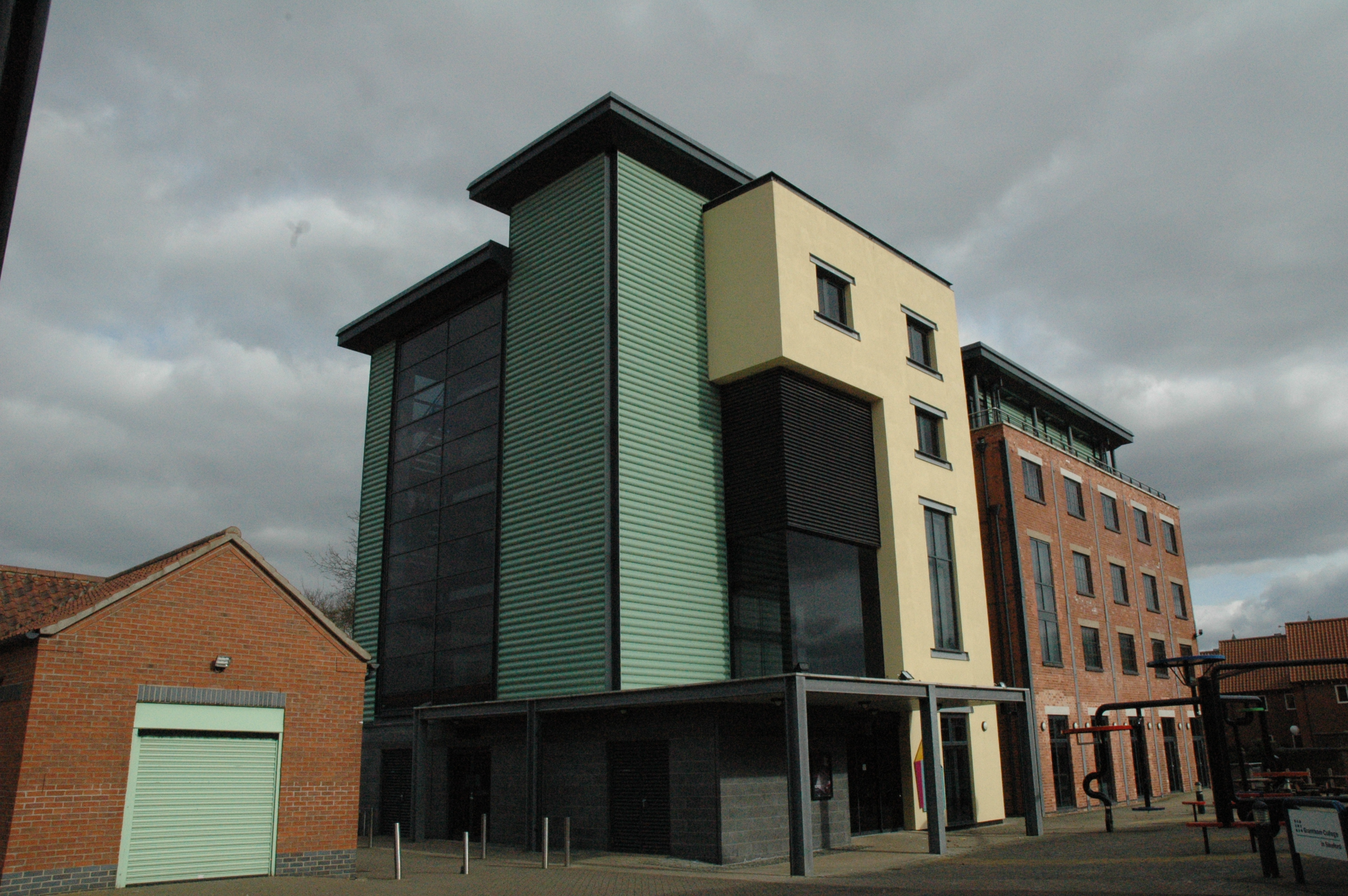
The Hub (formerly the National Centre for Craft & Design)

The Hub, an arts centre, opened in 2002 and houses exhibitions of applied and contemporary art. Opened in 2010, the Carre Gallery is operated by Sleaford Gallery Arts Trust. The Playhouse theatre on Westgate was constructed in 1825 for Joseph Smedley and sold in 1856 to be converted into a school and later a library and offices. Sleaford Little Theatre restored it and in 2000 it reopened as a theatre. The Sleaford Picturedrome opened in 1920; the cinema closed in 2000 and has since been occupied by nightclubs and bars. (Note: After closing in 2000, the building became a snooker hall and then a nightclub that closed in 2008 before reopening as another nightclub in 2015 which was still operating in 2021, though as of 2024 the building has been converted into a sports bar.)

Sleaford hosted an annual carnival in the 20th century; it was last held in 1995 before being revived in 2013; it ran for three years before the planned 2016 carnival was cancelled. The RiverLight Festival, offering activities, open days and exhibitions, has taken place annually since 2022. As of 2024, Sleaford Live Week is organised annually to showcase local musicians and artists.

Sleaford Museum Trust was formed in the 1970s to preserve historical artefacts from the town's history; it opened a museum on Southgate in 2015. Sleaford and District Civic Trust was founded in 1972 to "preserve the best features" of the town. Sleaford Rotary Club received its charter in 1956; it runs charity and community events. Founded in 1999, Sleaford and District Town Twinning Association has maintained links with Marquette-lez-Lille since 1999 and Fredersdorf-Vogelsdorf since 2009.

=== Sport and recreation ===
Sleaford Town F.C. played in the United Counties League Premier Division North for the 2024–25 season. Formed as Sleaford Amateurs F.C. in 1920, the club was renamed Sleaford Town in 1968. In 2007 it moved to its present grounds at Eslaforde Park. Sleaford Rugby FC was established in 1978 and opened its clubhouse in 1999. Sleaford Golf Club was founded in 1905. In 2014, the club had roughly 600 members. Sleaford Cricket Club has grounds at London Road; the earliest record of the club is in 1803; its pavilion opened in 1967. The town is also home to lawn bowling clubs, including Bristol Bowls Club (founded in 1934), (Note: Sleaford has a lawn bowls club, Bristol Bowls Club, with facilities on Boston Road. Its origins trace back to at least 1904, when croquet matches were being played at Boston Road. Croquet fell out of favour in the 1930s and the croquet club was disbanded and the Boston Road Bowls Club founded in its place in 1934. By the 1960s, it had its own pavilion and lawn at Boston Road. It was renamed Bristol Bowls Club in 1961 to avoid confusion with the Sleaford Road (Boston) Bowls Club.) Eslaforde Park BC, and Sleaford Town BC (at Mareham Lane). There is also Sleaford Indoor Bowling Club, established in 1991; (Note: Following a fundraising campaign and membership drive beginning in 1985, Sleaford Indoor Bowling Club purchased the lease on land adjacent to the town's leisure centre in 1987, and opened a purpose-built bowling centre in 1991, which was refurbished in 2004.) an all-discipline gymnastics club founded in 1996; Sleaford Striders, an athletics club founded in 1984; and Sleaford Town Runners, established in 2006.

Sleaford Leisure Centre originated as an outdoor lido in 1886; a children's pool was added in 1960 but closed in 1981, and the older pool was converted into the modern indoor leisure centre in 1984. In 2013 North Kesteven District Council rebuilt the centre and its gym. Owned and managed by Sleaford Town Council, Sleaford Recreation Ground on Boston Road (opened in 1897) spans 13.8 acres. (Note: Previously a plant nursery, by the 1890s the land was being let by its tenant Thomas Constable for public events and sports matches. The urban district council acquired his lease in 1897 to use the land as a recreation ground and bought the freehold from Lord Bristol in 1962 (also purchasing another field). In the 1950s and 1970s, the council added tennis courts.) Other smaller open spaces and playgrounds are managed by the town council. (Note: The council owns and manages Castlefield (6.2 acres), Woodside Play Area (5.5 acres), George Street Play Area (2.2 acres), Lincoln Road Play Area (1.2 acres), Meadowfield Play Area (0.75 acres) and Eastgate Green (0.75 acres); it manages but does not own the play areas at Peacock Court and Spire View.)

=== Local media ===
Local news and television programmes are provided by BBC Yorkshire and Lincolnshire and ITV Yorkshire. Local radio stations include BBC Radio Lincolnshire and Hits Radio Lincolnshire (formerly Lincs FM). The town's newspapers are the Sleaford Standard (founded in 1924), the Sleaford Advertiser (founded in 1980) and the Sleaford Target (founded in 1984). The Sleaford Gazette operated between 1854 and 1960 (when it was taken over by the Standard). The Sleaford Journal ran from at least 1884 until it was incorporated into the Gazette in 1929. (Note: Short-lived newspapers included the Sleaford Telegraph (1888–1889) and the Sleaford Guardian (1945–1946).)

== Historic buildings and landmarks ==
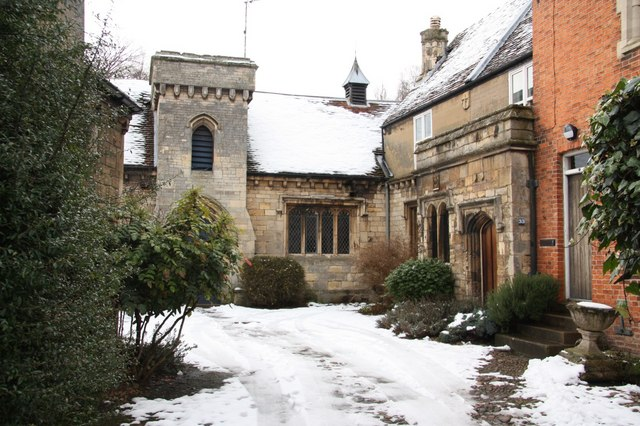
Manor House, Northgate

A few medieval buildings remain. St Denys' Church, noted for its tracery, dates to the 12th century; its stone broach spire is among the oldest in England. The half-timbered vicarage is 15th-century. Quarrington's St Botolph's Church includes 13th-century elements. The Bishops of Lincoln constructed the now-ruined Sleaford Castle and granted a market to the town. The town's historic core is the market place and the four roads which meet there: Northgate, Southgate, Eastgate and Westgate; many 18th- and 19th-century buildings are found in this area, including the "fine" baroque late-17th-century building at 2 Northgate, the Manor House inset with medieval masonry, and Sessions House. The Carre family founded the grammar school which was rebuilt in 1834, the hospital, rebuilt in 1830, and the almshouses, rebuilt 1857, while the Victorian builders Kirk and Parry constructed or added to numerous buildings, including Lafford Terrace and their own houses on Southgate and at Westholme.

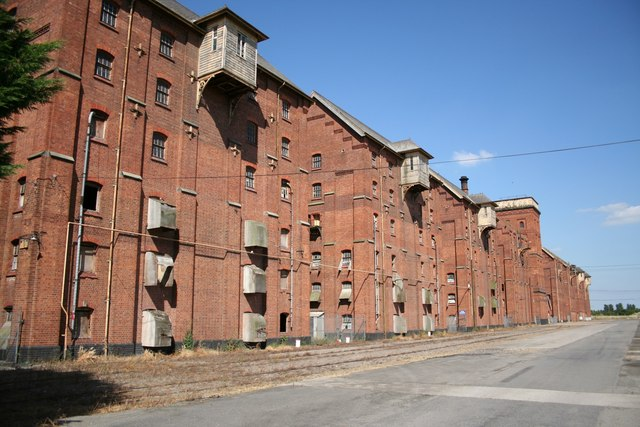
The derelict Bass Maltings

Cogglesford Mill is a testament to the historic economic importance of the Slea. During the Industrial Revolution, the Sleaford Navigation Company constructed offices along Carre Street (their reputed location is now grade-II-listed), while the Gothic gasworks on Eastgate lit the town from 1839. Henry Handley, a local MP, is commemorated by the Handley Memorial on Southgate, a Gothic monument in the style of an Eleanor Cross. During the 1850s, the railway station was built in a Gothic style. Sleaford's agricultural location and transport links encouraged seed trading and malting in the late 19th century; the seed merchant Charles Sharpe's listed house, The Pines, is on Boston Road. The Bass maltings, built off Mareham Lane between 1892 and 1905, has a frontage over 1,000 feet long.

== Sleafordians ==
The Handley family were well-connected with business; Benjamin Handley was a lawyer, prominent in the Navigation Company and partner in the local bank Peacock, Handley and Kirton. His son, Henry, was MP for South Lincolnshire; after his death, the residents erected a monument to him on Southgate. Robert Armstrong Yerburgh, the son of Rev. Richard Yerburgh, vicar of New Sleaford, was twice MP for Chester. The politicians Sir Thomas Meres and Sir Robert Pattinson attended the grammar school.

The religious controversialist Henry Pickworth was born in New Sleaford and challenged the opponent of Quakerism Francis Bugg to an open debate there. John Austin, a religious writer, was educated at the grammar school. William Scoffin was the town's Presbyterian minister and preached there for more than forty years, while Benjamin Fawcett, a Presbyterian minister, was born and educated at Sleaford.

In science, Richard Banister, the oculist, practised for 14 years in Sleaford. Henry Andrews, astronomer and astrologer, worked in Sleaford in his youth. The botanist David H. N. Spence was born in Sleaford; and the sociologist Sheila Allen attended Kesteven and Sleaford High School.

The royalist poet Thomas Shipman was educated at Carre's Grammar School, as was the novelist Henry Jackson. Joseph Smedley, the actor and comedian, built the theatre in 1824, before settling in the town in 1842. The children's author Morris Gleitzman, the actress and comedian Jennifer Saunders, the singer Lois Wilkinson of the Caravelles, Bernie Taupin (Elton John's lyricist), and Eric Thompson, who narrated The Magic Roundabout television series, were all born in Sleaford. The professional footballer Mark Wallington grew up in the town.

== Coat of arms ==
Coat of arms of Sleaford Town Council
Notes Sleaford Urban District Council was granted a coat of arms on 26 October 1950. Its successor Sleaford Town Council was granted the right to use the arms in 1975. Crest On a Wreath of the Colours an Eagle wings extended and head downwards and to the sinister proper holding in the beak an Ear of Wheat stalked and leaved Or. (not shown) Escutcheon Gules on a Chevron Or three Estoiles Sable on a Chief Argent as many Trefoils slipped Vert. Symbolism The shield combines elements from the arms of the Carre family and the Marquesses of Bristol; the eagle in the crest symbolises Sleaford's links with the Royal Air Force and the ear of wheat in its beak represents agriculture.

== Bibliography ==
- Aitchison, Frances; Gunn, Amelia (1981), "Education", in Ellis, Charles (ed.), Mid-Victorian Sleaford, 1851–1871, Lincolnshire History, vol. 4, Lincoln: Lincolnshire Library Service, ISBN 978-0-86111-102-2
- AR Urbanism (2022), Sleaford Masterplan – Town Centre Refresh: Baseline Assessment and Proposed Strategy (PDF), London: AR Urbanism for North Kesteven District Council, archived from the original (PDF) on 31 December 2024
- Beresford, M. W.; Finberg, H. P. R. (1973), English Medieval Boroughs: A Hand-List, Newton Abbot: David & Charles, ISBN 978-0-7153-5997-6
- Brand, Anthony; Pawley, Simon (2024), Celebrating Fifty (PDF), Sleaford: Sleaford Town Council, archived from the original (PDF) on 22 May 2024
- Broun, James L. (2022). The Private Housing Estate, the 'New Middle Classes' and the Making of Post-Industrial England, 1970–2020 (PhD). University of Sussex.
- Burnham, Barry C.; Wacher, John (1990), The Small Towns of Roman Britain, Berkeley and Los Angeles, CA: University of California Press, ISBN 978-0-520-07303-6
- Central Lincolnshire Joint Planning Unit (2010), Central Lincolnshire Core Strategy: Issues and Options 2010 (PDF), Sleaford: Central Lincolnshire Joint Strategic Planning Committee, archived from the original (PDF) on 18 January 2015
- Central Lincolnshire Joint Strategic Planning Committee (2013), Central Lincolnshire Local Plan: Core Strategy: Partial Draft Plan for Consultation: Area Policies for Lincoln, Gainsborough and Sleaford, Lincoln: Central Lincolnshire Joint Planning Unit, archived from the original on 21 May 2024.
- Census Office (1852), Census of Great Britain, 1851: Population Tables. I. Numbers of the Inhabitants, in the Years 1801, 1811, 1821, 1831, 1841, & 1851, vol. 2, London: Her Majesty's Stationery Office, OCLC 27208914
- Census Office (1862), Census of England and Wales, 1861: Population Tables, vol. 1, London: George Edward Eyre and William Spottiswoode.
- Census Office (1873), Census of England and Wales, 1871: General Report, vol. 4, London: George Edward Eyre and William Spottiswoode.
- Cole, R. E. G., ed. (1913), Speculum Diœceseos Lincolniensis: Sub Episcopis Gul: Wake et Edm: Gibson, A.D. 1705–1723: Part I: Archdeaconries of Lincoln and Stow, Publications of the Lincoln Record Society, vol. 4, Lincoln: W. K. Morton and Sons for the Lincoln Record Society, OCLC 25782936
- Creasey, J. (1825), Sketches, Illustrative of the History and Topography of New and Old Sleaford, Sleaford: J. Creasey, OCLC 12993053
- Ekwall, Eilert (1977) [1960], The Concise Oxford Dictionary of English Place-names (4th ed.), Oxford: Oxford University Press, ISBN 978-0-19-869103-7
- Diocese of Nottingham (2023), Nottingham Diocesan Yearbook 2023 (PDF), Nottingham: Diocese of Nottingham, archived from the original (PDF) on 13 June 2024
- Ekosgen; Turley Economics (2015), Central Lincolnshire Economic Needs Assessment: Final Report (PDF), Manchester: Turley, archived from the original (PDF) on 3 November 2021.
- Ellis, Charles W. R. (1954), Carre's Grammar School: 1604–1954, Sleaford: W. K. Morton & Sons, OCLC 40597553
- Ellis, Charles (1981a), "Background", in Ellis, Charles (ed.), Mid-Victorian Sleaford, 1851–1871, Lincolnshire History, vol. 4, Lincoln: Lincolnshire Library Service, pp. 1–4, ISBN 978-0-86111-102-2
- Ellis, Charles (1981b), "Buildings Going up, Areas Decaying", in Ellis, Charles (ed.), Mid-Victorian Sleaford, 1851–1871, Lincolnshire History, vol. 4, Lincoln: Lincolnshire Library Service, pp. 67–70, ISBN 978-0-86111-102-2
- Ellis, Charles (1981c), "Sleaford and National Politics", in Ellis, Charles (ed.), Mid-Victorian Sleaford, 1851–1871, Lincolnshire History, vol. 4, Lincoln: Lincolnshire Library Service, pp. 171–179, ISBN 978-0-86111-102-2
- Elsdon, Sheila M. (1997), Old Sleaford Revealed: A Lincolnshire Settlement in Iron Age, Roman, Saxon and Medieval Times: Excavations 1882–1995, Oxford: Oxbrow Books, ISBN 978-1-900188-32-6
- Foster, C. W., ed. (1930), Calendar of Wills and Administrations at Lincoln, vol. 4, London: British Record Society, OCLC 931242560
- Gillespies (2011), Sleaford Masterplan: Final Report (PDF), Leeds: Gillespies, archived from the original (PDF) on 6 July 2021
- Greenway, Diana E. (1977), "Prebendaries: Lafford", in Greenway, Diana E. (ed.), Fasti Ecclesiae Anglicanae 1066–1300, vol. 3, London: Institute of Historical Research, pp. 73–74, ISBN 978-0-901179-43-2
- Hodgett, Gerald A. J. (1975), Tudor Lincolnshire, History of Lincolnshire, vol. 6, Lincoln: History of Lincolnshire Committee for the Society for Lincolnshire History and Archaeology, ISBN 978-0-902668-05-8
- Hosford, W. H. (1968). "The Manor of Sleaford in the Thirteenth Century". Nottingham Medieval Studies. 12: 21–39. doi:10.1484/J.NMS.3.37.
- Ingman, Terence (2011), The English Legal Process, Oxford: Oxford University Press, ISBN 978-0-19-958194-8
- Kelly's Directories (1889), Kelly's Directory of Lincolnshire, London: Kelly & Co., OCLC 1252098077
- Kerching Retail (2015), Sleaford Town Centre Vision (PDF), Lutterworth: Kerching Retail for North Kesteven District Council, archived from the original (PDF) on 10 June 2024
- Kesteven and Sleaford High School (2023), Kesteven and Sleaford High School: Part of the Robert Carre Trust: Admissions Policy, 2025–2026, Sleaford: Kesteven and Sleaford High School, archived from the original on 9 May 2024
- Lincolnshire Archives (n.d.), Lincolnshire Newspapers Bibliography (PDF), Lincoln: Lincolnshire Archives, archived from the original (PDF) on 4 March 2016
- Lincolnshire County Council (2019). Indices of Multiple Deprivation 2019 (PDF). Lincoln: Lincolnshire County Council. Archived from the original (PDF) on 29 June 2020.
- Lincolnshire County Council (2022), Lincolnshire Extensive Urban Survey: Sleaford – 2022 (PDF), Lincoln: Lincolnshire County Council, archived from the original (PDF) on 21 November 2023
- London North Eastern Railway (2024), Train Times: Sunday 15 December 2024 – Saturday 17 May 2025 (PDF), York: London North Eastern Railway, archived from the original (PDF) on 2 January 2025
- Ludlam, A. J. (1988), The RAF Cranwell Railway, Locomotive Papers, vol. 169, Oxford: Oakwood Press, ISBN 978-0-85361-379-4
- Mahany, Christine; Roffe, David (1979), Sleaford, Stamford: South Lincolnshire Archaeological Unit, ISBN 978-0-906295-02-1
- May, Jeffrey (1994). "Coinage and the Settlements of the Corieltauvi in the East Midlands and England" (PDF). British Numismatic Journal. 64. British Numismatic Society: 1–21. Archived from the original (PDF) on 10 November 2023.
- Met Office (2016), Eastern England: Climate (PDF), London: Met Office, archived from the original (PDF) on 4 June 2024
- National Farmers Union (2008), Why Farming Matters in the Fens, London: National Farmers Union, archived from the original on 18 January 2015
- North Kesteven District Council (2011a), Sleaford Masterplan: Appendix 4: Market Issues Report, GOAD Report and Employment Trends (PDF), Sleaford: North Kesteven District Council, archived from the original (PDF) on 5 December 2014
- North Kesteven District Council (2011b), Sleaford Masterplan: Executive Summary, Sleaford: North Kesteven District Council, archived from the original on 18 January 2015
- North Kesteven District Council (2011c), Sleaford Masterplan Scoping study: Final Report, Sleaford: North Kesteven District Council, archived from the original on 5 December 2014
- North Kesteven District Council (2011d), Sleaford Masterplan: Final Report (PDF), Sleaford: North Kesteven District Council, archived from the original (PDF) on 3 June 2024
- North Kesteven District Council (2024), North Kesteven District Profile February 2024 (PDF), Sleaford: North Kesteven District Council, archived from the original (PDF) on 25 May 2024.
- Office of Population Censuses and Surveys (1984), Census 1981: Ward & Civil Parish Monitor, vol. 27, London: Office of Population Censuses and Surveys, OCLC 11357965
- Office of Population Censuses and Surveys (1994), 1991 Census: Lincolnshire, Ward & Civil Parish Monitors, vol. 27, London: Office of Population Censuses and Surveys, OCLC 863355846
- Ofsted (2014), Church Lane Primary School, Manchester: Ofsted, archived from the original on 15 June 2024
- Ofsted (2022a), Inspection of Holton Sleaford Independent School, Manchester: Ofsted, archived from the original on 13 December 2024
- Ofsted (2022b), Inspection of William Alvey School, Manchester: Ofsted, archived from the original on 13 December 2024
- Ofsted (2023a), Inspection of Our Lady of Good Counsel Catholic Primary School, A Voluntary Academy, Manchester: Ofsted, archived from the original on 15 June 2024
- Ofsted (2023b), Inspection of a Good School: St Botolph's C of E Primary School, Manchester: Ofsted, archived from the original on 13 December 2024
- Olney, R. J. (1973), Lincolnshire Politics: 1832–1885, Oxford Historical Monographs, Oxford: Oxford University Press, ISBN 978-0-19-821848-7
- Olney, R. J. (1979), Rural Society and County Government in Nineteenth Century Lincolnshire, History of Lincolnshire, vol. 10, Lincoln: History of Lincolnshire Committee of the Society for Lincolnshire History and Archaeology, ISBN 978-0-902668-09-6
- Page, C. J. (1974), Sleaford: An Industrial History (2nd ed.), Lincoln: Society for Lincolnshire History and Archaeology, OCLC 2221528
- Pawley, Simon (1992). "Democracy and Proper Drains: Public Health and Landed Influence in Late-Nineteenth-Century Sleaford" (PDF). Lincolnshire Past and Present. 7. Society for Lincolnshire History and Archaeology: 8–10.
- Pawley, Simon (1996), The Book of Sleaford, Town Books, Finmere: Baron Birch for Quotes Ltd., ISBN 978-0-86023-559-0.
- Pawley, Simon; Peach, Alison (1996), "Kirk and Parry" (PDF), Lincolnshire Past and Present, vol. 24, Society for Lincolnshire History and Archaeology, pp. 3–4, archived from the original (PDF) on 15 July 2024
- Pawley, Simon; Turland, Michael (2021), Carre's Almshouses, Sleaford, Sleaford: Quasar Publications
- Pevsner, Nikolaus; Harris, John; Antram, Nicholas (2002) [1989], Lincolnshire, The Buildings of England, New Haven and London: Yale University Press, ISBN 978-0-300-09620-0
- Peyton, S. A., ed. (1931), Minutes of Proceedings in Quarter Sessions Held for the Parts of Kesteven in the County of Lincoln, 1674-1695: Volume I, Publications of the Lincoln Record Society, vol. 25, Lincoln: J. W. Rudduck and Sons for the Lincoln Record Society, OCLC 504418392
- Quarrington and Old Sleaford Parochial Church Council (March 2009), Benefice Profile and Statement of Need: Quarrington, Cranwell and Silk Willoughby in the Deanery of Lafford, Diocese of Lincoln, Lincoln: Diocese of Lincoln, archived from the original (PDF) on 23 February 2012
- Ranger, William (1850), Report to the General Board of Health on a Preliminary Inquiry into the Sewerage, Drainage, and Supply of Water, and the Sanitary Condition of the Inhabitants of the Parish of New Sleaford, London: Her Majesty's Stationery Office, OCLC 752695210
- Robinson, David N. (2001), "Natural Regions", in Bennett, Stewart; Bennett, Nicholas (eds.), An Historical Atlas of Lincolnshire (2nd ed.), Chichester: Phillimore and Co., pp. 8–9, ISBN 978-1-86077-166-8
- Shaw, Robert (1981), "Public Services", in Ellis, Charles (ed.), Mid-Victorian Sleaford, 1851–1871, Lincolnshire History, vol. 4, Lincoln: Lincolnshire Library Service, pp. 79–96, ISBN 978-0-86111-102-2
- Sleaford and District Civic Trust (December 2021), Civic Matters: The Newsletter of the Sleaford and District Civic Trust (PDF), Sleaford: Sleaford and District Civic Trust, archived from the original (PDF) on 16 August 2024
- Squires, Stewart E. (1988), The Lost Railways of Lincolnshire, Ware: Castlemead Publications, ISBN 978-0-948555-14-5
- St George's Academy (2024), St George's Academy: Admissions Policy, 2024–2025 (PDF), Sleaford: St George's Academy, archived from the original (PDF) on 22 September 2024
- Stroud, William; Stroud, Margaret (1981), "A Comparison of the 1851 and 1871 Census Returns for the Area Formerly Known as 'The Tofts'", in Ellis, Charles (ed.), Mid-Victorian Sleaford, 1851–1871, Lincolnshire History, vol. 4, Lincoln: Lincolnshire Library Service, pp. 51–66, ISBN 978-0-86111-102-2
- Taylor, Cyril (2009), A Good School for Every Child: How to Improve Our Schools, London: Taylor and Francis, ISBN 978-1-134-01599-3
- Thornton, Peter T. (1998), William Alvey's School, Sleaford, 1729–1998, Sleaford: William Alvey School, archived from the original on 31 January 2023
- Trollope, Edward (1872), Sleaford, and the Wapentakes of Flaxwell and Aswardhurn, London: W. Kent & Co., OCLC 228661584
- Varley, Joan (1974), The Parts of Kesteven: Studies in Law and Local Government, Sleaford: Kesteven County Council, OCLC 2425730
- Waterston, C. D.; Macmillan Shearer, A (2006), Biographical Index of Former Fellows of the Royal Society of Edinburgh, 1783–2002: Part II (PDF), Edinburgh: The Royal Society of Edinburgh, ISBN 978-0-902198-84-5, archived from the original (PDF) on 31 December 2024
- White, William (1856), History, Gazetteer, and Directory of Lincolnshire (2nd ed.), Sheffield: R. Leader, OCLC 1063361708
- Whiteman, Anne; Clapinson, Mary, eds. (1986), The Compton Census of 1676: A Critical Edition, Records of Social and Economic History (New Series), vol. 10, Oxford University Press for the British Academy, ISBN 978-0-19-726041-8
- Worsencroft, Ken (1978), Bygone Sleaford, Grantham: Bygone Grantham, OCLC 16425226
- Youngs, Frederic A. (1991), Guide to the Local Administrative Units of England, vol. 2, London: Royal Historical Society, ISBN 978-0-86193-127-9.
