= Sleaford Castle =

Medieval castle in Lincolnshire, England

- Sleaford, Lincolnshire, England
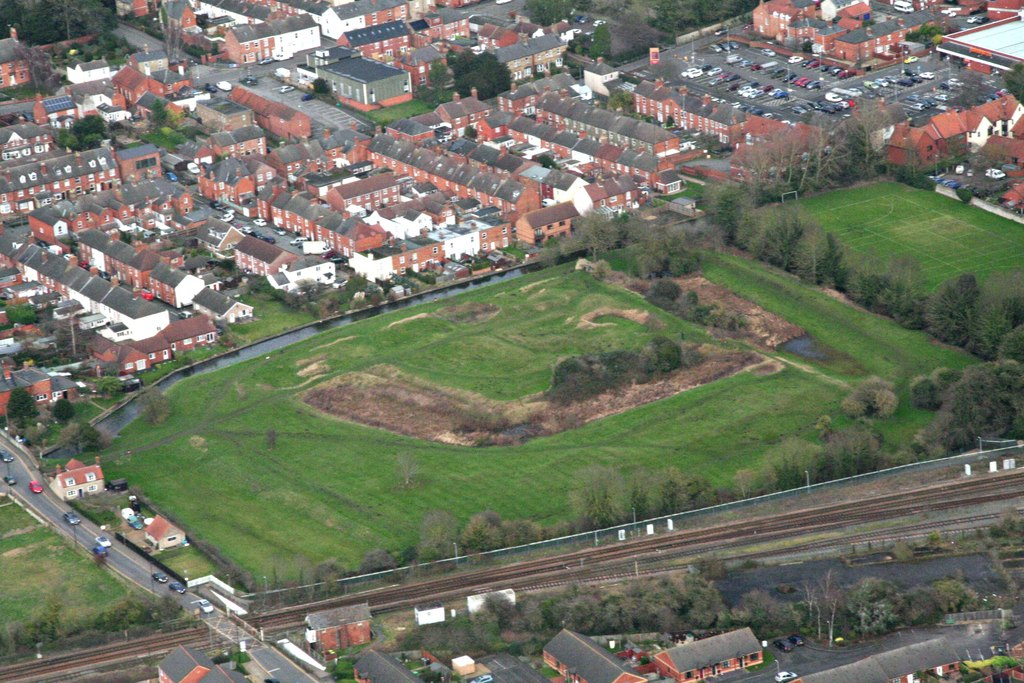
- Aerial view of the castle (2020)

Location
- Shown within Lincolnshire
- Location within Lincolnshire
- Coordinates: 52°59′48″N 0°24′55″W
- Grid reference: grid reference TF064455

Site history
- Materials: Stone

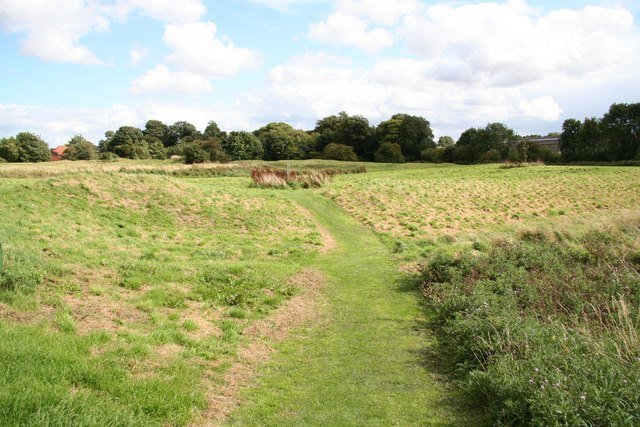
Remaining earthworks of Sleaford Castle

Sleaford Castle is a medieval castle in Sleaford, Lincolnshire, England. Built by the Bishop of Lincoln in the early 1120s, it was habitable as late as 1555 but fell into disrepair during the latter half of the 16th century. Two English monarchs are known to have stayed at the castle, King John and Henry VIII.

== Medieval era ==
The castle was built between 1123 and 1139 by Alexander de Blois, Bishop of Lincoln from 1123 to 1147. Alexander built a quadrilateral castle, akin to his construction at Newark Castle, with square towers and massive keep. He sited it on flat fen rather than on high ground, perhaps even replacing an earlier moated manor house on the site.

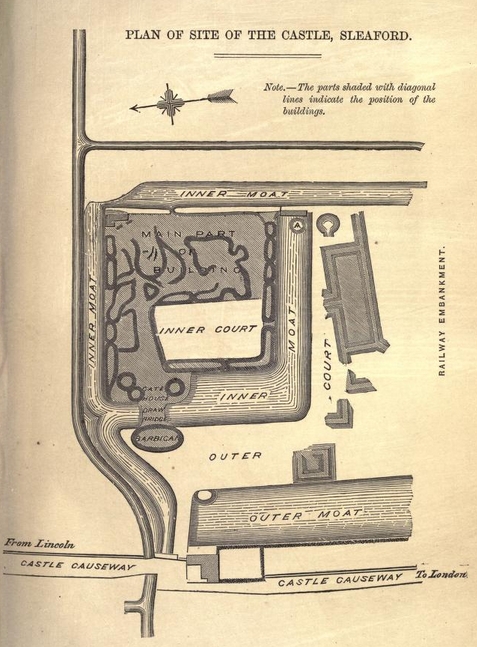
1872 plan of the castle

The building fulfilled its manor house function for most of its life, never withstanding an armed attack or siege but becoming one of the chief episcopal strongholds and an agricultural focus for the Bishop’s estates in Sleaford and elsewhere. An outline of a 40 by 15 metre tithe barn (said to be the largest in England, and with a cattle shed and hay loft attached) can still be seen in the southern half of the castle.

A dam was placed across the river Slea at the end of Westgate, with a two-wheeled watermill behind it, producing large quantities of agricultural products for the local people.

The nearest the castle came to a siege were on two occasions when the bishop was forced to hand over his keys to King Stephen during the Anarchy (by Alexander himself, to buy his release after Stephen's successful siege of Newark Castle) and to Edward II in the 1320s when his loyalties were doubted.

King John spent a night in the castle in October 1216 just after his disastrous crossing of the Wash and just before his death, and in 1430 Bishop Richard Fleming died in the castle.

== Early modern period ==
Henry VIII stayed at Sleaford twice (once in 1541 with his queen Catherine Howard) and held a State Council at the Castle. The castle passed into the hands of the Duke of Somerset in 1544, from whom it was confiscated by the crown in 1546. On both occasions, and in 1555, it was still said to be defensible and habitable. John Leland described it at this time as well maintained with a gatehouse, which housed two portcullises, and a high central tower, "but not sette upon a hille of raised yerth".

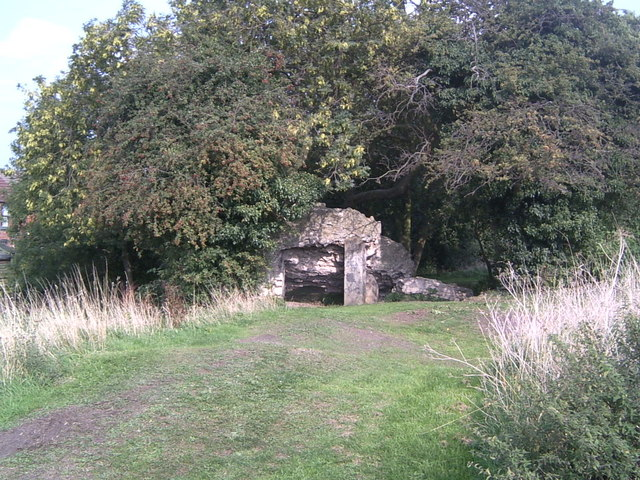
The scrap of masonry that remains

The castle began to fall into disrepair during the second half of the 16th century with the timber and lead roof being removed to be reused in buildings in the town, some of which survives to the present day. The process of decline continued under the ownership of the Carre family. In 1604 it was described as ‘the late fair castle’, suggesting it had been largely or even fully dismantled before 1600. An early 18th-century engraving of the castle shows a ruin with a considerable amount of stonework still visible.

== Present ==
The visible remains are now only a moat, a scrap of masonry (one small, toppled portion of a wall in the north-east corner of the inner bailey) and associated earthworks. It is now a scheduled monument and a Grade II listed building protected by law. It is also cultivated for wildlife.

Sleaford Castle was excavated during the 1860s, and was not excavated again until the Sleaford Castle Heritage Group excavated the castle grounds between 19-21 July 2023. The castle was excavated to determine its layout, and the finds included a floor tile fragment which featured a cat paw print on it, and also a Jetton of Hans Krauwinkel II from Nuremberg, dated to 1586-1635.

== See also ==
- Castles in Great Britain and Ireland
- List of castles in England
