= The National Centre for Craft & Design =

Gallery and arts venue in England

Hub
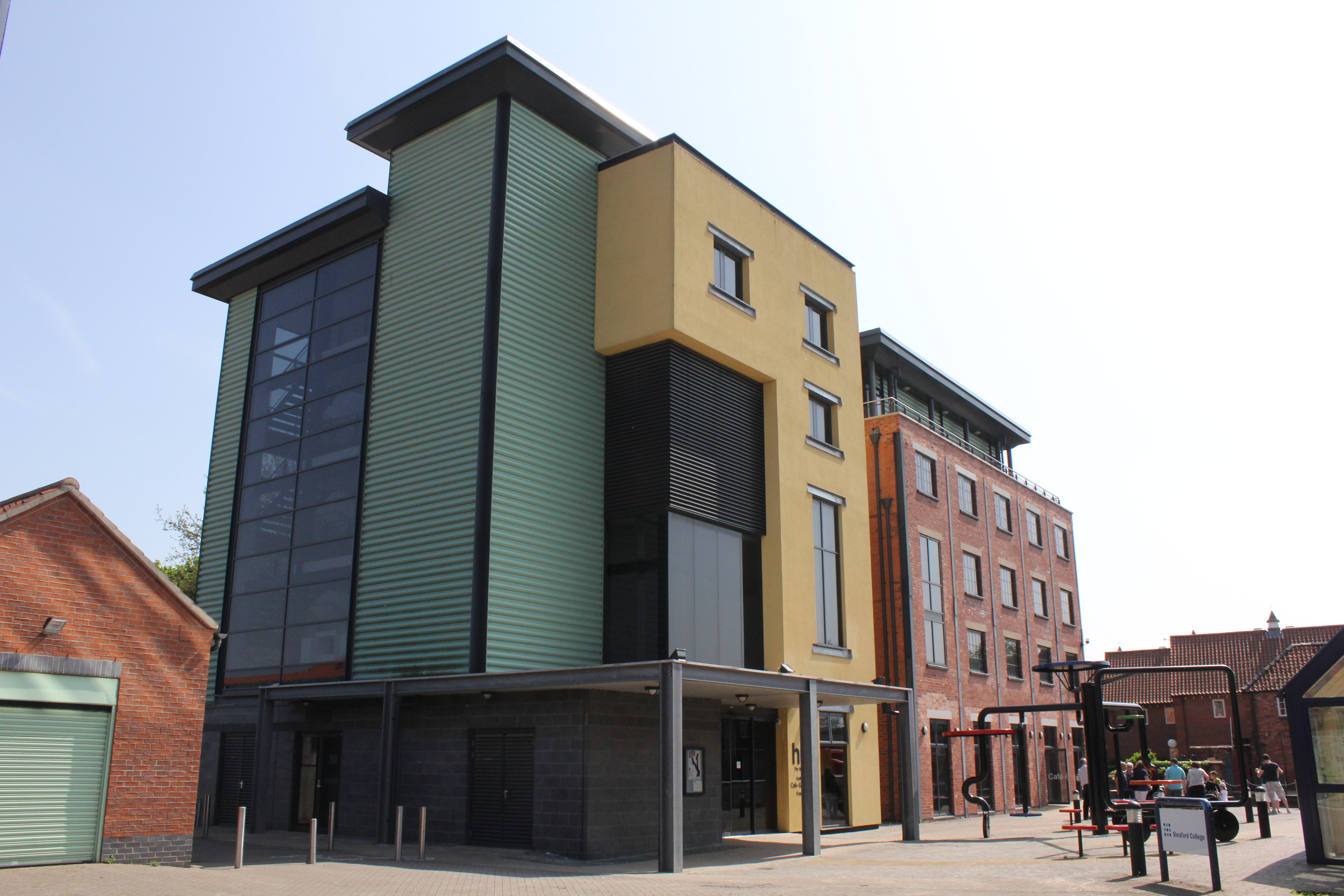
- Former name: The National Centre for Craft & Design
- Established: October 2003
- Location: Navigation Wharf, Carre Street, Sleaford, Lincolnshire, England, NG34 7TW
- Coordinates: 52.998679°N 0.407356°W
- Type: Gallery and arts venue
- Visitors: 90,000 (2011–12)
- Website: hub-sleaford.org.uk

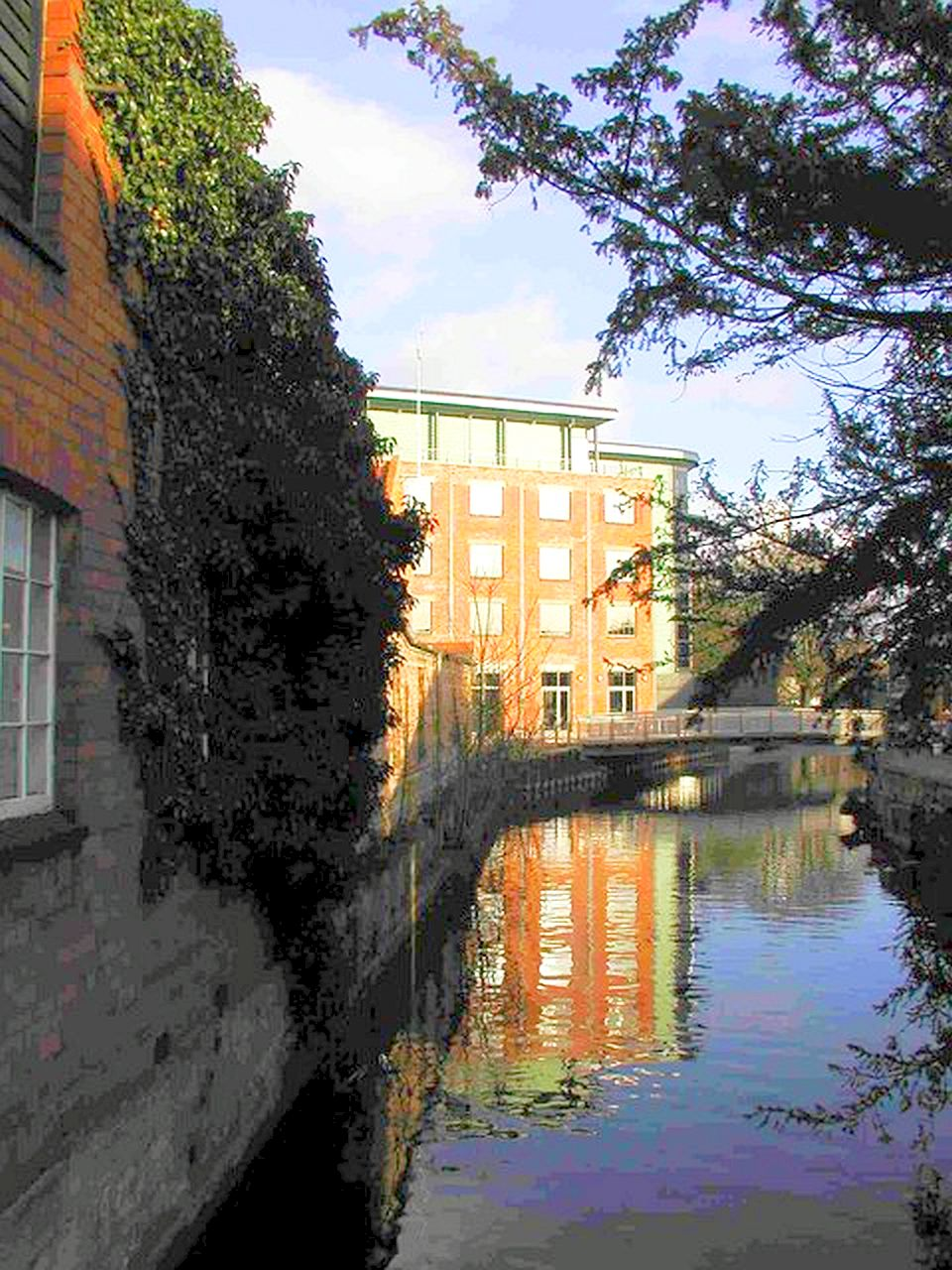
River Slea and the Hub

The Hub (sometimes The National Centre for Craft & Design) is an arts centre in Sleaford, Lincolnshire, which holds England's largest exhibition space for craft and design. It comprises a shop, cafebar, galleries, dance studio, and design workshops. The centre provides space for contemporary artists and makers, workshops, talks, classes, competitions and performance. It has creative links to local schools, and is a focus for the Design-Nation creatives network.

The NCCD began as 'The Hub' in 2003, in a converted Hubbard and Phillips company seed warehouse. In 2011 it changed to The National Centre for Craft & Design, funded by North Kesteven District Council and Arts Council England.

Before the NCCD re-brand, the building spent nine years as 'The Hub', after transferring from The Pearoom in Heckington which was turned into a heritage, craft and tourism centre for the village in the 1970s. Until a move to Sleaford in 2003, the current home was a seed warehouse from 1939 to 1972 and a storage area thereafter. The Hub is today an Arts Council England National Portfolio Organisation, owned and supported by North Kesteven District Council and operated by Lincs Inspire Limited, a Lincolnshire-based charity. A £1.2 million refurbishment in May 2021 followed closure because of the COVID-19 pandemic.

The Hub is part of Lincolnshire One Venues (LOV), aided by Lincolnshire Arts Trust to promote, and achieve funding for, ten arts centres within Lincolnshire. and is an Arts Council England National Portfolio Organisation, owned and supported by North Kesteven District Council and operated by Lincs Inspire Limited.

== Events ==
In 2011 the NCCD held an international competition for architects and artists to design beach huts for the Lincolnshire coast; entries came from North America, Europe and Asia in the form of scale models, the winning design being built full size.

In January 2012 the Centre became a venue for an international touring exhibition, The Museum of Broken Relationships, with Croatian exhibits of personal relationship mementos.

The NCCD co-curated, in collaboration with the Crafts Council and mac (Birmingham), the tri-annual Made in the Middle exhibition of contemporary design, held at the mac centre from February to April 2012. The Arts Council funded Design Factory announced that Made in the Middle would visit the NCCD from April to July 2012.
