= Comparison goods =

In retail economics and geography, comparison goods are products which are usually higher value and purchased infrequently, such as vehicles, household goods or clothing. Consumers tend to compare products before purchasing them to maximise value and quality. They are contrasted with consumer goods or convenience goods such as food, which are low-cost and purchased more frequently.

Shops offering comparison goods are often clustered in central business districts or in out-of-town retail centres, where retailers can compete over their offers.
