= Leisure Connection =

- Company type: Limited
- Genre: Fitness, Leisure
- Founded: 1998
- Founder: Mark McCormack
- Headquarters: England, Wyboston, Bedfordshire
- Parent: Danoptra Gaming Group
- Website: www.leisureconnection.co.uk

Leisure Connection Ltd is a fitness and leisure provider and manager of facilities on behalf of local government, national sporting bodies and businesses in UK.

== Background ==
Leisure Connection was formed from the merger of Relaxion and Circa leisure companies and is now part of the multinational Danoptra Group. In 2008, the Cognetas investment company, formerly Electra Partners Europe, sold their interest in Danoptra to Credit Suisse.

In recent years Leisure Connection has faced increasing competition for local authority contracts, not just from other companies but also from not-for-profit leisure trusts. It has sought to replace the dwindling margins of traditional contracts with private finance initiatives and more recently, running facilities owned by other companies including hotels.

Leisure Connection's reputation has not been helped by frequent changes of Chief Executive, reports of poor standards, contracts terminated by dissatisfied councils, and involvement in the Clissold Leisure Centre, a new built facility that opened in February 2002 and closed in November 2003. In 2006, while Clissold was still closed, Hackney Council and Leisure Connection agreed to end their contract.

Since 2008, the Leisure Connection brand has been replaced to a large extent by Harpers Fitness. Other brands that belong to Leisure Connection include Camp Energy, Aqua Action Swim School, Learning Hub, Venue Connect, Planet Action and Party Animals.

== Key facts and figures ==
- Over 60 centres
- Managing the centre of excellence for disability sport at Stoke Mandeville Stadium
- 28 centres with squash courts
- 32 with badminton courts
- 91 swimming pools ranging from 50 metre pools to teaching pools, baby splash pools and leisure pools
- 22 centres with indoor or outdoor tennis courts
- 2 centres with golf courses
- 11 centres with football pitches
- 50,000 Harpers gym members
- Over 40,000 children learning to swim each week
- 25 million visitors each year
- 4,000 employees
