= River Slea =

River in Lincolnshire, England

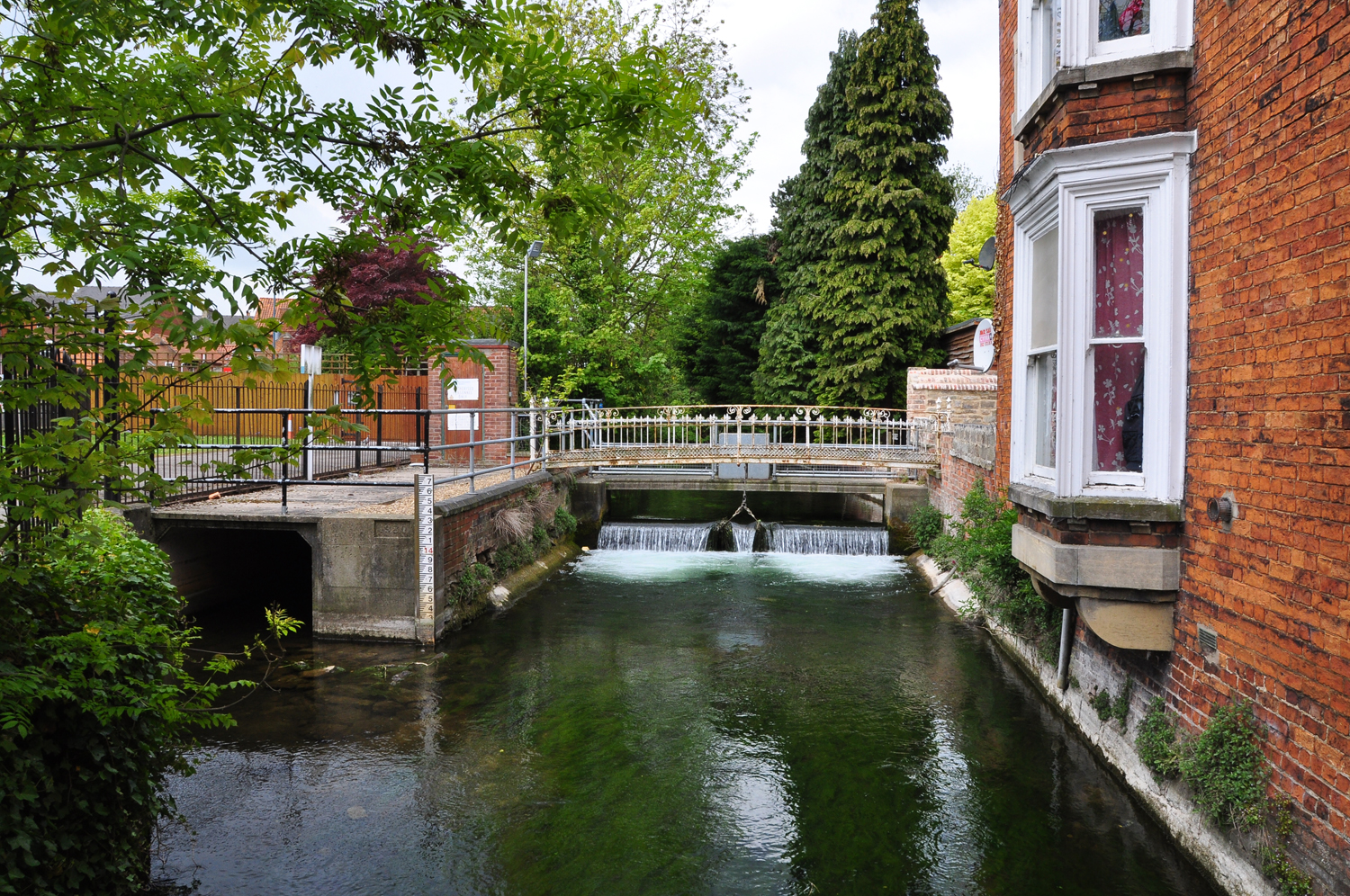
- Slea in Sleaford

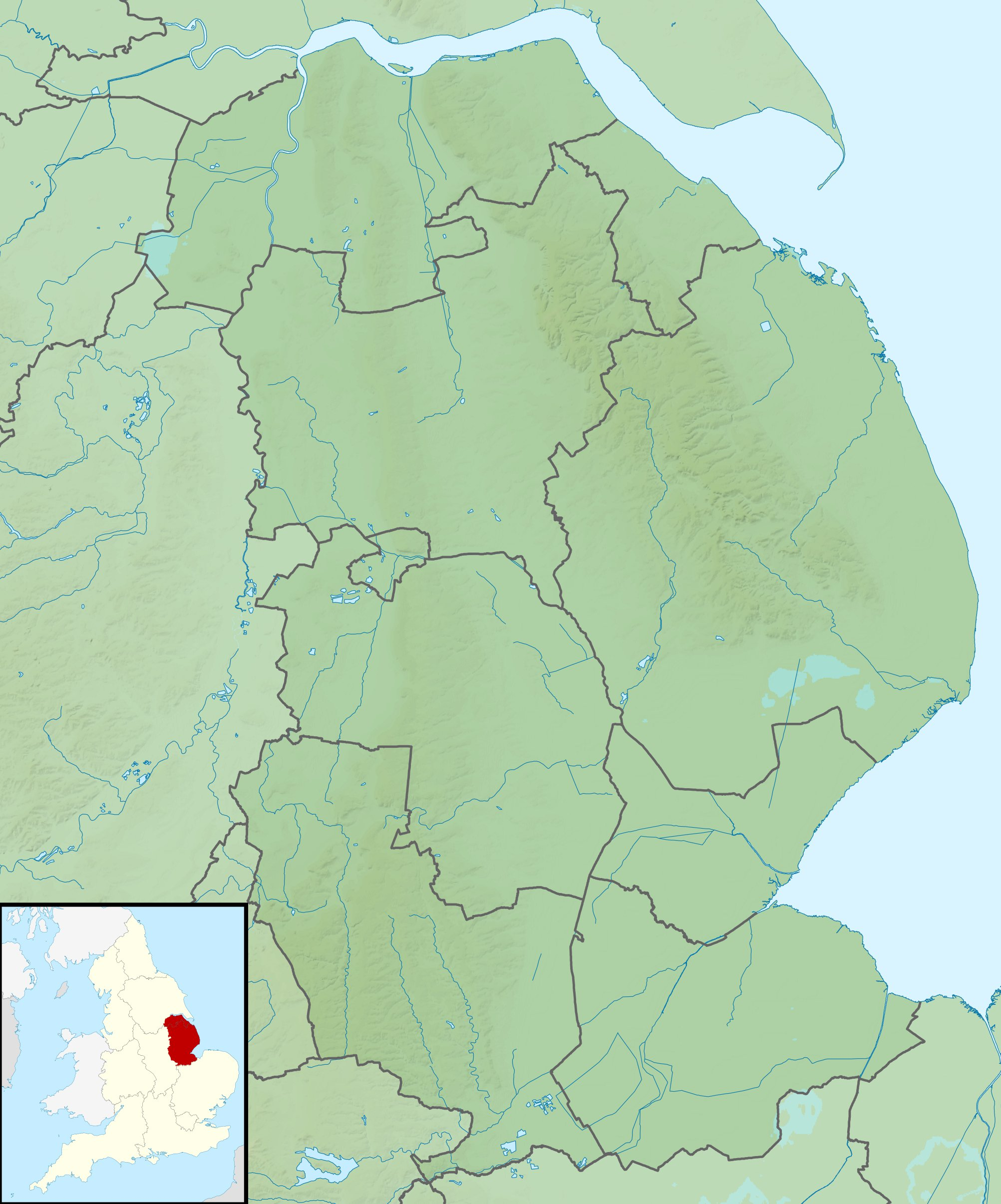
- Location of the mouth within Lincolnshire

Location
- Country: England
- County: Lincolnshire

Physical characteristics
- Source
  - location: West Willoughby
- Mouth
  - location: River Witham at Chapel Hill
  - coordinates: 53.069747°N 0.196723°W
- Length: 36.4 km (22.6 mi)
- Discharge
  - location: Leasingham Mill
  - average: 0.55 m^{3}/s (19 cu ft/s)

The River Slea is a 36.4-kilometre-long (22.6 mi) tributary of the River Witham, in Lincolnshire, England. In 1872 the river was described as "a never-ending source of pure water", and was a trout river renowned throughout the East coast of England. But in the late 1960s, the Anglian Water Authority took control of the river, and thereafter it became rapidly degraded, due mostly to over-abstraction of water for use in farming.

== Course ==
The Slea rises near West Willoughby, two miles south-west of Ancaster, at an altitude of 70 metres. The river descends 30 metres in the first 3 km of its course through Ancaster before flowing past a Site of Special Scientific Interest (alongside Sleaford Golf Club) into Sleaford.

Through Sleaford it flows above ground in two separate courses, and then curves around the foot of The Hub where a new riverside sculpture walk follows it. Leaving Sleaford, it passes Haverholme and runs down through South Kyme where it is known as the Kyme Eau to join the River Witham at Chapel Hill.

== Slea Navigation ==
The River Slea was made navigable from the Witham up to Sleaford in 1794, although these navigations were closed in 1878, having been made uneconomic by the arrival of the railway in 1857. There is now an active Sleaford Navigation Trust that aims to reopen to navigations again as far as Sleaford.

== See also ==
- Cogglesford Mill a working watermill on the Slea
- List of rivers of England
