= Charles Kirk =

Charles or Charlie Kirk may refer to:

- Charles Kirk (architect, born 1791) (1791–1847), English architect
- Charles Kirk (architect, born 1825) (1825–1902), English architect and son of the former, who founded Kirk and Parry
- Charlie Kirk (1993–2025), American Republican political activist and founder of Turning Point USA
- Charlie Kirk (footballer) (born 1997), English footballer
