= Spalding Sessions House =

Municipal building in Spalding, England

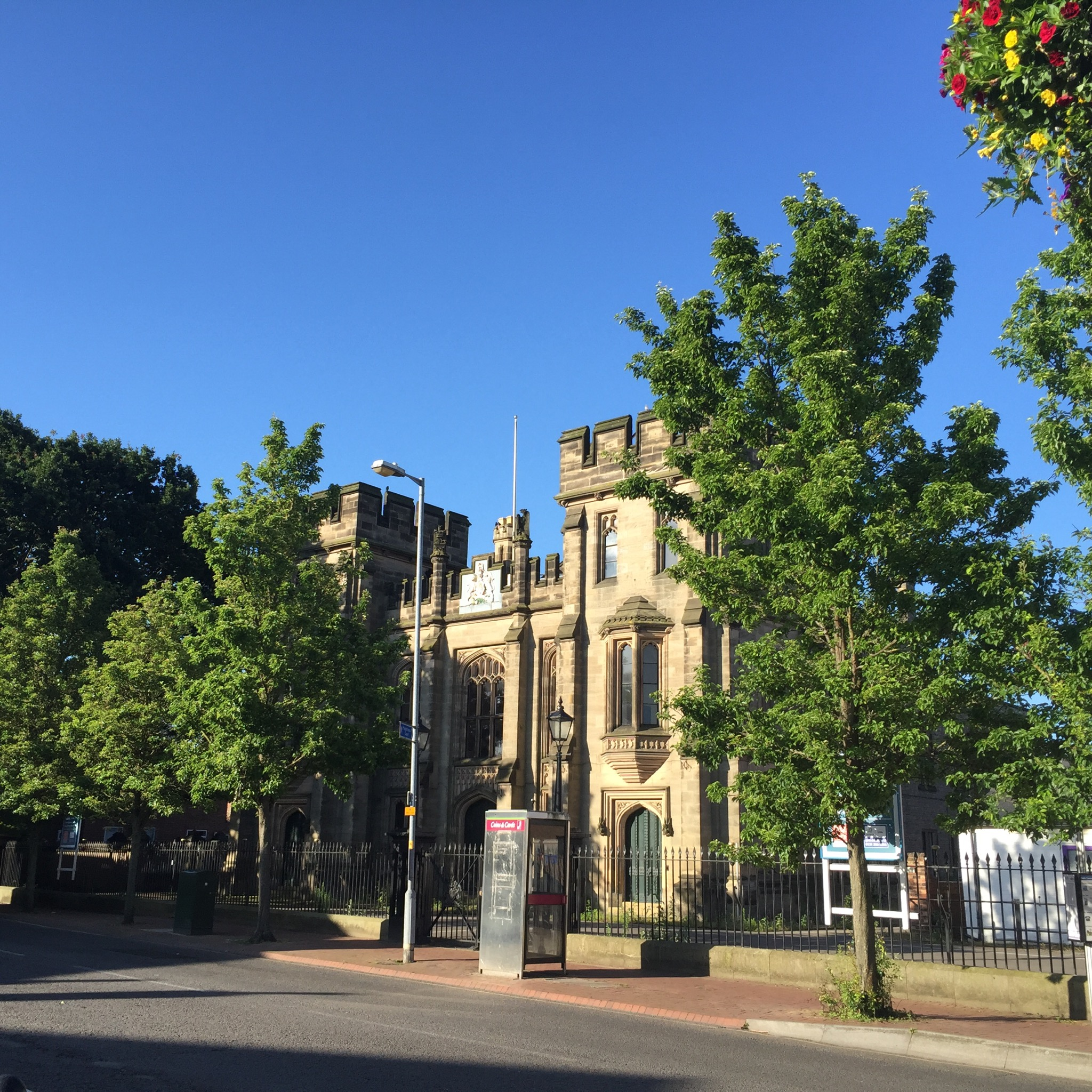
- Spalding Sessions House

- Shown in Lincolnshire
- 52.7867°N 0.1541°W
- Location: Sheep Market, Spalding

History
- Built: 1843

Site notes
- Architect: Charles Kirk
- Architectural style: Gothic revival style

Listed Building – Grade II
- Official name: Spalding Sessions House
- Designated: 20 November 1975
- Reference no.: 1063960

Spalding Sessions House is a judicial structure in the Sheep Market in Spalding, Lincolnshire, England. The structure, which used to be the main courthouse for the south of Parts of Holland, is a Grade II listed building.

== History ==
The first venue for the quarter sessions in Spalding was the old town hall in the triangular open space in Hall Place, which was commissioned by John Hobson, and dated back to about 1620. However, in the 1830s, the justices complained that the town hall was too small for them and it was agreed to commission a new sessions house. The site they selected in the Sheep Market was adjacent to a new prison which had been erected in 1825 to replace an earlier House of Correction in Broad Street which had dated from 1619.

The new sessions house was designed by Charles Kirk from Sleaford, built in ashlar stone at a cost of £6,000 and was officially opened on 30 June 1843. The design involved a symmetrical main frontage of five bays facing onto the Sheep Market. The central section of three bays featured an arched doorway flanked by two bi-partite mullioned and transomed windows, all with traceried panels above; on the first floor there was a large tri-partite mullioned and transomed window flanked by two bi-partite mullioned and transomed windows. The bays were separated by buttresses surmounted by statues of lions and, at roof level, there was a crenelated parapet which was decorated by a panel bearing the Royal coat of arms. The end bays, which were projected forward, took the form of three-stage towers with doorways in the first stage, oriel windows in the second stage and pairs of narrow windows in the third stage; the towers were also surmounted by crenelated parapets. Internally, the principal rooms were the courtroom as well as a series of prison cells on the ground floor.

The building continued to be used as a facility for dispensing justice but, in 2012, the building was declared no longer fit for purpose and magistrates court hearings were transferred to Boston. In 2016, the building was acquired by food production specialists, Oliver and Dorota Sneath, and works were initiated to convert the sessions house into a mix of residential accommodation and leisure space. The building was purchased in 2024 by Chinese American entrepreneur Erika Yao. The original courtroom retains many of its original Victorian features, while the former magistrate's room has been transformed into a stately home-style gallery space. The second courtroom now operates as a modern, tropical-themed bar. The former clerk's office has been redesigned as a chinoiserie-style library, housing historic artefacts from China and Japan. Additionally, the building's two turret file storage rooms have been renovated into bridal dressing suites: "The Camellia" and "The Evermore". The building is licensed for outdoor and indoor weddings and civil partnership ceremonies.

== See also ==
- Boston Sessions House (built to a very similar design)
- Definition of a Sessions House
