= Boston Sessions House =

Municipal building in Boston, England

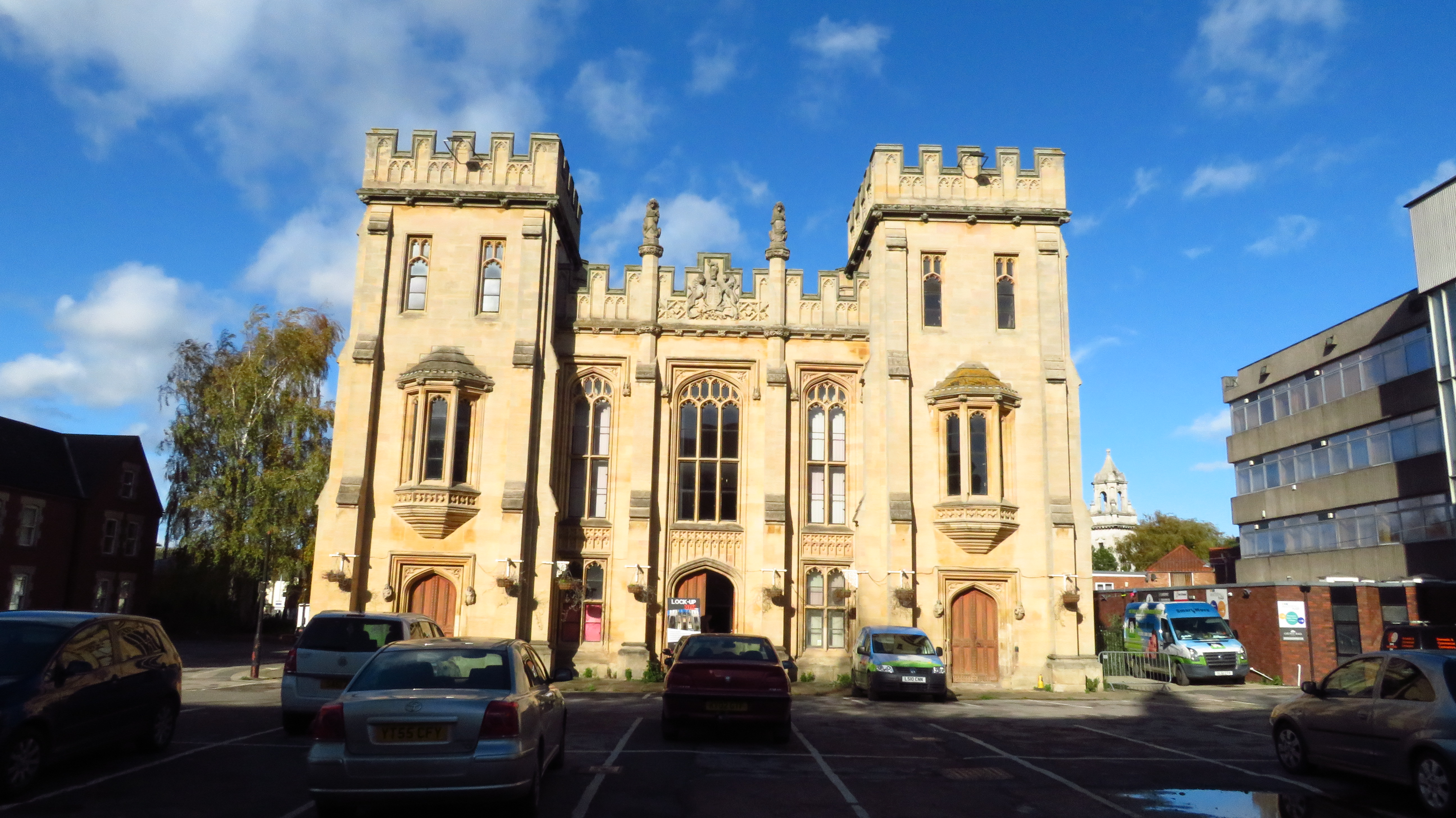
- Boston Sessions House

- Shown in Lincolnshire
- 52.9793°N 0.0248°W
- Location: Church Close, Boston

History
- Built: 1842

Site notes
- Architect: Charles Kirk
- Architectural style: Gothic revival style

Listed Building – Grade II*
- Official name: Boston Sessions House
- Designated: 14 February 1975
- Reference no.: 1388845

Boston Sessions House is a judicial structure in Church Close, Boston, Lincolnshire, England. The structure, which used to be the main courthouse for the north of Parts of Holland, is a Grade II* listed building.

== History ==
The first venue for the quarter sessions in Boston was the Guildhall which had been used for that purpose since 1660. However, in the 1830s, the justices complained that the guildhall was too small for them and it was agreed to commission a new sessions house. The site they selected, just to the north of St Botolph's Church, had been occupied by an Augustine priory.

The new building was the designed by Charles Kirk from Sleaford, built in ashlar stone at a cost of £10,000 and was officially opened on 17 October 1843. The design involved a symmetrical main frontage of five bays facing Church Close. The central section of three bays featured an arched doorway flanked by two bi-partite mullioned and transomed windows, all with traceried panels above; on the first floor there was a large tri-partite mullioned and transomed window flanked by two bi-partite mullioned and transomed windows. The bays were separated by buttresses surmounted by statues of lions and, at roof level, there was a crenellated parapet which was decorated by a panel bearing the Royal coat of arms. The end bays, which were projected forward, took the form of three-stage towers with doorways in the first stage, oriel windows in the second stage and pairs of narrow windows in the third stage; the towers were also surmounted by crenellated parapets. Internally, the principal rooms were the prison cells on the ground floor, a magistrates' retiring room on the first floor and a strong room on the second floor: the main courtroom was at the back of the building.

The building continued to be used as a facility for dispensing justice but, following the implementation of the Local Government Act 1888, which established county councils in every county, it also became the meeting place of Holland County Council. After the county council moved to a dedicated building known as County Hall, which was erected on the same site just to southeast of the sessions house in 1927, the sessions house was used solely for judicial purposes.

The building fell vacant after the magistrates moved to a new courthouse in Norfolk Street in 2003. In 2016, developers, Paul and Amy Wilkinson took possession of the whole site (including the sessions hall, county hall and county hall annex) with a view to converting the buildings for alternative use. Works to convert the prison cells in the sessions house into a gym were initiated in February 2020. The sessions house featured in the ITV drama series, Wild Bill, in 2019.

== See also ==
- Grade II* listed buildings in Boston (borough)
- Spalding Sessions House (built to a very similar design)
