= Sessions house =

Type of courthouse in the UK

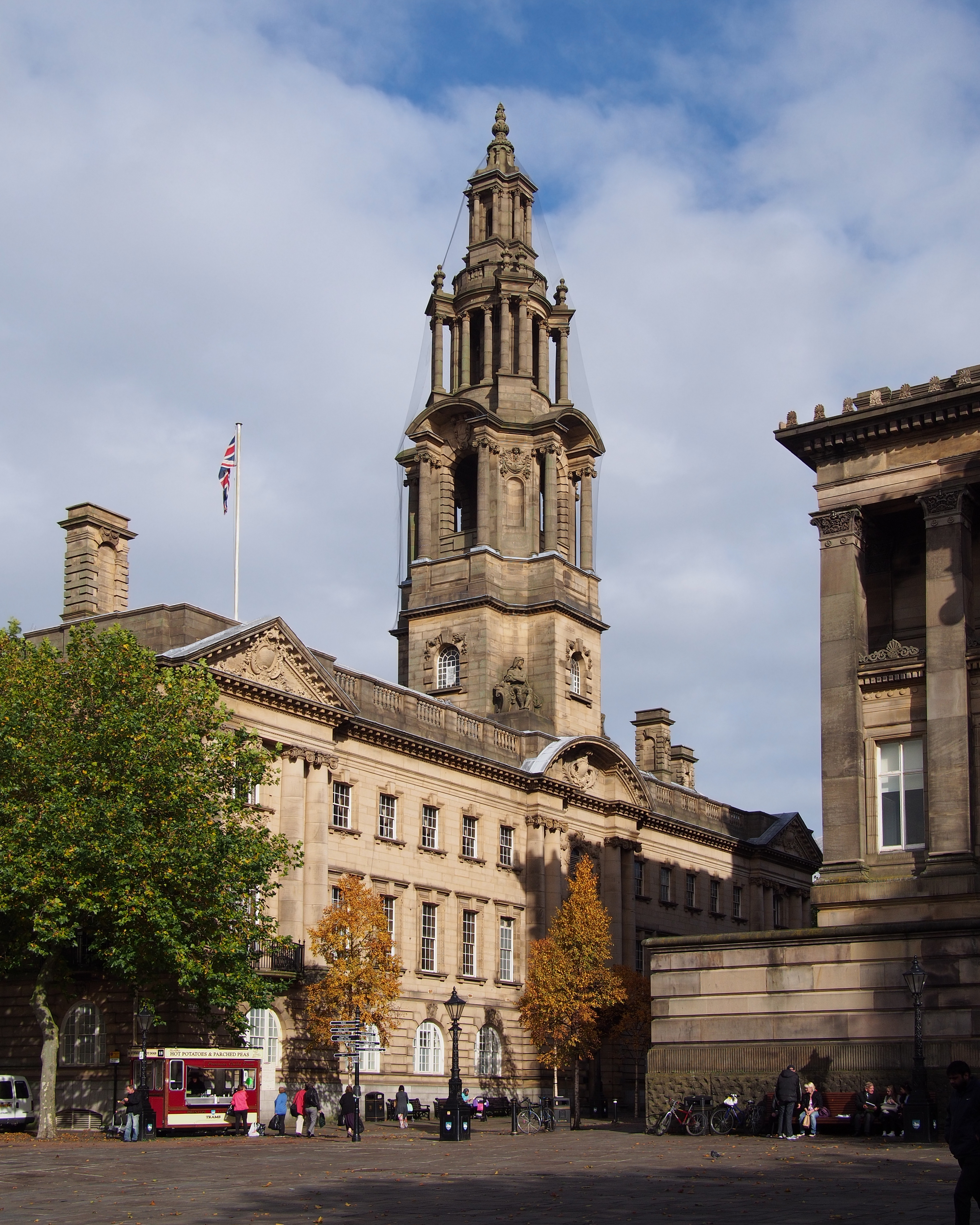
Sessions House, Preston, Lancashire, UK (built 1900–1903)

A sessions house in the United Kingdom was historically a courthouse that served as a dedicated court of quarter sessions, where criminal trials were held four times a year on quarter days. Sessions houses were also used for other purposes to do with the administration of justice, for example as a venue for the courts of assize (assizes). The courts of quarter sessions and assize, which did not necessarily sit in dedicated premises, were replaced in England by a permanent Crown Court by the Courts Act 1971, and in 1975 in Scotland by other courts. Several buildings formerly used as sessions houses are still named "Sessions House"; some are still used for the administration of justice (e.g., London Sessions House, now the Central Criminal Court at the Old Bailey), while others have different uses. Some are listed buildings of architectural importance.

An incomplete list of English and Welsh sessions houses:

- Central Criminal Court at the Old Bailey, formerly sessions house of the Lord Mayor and Sheriffs of the City of London and of Middlesex
- Sessions House, Beverley, a former courthouse in East Riding of Yorkshire
- Sessions House, Boston, a former courthouse in Lincolnshire
- Sessions House, Clerkenwell, a former courthouse in the London Borough of Islington
- Sessions House, Ely, a former courthouse in Cambridgeshire
- Sessions House, Knutsford, a former courthouse in Cheshire
- Sessions House, Liverpool, a former courthouse in Liverpool
- Sessions House, Northampton, a former courthouse in Northamptonshire
- Sessions House, Peterborough, a former courthouse in Cambridgeshire
- Sessions House, Preston, a courthouse in Lancashire
- Sessions House, Sleaford, a former courthouse in Lincolnshire
- Sessions House, Spalding, a former courthouse in Lincolnshire
- Sessions House, Usk, a former courthouse in Monmouthshire, Wales

An incomplete list of Irish sessions houses, for the period up to c. 1900 under British rule.

- Sessions House, Dublin, Ireland.
- Sessions House, Market Square, Roscommon, Ireland

Some buildings in the US are known as "Sessions House"; some are on the National Register of Historic Places:

- Sessions House (Painesville, Ohio)
- Sessions–Pope–Sheild House, Yorktown, Virginia
