= County Hall, Boston =

County building in Boston, Lincolnshire, England

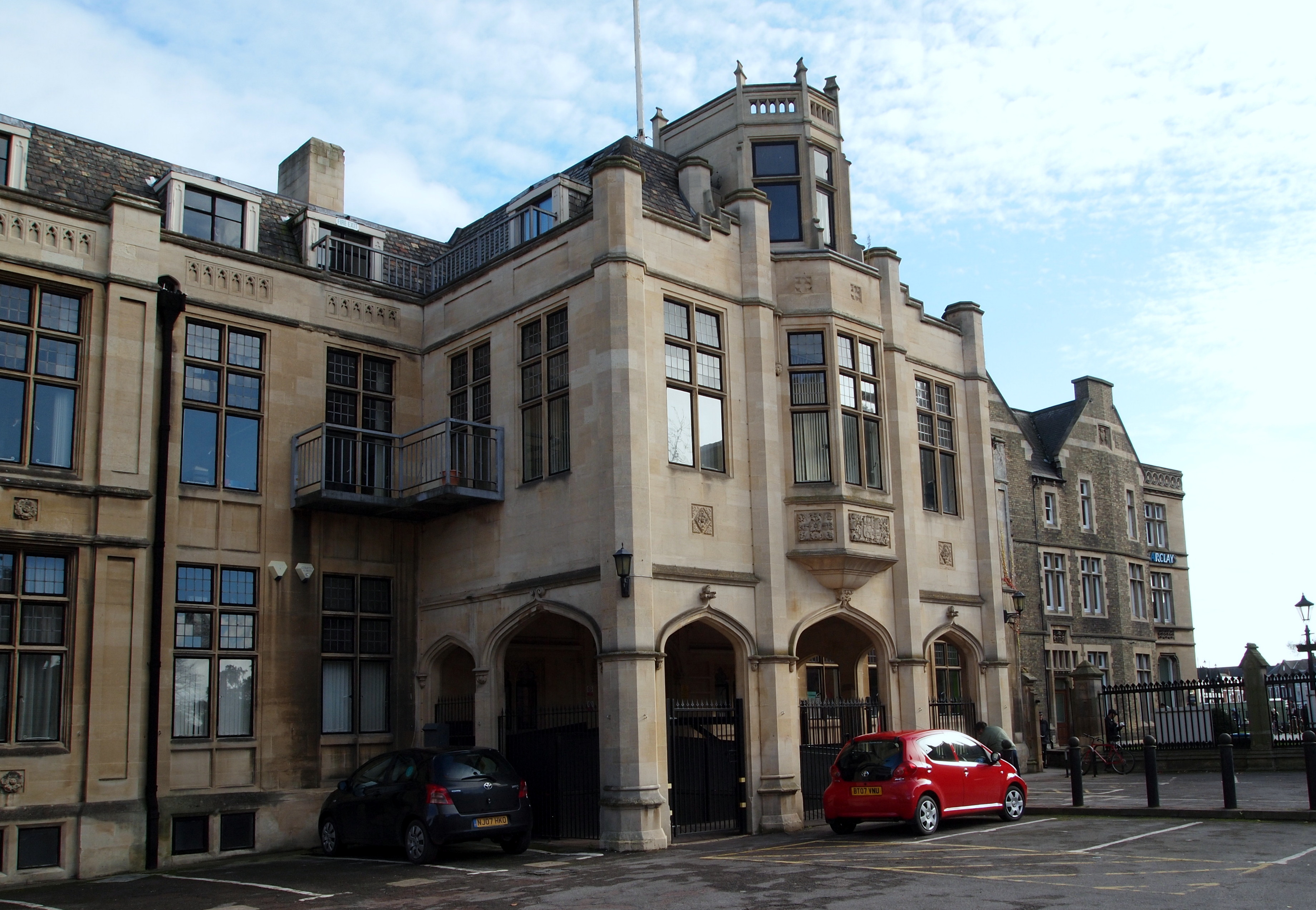
- The building in 2014

- Shown in Lincolnshire
- 52.9790°N 0.0243°W
- Location: Church Close, Boston

History
- Built: 1927

Site notes
- Architectural style: Gothic revival style

County Hall is a municipal building in Church Close in Boston, a town in Lincolnshire, in England. It served as the offices and meeting place of Holland County Council.

== History ==
Following the implementation of the Local Government Act 1888, which established county councils in every county, The county council of the Parts of Holland secured accommodation in the Sessions House in Boston. After finding that arrangement unsatisfactory, county leaders decided to commission dedicated offices. The site they selected was on the east side of the square off Church Close where some older buildings had once stood.

The new building was designed in the Gothic revival style, built in ashlar stone and was completed in 1927. The design involved a symmetrical main frontage of 11 bays facing onto the square. The central section of three bays was projected forward to form a full height porte-cochère. There were three arches with hood moulds on the ground floor, an oriel window in the central bay on the first floor, and an observation window with a ballustraded parapet and finials above. The rest of the building was fenestrated by mullioned and transomed windows. The roofline was lightly castellated and, internally, the principal room was the council chamber.

A four-storey building designed in the modern style and known as the County Hall Annex was erected to the north of county hall in the mid-20th century. The Holland County Council was abolished when the newly formed Lincolnshire County Council was formed at the County Offices in Lincoln in 1974. The local public library service subsequently relocated to county hall.

In 2016, developers, Paul and Amy Wilkinson took possession of the whole site (including the sessions hall, county hall and county hall annex) with a view to converting the buildings for alternative use. The public library continued to operate on the ground floor of county hall but the upper floors were converted to create the County Hall Business Centre with 19 business units. The ground floor of the annex was subsequently converted for retail use and was re-opened by the boxer, Callum Johnson, as Waterfall Plaza in December 2016. The upper floors of the annex were converted for use as an apartment hotel and reopened as such in summer 2017.

Meanwhile, in county hall, the library was closed for five weeks in April 2023 to allow alterations to be made to the building: the alteration work involved creating a dedicated library entrance at the back of the building in Bank Street so that a substantial part of the building could also be converted for use as a hotel.
