= Charles Kirk (architect, born 1791) =

British builder and architect (1791–1847)

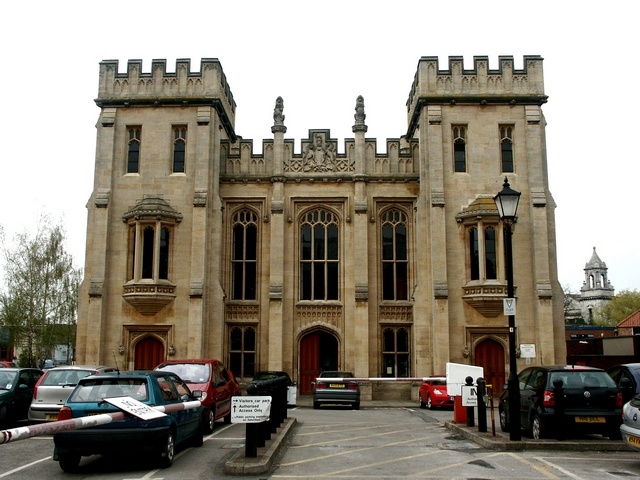
- Boston Sessions House
- Born: 10 March 1791; Wigston Magna, Leicestershire, England
- Died: 1847 (aged 55–56); Sleaford, Lincolnshire, England
- Occupation: Architect
- Practice: Kirk and Parry

Charles Kirk (1791–1847) was a British builder and architect who worked on many buildings in Sleaford and South Lincolnshire, England.

== Early life ==
Kirk was born on 10 March 1791 in Wigston Magna, Leicestershire. The Kirk family had long been connected with the building trade and Charles' father, William (1749–1823), was a builder and architect in Leicester.

== Career ==
Charles Kirk came to Sleaford in 1829 to undertake the building of the new Sessions House at Sleaford which had been designed by the London architect H E Kendall and when the work was completed he decided to stay in Sleaford. In the years that followed, Kirk's building business and architectural practice flourished and he was involved in the construction or planning of many of Sleaford's new buildings, including Carre's Hospital, Carre's Grammar School (1834) and the Gasworks (1838). He formed a partnership with Thomas Parry, who had been an articled clerk with Kirk's firm. In 1841, Parry married Charles Kirk's daughter, Henrietta. Following Charles Kirk's death in 1847, the firm was taken over by his son, also called Charles in partnership with Parry. The business continued to prosper and Kirk and Parry established a countrywide reputation for their railway buildings and church restorations. Kirk was buried at Quarrington near Sleaford.

=== Account book and journal ===
Fortunately Kirk’s journal and account book have survived and are now held by the Lincolnshire Archives Office. The journal covers the period 1828-32. A particularly interesting entry is 30 October 1828: "At Sleaford and Lincoln. I was very much pleased with Smirk's [sic] County hall. There is an ancient grandeur about this modern edifice". This entry shows the great influence that Robert Smirke’s Gothic Revival County Hall in Lincoln Castle had on Kirk. The Gothic revival was a style which Kirk was to adopt, very successfully for many of his buildings in Sleaford and elsewhere in Lincolnshire. The accounts at the back of the journal provide a record of the many surveying and building projects undertaken by Kirk over the period 1833-1848. He frequently carried out work on many of the bridges in the Sleaford area. He was the main building contractor for the Stamford architect Bryan Browning for Folkingham House of Correction and supervised extensive alterations to Browning’s Bourne Town Hall in 1845.

== Architectural work ==
=== Public buildings ===
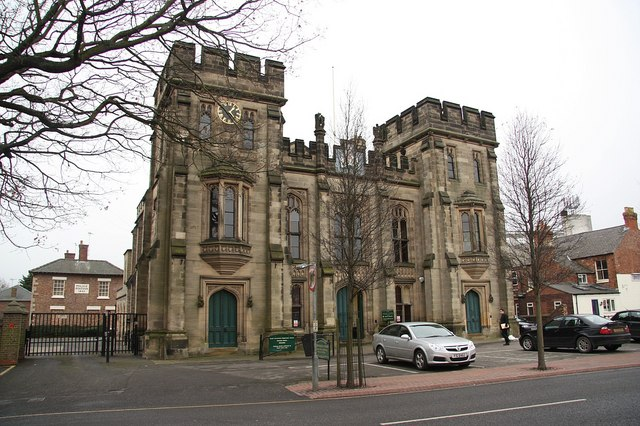
Spalding Sessions House

The Sessions House in Boston, Lincolnshire, was built between 1841 and 1842 and very similar to the Sessions House in Spalding (which was completed in 1843). The new building accommodated the Quarter Sessions and the Kirton and Skirbeck Bench. It has been subject to very few alterations, most of which have been carried out in the custody and service areas located to the rear of the ground floor. The custody area has four cells which were labelled on the original plans (the location of which is now unknown) as ‘Male Felon at Hard Labour’, ‘Male Felon not at Hard Labour’, ‘Female Felon at Hard Labour’ and ‘Common Ward’. The Sessions House ceased to be used as a Magistrates Court in 2003.

The Sessions House in Spalding, Lincolnshire, was built in 1842 to 1843 and was designed by Charles Kirk and erected at a cost of £6,000. It was opened on 30 June 1843. There are two crenellated side towers and a recessed centre, which is two storeys high, with three bays divided by buttresses. In the centre are heraldic beast finials. There are three windows between the buttresses with 'Perpendicular' tracery and a central four-centred doorway.

=== Houses ===
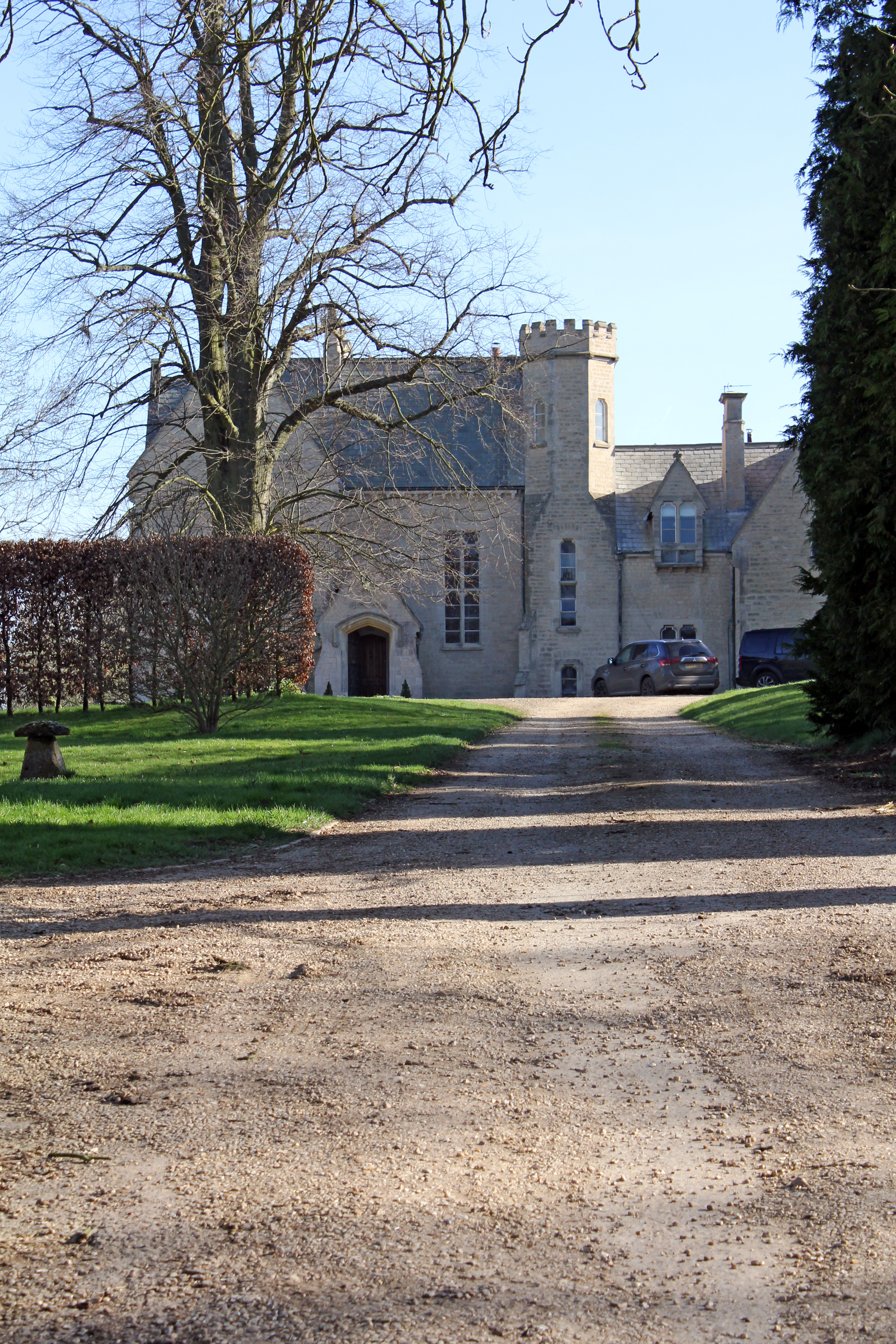
The Old Manor House, Main Street, Ingoldsby, 1847

- Hagnaby Priory. A large Tudor Gothic house of 1835. It is now largely demolished.
- Ingoldsby, Old Manor House. Former Rectory of 1847. Gothic with Octagonal tower.
- Manor House, Northgate, Sleaford. Manor House and adjoining stone-built properties, including Rhodes House (premises of Cole, Dickin and Hills, accountants), a hotch potch of buildings, originally dating from C17th, with much restoration carried out in C19th by Charles Kirk.
- Swaton Court. Swaton Court was built as the vicarage in 1844 by Charles Kirk. Tudoresque, brick with stone dressings.
- The Mansion House, Southgate, Sleaford. The Kirk family house. Started before 1847 and Kirk was living here at the time of his death. Since 1902 the Kesteven and Sleaford High School, Jacobean revival style, with three gables and built in local stone.

=== Churches ===
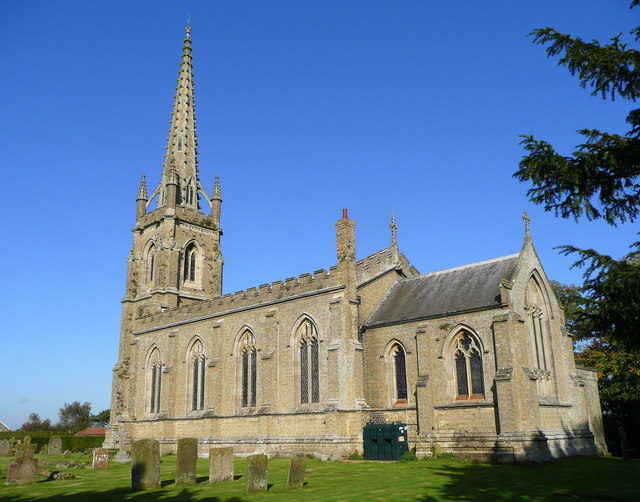
St. Andrew's church, Sausthorpe

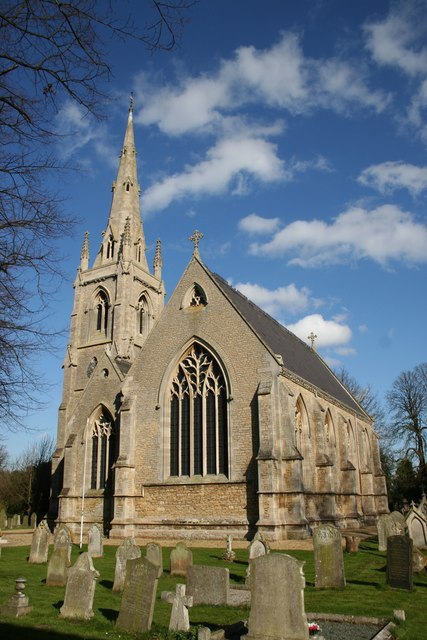
Deeping St.Nicholas church

- Deeping St Nicholas. Charles Kirk, designed the church in mid-14th century style in Ancaster stone with a dramatic broached pinnacled tower and spire with lucarnes. He based his details on other local churches. The foundation stone was laid in August 1845 and the church was consecrated in 1846.
- Sausthorpe, near Spilsby, Linolncolnshie. Church of 1844. Brick with spire and Perpendicular window tracery. Imitates the sire and flying buttress of Louth parish church.

=== School ===
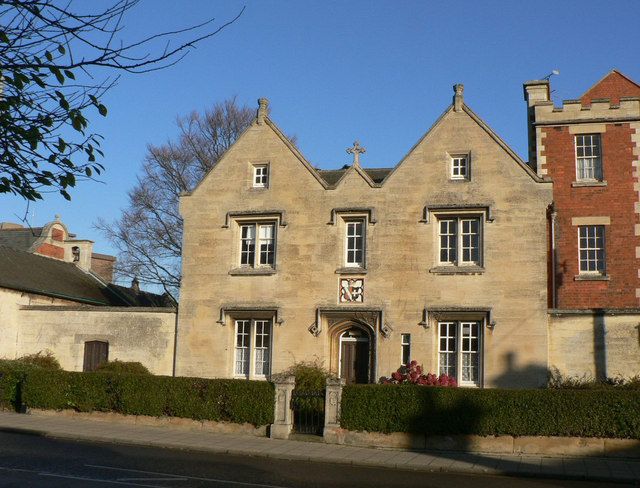
Carre's Grammar School, Sleaford 1834

- The Grammar School Sleaford. Gabled tudoresque. In 1834, the Court of Chancery agreed to fund the rebuilding of the school according to plans by the Sleaford architect and builder Charles Kirk, who constructed it at a cost £1,168 15s. The building is in the Tudor Gothic style and built in Ashlar stone with slate roofs. It has three stories of three bays, with the upper floor housed in two gables. A shield with the arms of the Marquis of Bristol and his wife are located above the four-centre arch doorway.

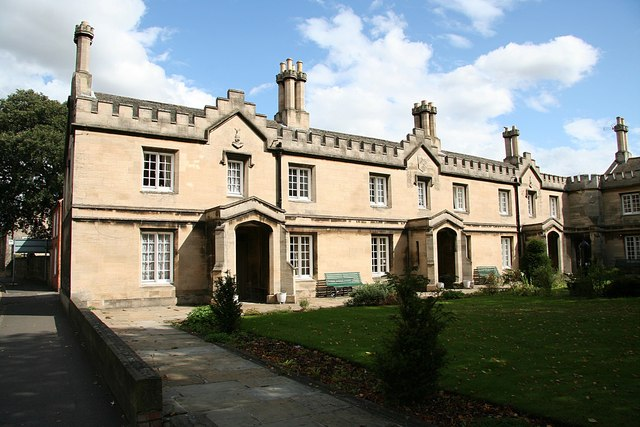
Carre's Hospital

=== Buildings built by Kirk to designs by H. E. Kendall ===
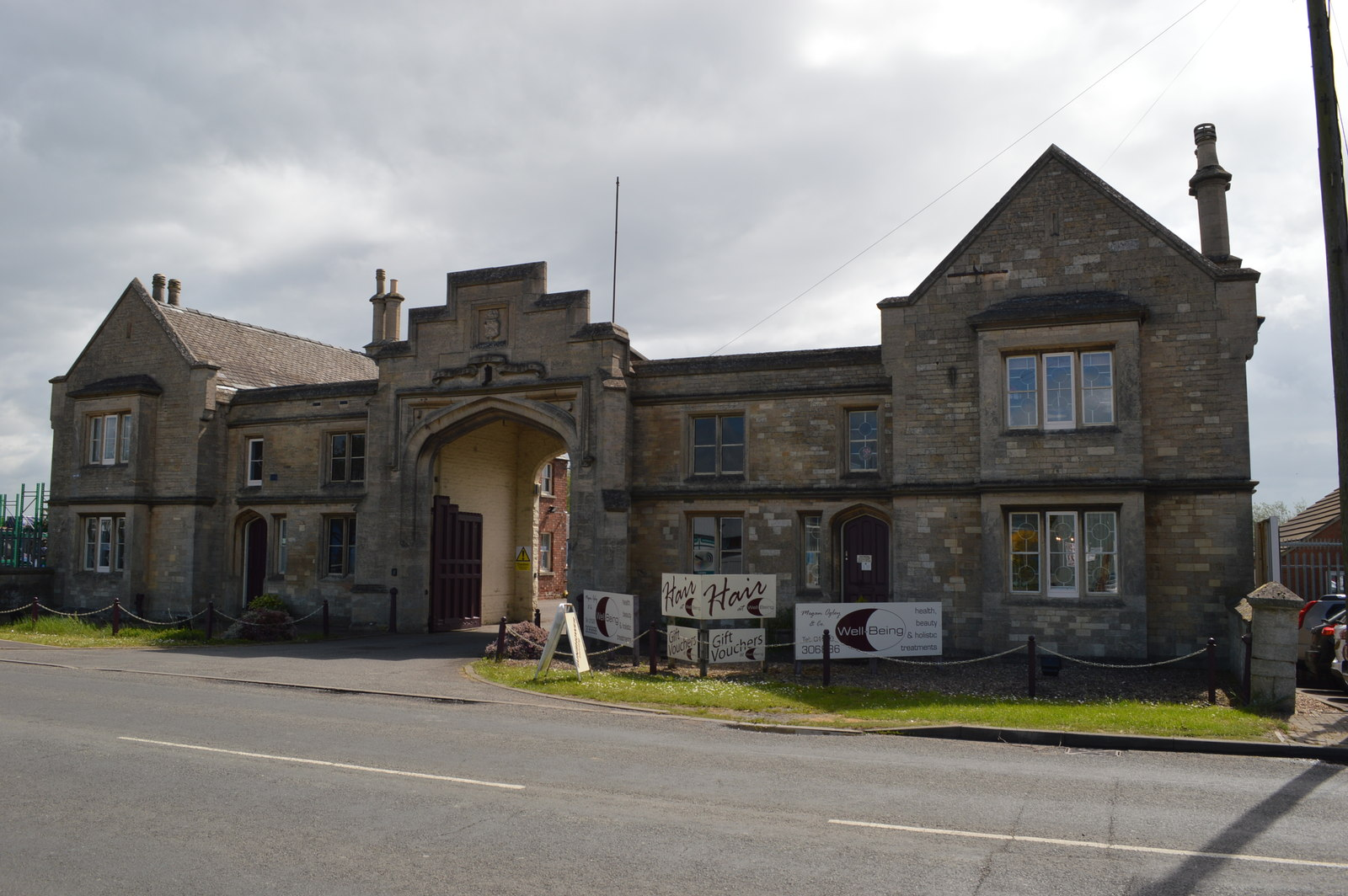
Sleaford Gas Works

- Carre's Hospital, Northgate, Sleaford, 1830. Tudoresque almshouses. Kirk was the contractor for the first range which designed by Kendall, and he was probably responsible for the second range of 1841-46.
- Sleaford Gasworks, Eastgate, Sleaford 1839.

== Literature ==
- Antram N (revised), Pevsner N & Harris J, (1989), The Buildings of England: Lincolnshire, Yale University Press.
- Antonia Brodie (ed), Directory of British Architects, 1834–1914: 2 vols, British Architectural Library, Royal Institute of British Architects, 2001
- David Brock The Competition for the Design of Sleaford Sessions House, 1828 Architectural History Vol. 27, Design and Practice in British Architecture: Studies in Architectural History Presented to Howard Colvin (1984), pp. 344-355. SAHGB Publications
- Pawley S. (1996) "Kirk and Parry [Sleaford builders & architects]" Lincolnshire Past and Present, Number 24, Summer 1996, 3-4.
