= Holland County Council =

Former county council in England

History
- Founded: 1 April 1889
- Disbanded: 1 April 1974
- Succeeded by: Lincolnshire County Council

Meeting place
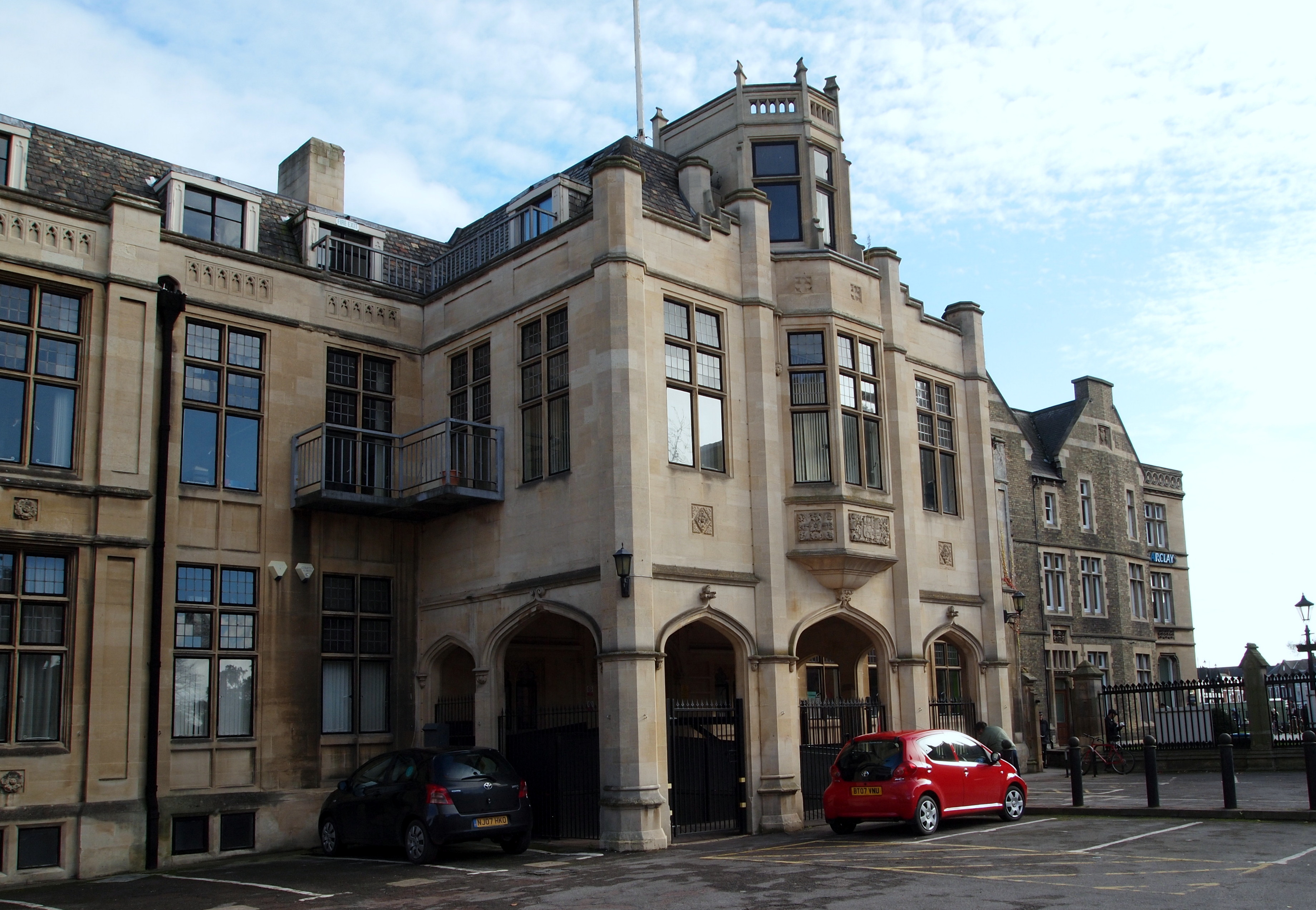
- County Hall, Boston

Holland County Council was the county council of Holland, one of the three Parts of Lincolnshire in eastern England. It came into its powers on 1 April 1889 and was abolished on 1 April 1974. The county council was based at County Hall, Boston. It was amalgamated with Kesteven County Council and Lindsey County Council to form the new Lincolnshire County Council in 1974.
