= Parts of Holland =

One of the historic subdivisions of Lincolnshire, England

Coordinates: 52.8333°N 0.0333°W

Lincolnshire, Parts of Holland
- Area
  - 1901: 268,992 acres (1089 km²)
  - 1961: 267,847 acres (1083 km²)
- Population
  - 1901: 77,610
  - 1971: 105,685
- History
  - Created: 1889
  - Abolished: 1974
  - Succeeded by: Lincolnshire
- Status: Administrative county
- Government: Holland County Council
  - HQ: County Hall, Boston

The Parts of Holland was a historical division of Lincolnshire, England, encompassing the southeast of the county. The name is still recognised locally and survives in the district of South Holland.

== Etymology ==
The place name Holland appears on record in 1060 as Hoylandia and in the Domesday Book (1086) as Hoilant. The name is most often derived from Old English hoh ('a hill-spur') + land; giving the name a meaning of 'district characterised by hill-spurs' or similar. Formally-identical formations are found in the place-names Holland-on-Sea (Essex) and Up Holland (Lancashire). However, the topographical inappropriateness of a place-name referencing hill-spurs being applied to a low-lying region has been noted and Richard Coates has instead argued that the hoi- element in early forms represents a Brittonic *haiw- ('a swamp').

== Administration ==
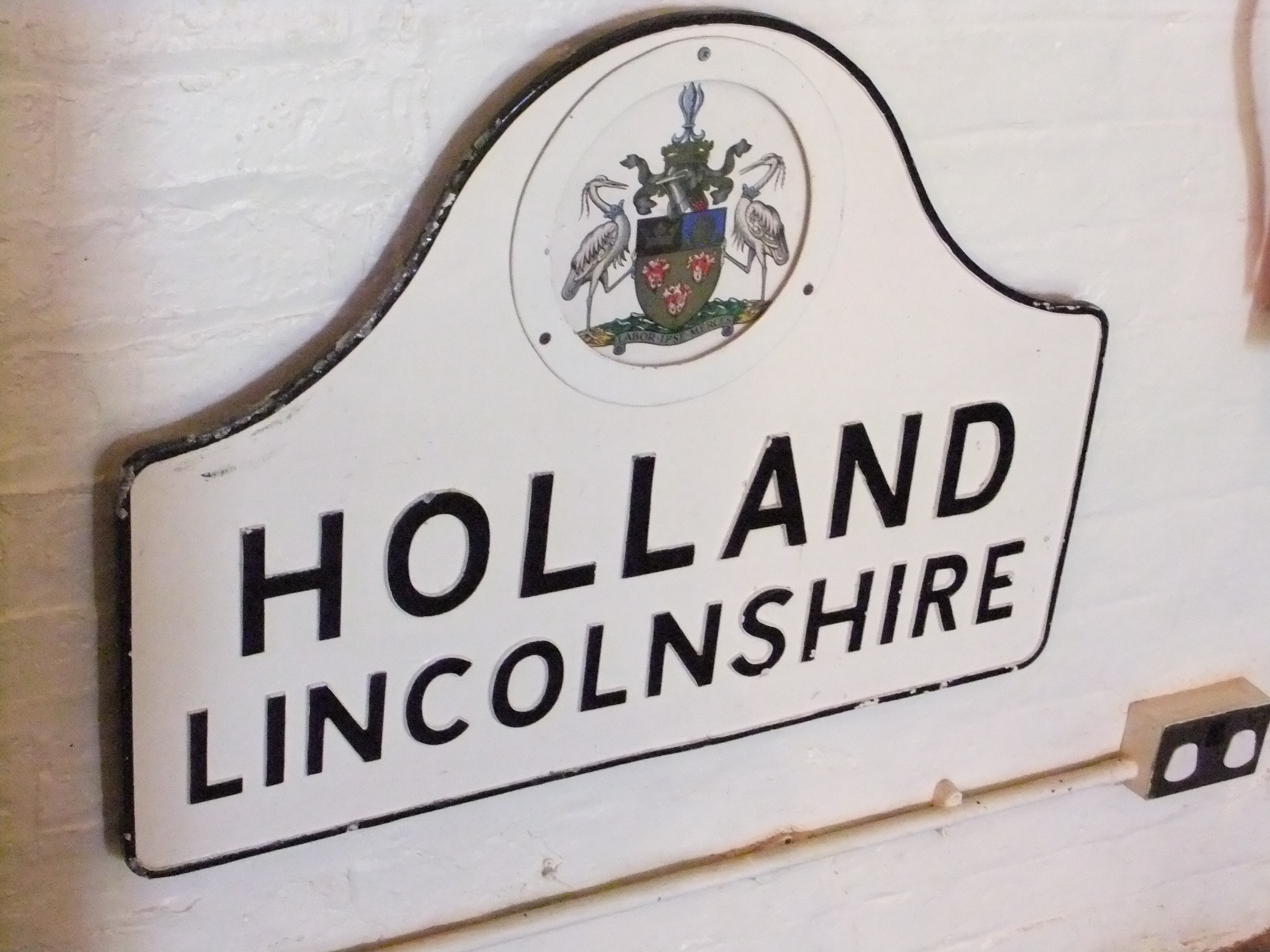
Holland sign on display at the Museum of Lincolnshire Life with the Latin motto Labor Ipse Merces (Work is its own reward)

Parts of Holland was one of the three medieval divisions, called 'Parts', of Lincolnshire (the other two being Lindsey and Kesteven) which had long had separate county administrations (quarter sessions). Under the Local Government Act 1888 it obtained a county council, which it retained until 1974. At that point the three county councils were abolished and Lincolnshire (minus the northern part of Lindsey, which formed part of Humberside) had a single county council for the first time.

Before the changes of 1888, Holland had, since probably the 10th century, been divided into the three wapentakes of Elloe, Kirton and Skirbeck.

Under the Local Government Act 1894, the administrative county of Holland was divided into rural districts and urban districts, with the municipal borough of Boston remaining untouched. The rural districts were Boston, Crowland, East Elloe and Spalding, whilst Holbeach, Long Sutton, Spalding and Sutton Bridge became urban districts.

== Geography ==
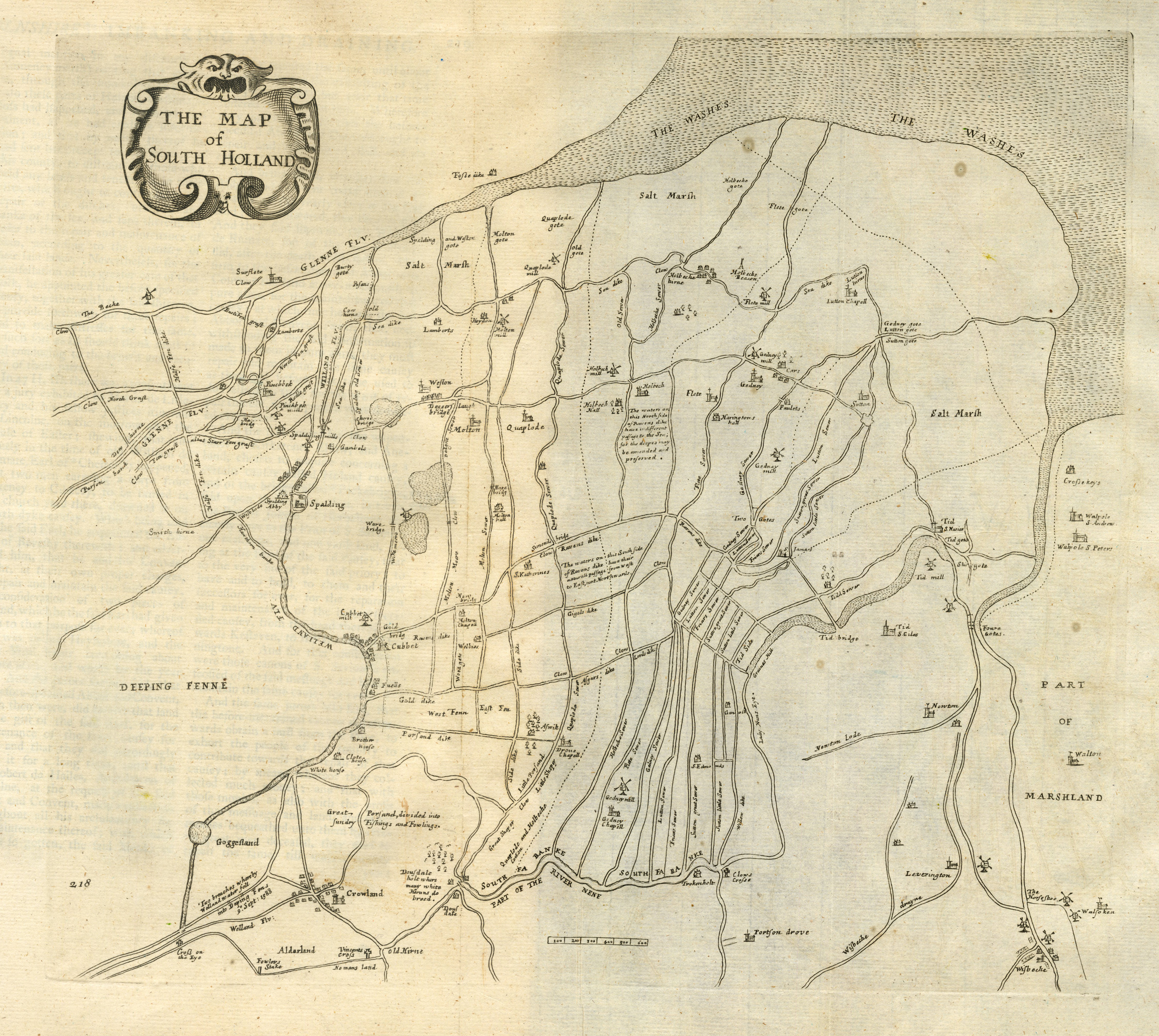
"The Map of South Holland" from The History of Imbanking and Drayning by William Dugdale (1662)

The geographical extent of the former Holland County Council is the same as that of the combined modern local government districts of Boston and South Holland.

Holland is all close to sea level, achieving a maximum altitude of about five metres (16 feet) on artificially raised river banks (levees). It therefore needed carefully managed drainage to maintain the very productive arable farmland which covered almost its entire extent. Consequently, a significant part of its drainage for arable use had to await the introduction of steam pumping. Before the mid-19th century, it was a much more pastoral area, used for fattening livestock brought in from Scotland and northern England before it was driven to market in places like London. Many of the country roads are still called droves.

=== Towns and villages in Holland ===
- Algarkirk
- Boston
- Crowland
- Donington
- Gosberton
- Holbeach
- Kirton-in-Holland
- Long Sutton
- Swineshead
- Spalding
- Sutterton
- Sutton Bridge

== See also ==
- Earl of Holland
