= Arthur Sutton Valpy =

English cleric (1849–1909)

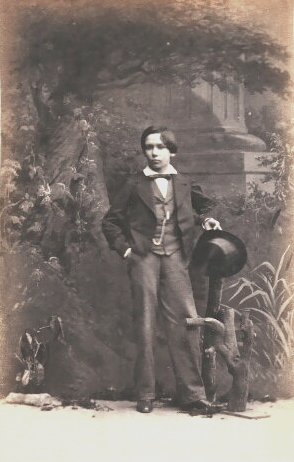
Arthur Sutton Valpy, 1862 photograph

Arthur Sutton Valpy (28 March 1849 – 15 June 1909) was an English cleric and benefactor, from 1895 canon of Winchester Cathedral.

== Early life and education ==
He was the son of Richard Valpy of the Board of Trade, and his wife Emily Ann(e) Sutton, daughter of Daniel Sutton of Tring. His father, born 1820, was the eldest son of Richard Valpy (1783–1852) (the eldest son of Richard Valpy the noted schoolmaster), employed as an official assignee in Birmingham, and his wife Phoebe Rowe. He joined the Board of Trade in 1841, brought into its statistical department by George Richardson Porter. He became a Fellow of the Statistical Society in 1842, wrote papers for its journal, and was an official delegate to international statistical conferences, retiring in 1876. He died in 1889 at Champneys, Tring.

His mother was a beneficiary under the Slave Compensation Act 1837 of compensation for plantations owned in British Guiana by her Rogers aunts; her father inherited Champneys in 1842, and died in 1871 leaving much property in London. He was in business as a carpet manufacturer at Wilton, Wiltshire. Emily Ann Valpy was his residual heir, of an estate worth around £90,000, and inherited his freehold estates. She died in 1893, leaving over £57,000. The Valpys and the Suttons had been London neighbours in Earls Terrace.

Valpy was educated at Eton College, which he left in 1864. He was admitted in 1868 to Gonville and Caius College, Cambridge. In 1870 he went with a reading party led by Arthur John Butler, then at Trinity College, to Clovelly. He graduated B.A. in 1873 and M.A. in 1876.

== Clerical career ==
Valpy was ordained deacon at York in 1873, and priest the following year, serving curacies at Middlesbrough, 1873 to 1875, and at Kensington, 1875 to 1878. He was rector of Farnborough from 1878 to 1882. He served as warden to the Church of England Soldiers' Institute and acting chaplain to the forces as Aldershot and as Rector of Holy Trinity, Guildford. He was appointed Canon Residentiary of Winchester Cathedral in 1895.

In December 1901, Valpy and his second wife left London for South Africa, where he acted as Archdeacon of Kimberley and Rector of St Cyprian's Church during 1902. The altar from St Edward's Church, Kenilworth, in Kimberley, South Africa, now at St Cyprian's Cathedral, bears an inscription in memory of "Arthur Sutton Valpy, Canon of Winchester, England, who fell asleep 15 June 1909. While in charge of S. Cyprian's Kimberley, he assisted S. Edward’s in every way. R.I.P".

Returning to the United Kingdom, Valpy was rural dean of Winchester from 1904 to 1907.

== Residences ==
=== Champneys estate ===
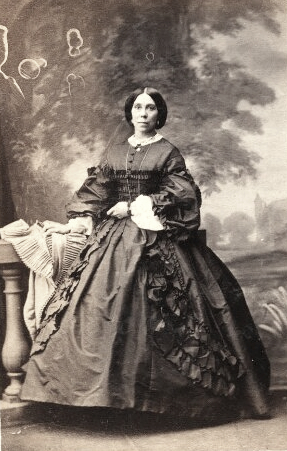
Emily Ann Valpy, 1861 photograph

Valpy's mother Emily inherited in 1871 Champneys, a country house estate at Wigginton, Hertfordshire. A survey of 1873 showed Richard Valpy owning 331 acres (134 ha) in Hertfordshire. Over time she increased the area of the estate by about 200 acres (81 ha).

Valpy rebuilt the house in 1874. Much later he sold it to Lady Rothschild between 1900 and 1902.

=== 3, The Close, Winchester ===
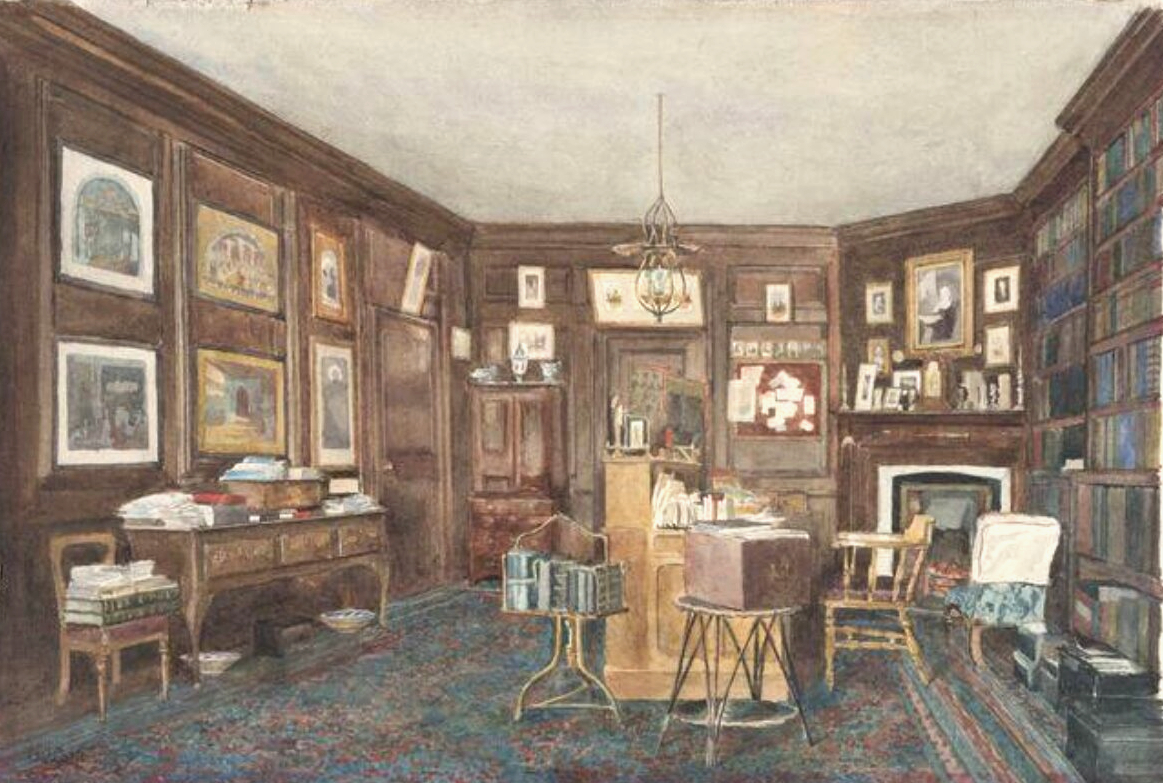
Canon Arthur Sutton Valpy's study, watercolour view c.1900

Valpy's name appears in an address book belonging to James McNeill Whistler in the 1870s, when he was first married and was for a time a curate in Kensington. The interior decoration of his Winchester home is documented in interiors painted in watercolours by Beatrice Olive Corfe, around the time of his second marriage in 1900, now in the Victoria and Albert Museum in London,. It has been commented that the decor "reveals a somewhat provincial version of the taste for pictures and old furniture more usually associated with the aesthetes."

His rooms were furnished without any overt regard for fashion; and yet in their eclectic mix of good eighteenth-century furniture, modern chintz-covered comfortable chairs and uncluttered arrangements of well-chosen books, objects and pictures, they are remarkably similar to the more avant-garde room arrangements of London artists and intellectuals such as Ricketts and Shannon.

Over the mantel in the drawing room was an 1869 drawing by Dante Gabriel Rossetti, a portrait of Jane Morris. The provenance was through Leonard Rowe Valpy. A grandson of Richard Valpy the schoolmaster and nephew of Joshua Rowe, he was uncle to Arthur Valpy, the youngest of the three sons of Richard Valpy (1783–1852).

== Awards and honours ==
Valpy was elected a Fellow of the Society of Antiquaries of London in 1900.

== Family ==
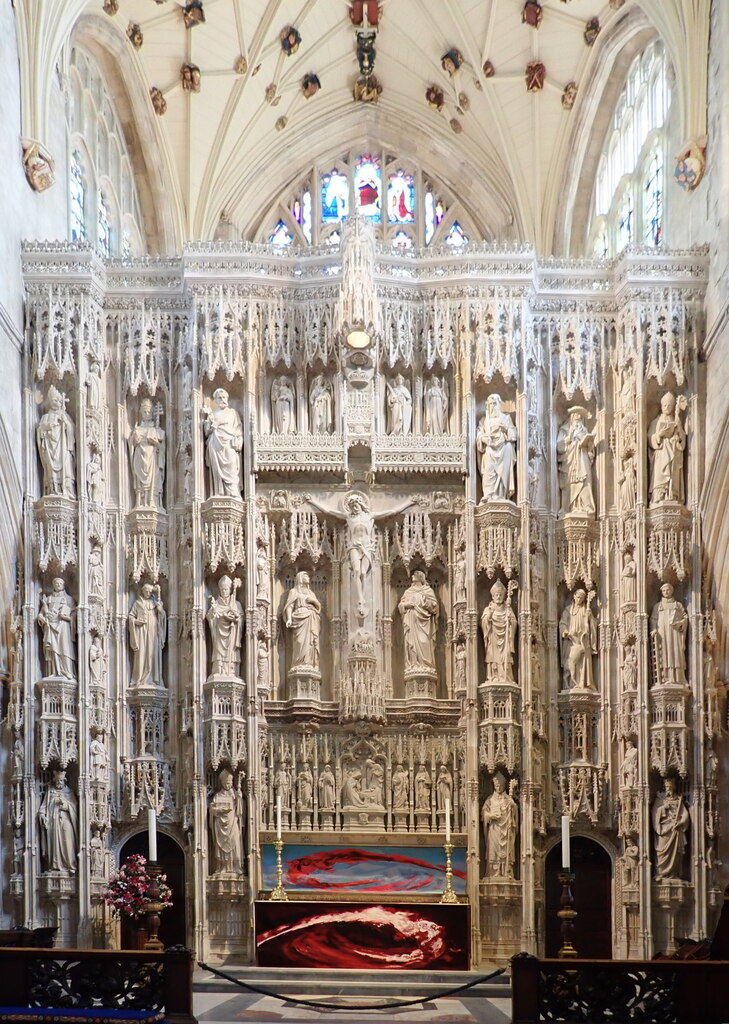
Great screen of Winchester Cathedral, the work in memory of Jessie being the central statue of Christ Crucified, surrounded by the canopy above, the angels on either side, and the pelican at Christ's feet

Valpy was twice married. He married firstly, in 1877, Jessie Margaret Forsyth, third daughter of William Forsyth. After her death in 1897, Valpy financed restoration work on the altar screen of Winchester Cathedral, in her memory, with sculpture carried out by Farmer & Brindley and completed in 1899.

Valpy married secondly, in 1900, Bertha Pattinson of Gateshead (1870–1955), daughter of John Pattinson, an analytical chemist, and his wife Mary Jane Swan, sister of Joseph Wilson Swan. She was later an administrator in the Women's Royal Naval Service in World War I, and was awarded an OBE in 1919.
