= James Osborne (VC) =

Recipient of the Victoria Cross (1857–1928)

James Osborne VC
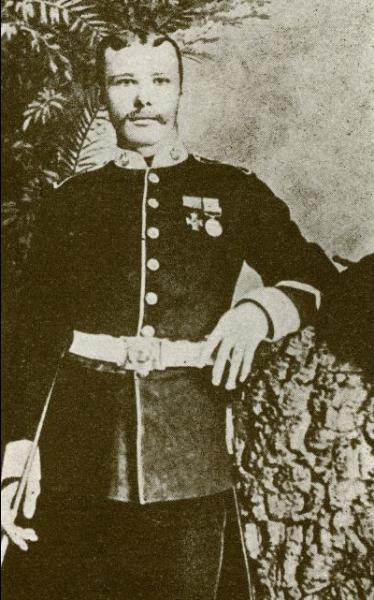
- Osborne in 1882
- Born: 13 April 1857; Wigginton, Hertfordshire, UKGBI
- Died: 1 February 1928 (aged 70); Wigginton, Hertfordshire, UK
- Burial place: St Bartholomew's Church, Wigginton
- Spouse: Rhoda Osborne (m. 1883; died 1925)
- Children: 3
- Military career
- Allegiance: United Kingdom
- Branch: British Army
- Service years: 1876–1883
- Rank: Private
- Units: 58th (Rutlandshire) Regiment of Foot (1876–1881); 2nd Battalion, The Northamptonshire Regiment (1881–1883)
- Conflicts: Anglo-Zulu War: First Boer War; Battle of Majuba Hill; Battle of Schuinshoogte
- Awards: South Africa Medal, 1879; Victoria Cross, 1882
- Other work: Agricultural labourer

James Osborne VC (13 April 1857 – 1 February 1928) was an English agricultural labourer, Private and recipient of the Victoria Cross.

== Early life ==
James Osborne was born on 13 April 1857 in Wigginton to John Osborne, an agricultural labourer, and Mary Osborne (née Coker). Osborne was educated at Wigginton Village School.

Upon leaving school Osborne worked as an agricultural labourer for the Rothschild's Champneys country house and estate.

== Military ==
In December 1876, Osborne enlisted in Hertford and joined the 58th (Rutlandshire) Regiment of Foot. In 1879, Osborne was deployed to present-day South Africa to serve in the Anglo-Zulu War and was subsequently awarded the South Africa Medal.

Osborne served in the First Boer War and fought at the Battle of Majuba Hill and Battle of Schuinshoogte.

=== Victoria Cross ===
In 1882, Osborne was awarded the Victoria Cross for his actions on the 22 February 1981 at Wesselstroom (present day, Wakkerstroom):

For his gallant conduct at Wesselstroom, on the 22nd February, 1881, in riding, under a heavy fire, towards a party of 42 Boers, picking up Private Mayes, who was lying wounded, - and carrying him safely into camp

War Office, March 18, 1882.

At the time of his award Osborne was a private in the 2nd Battalion, The Northamptonshire Regiment. Osborne was awarded the Victoria Cross medal by Lieutenant-general Leicester Smyth at a investiture in Pietermaritzburg, Natal (present-day, KwaZulu-Natal).

== Return to civilian life ==
Osborne was discharged from the army in April 1883, and returned to Wigginton to work as an agricultural labourer at Champneys. On 8 September 1883, Osborne married Rhoda Osborne (née Collier; 1860–1925). Together they had 3 children. In 1913, Osborne was partially paralysed by a stroke.

Osborne died on 1 February 1928 in Wigginton aged 70 and was buried alongside his wife at St Bartholomew’s Church, with full military honours.

== Legacy ==
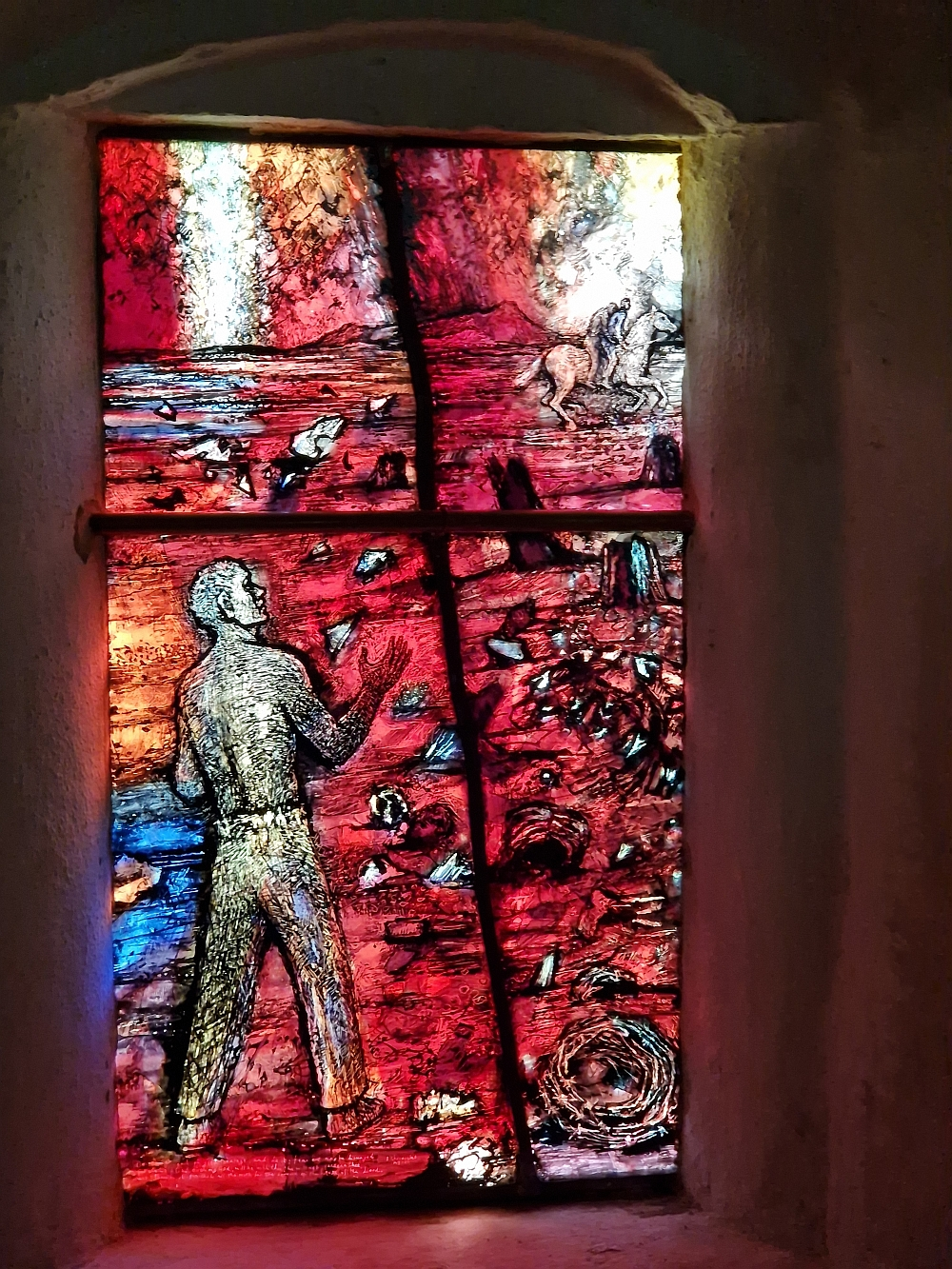
Memorial window to Osborne in St Bartholomew's Church, Wigginton by Thomas Denny

In 1941, Osborne's Victoria Cross was destroyed during the Belfast Blitz.

In 2019, in honour of Osborne a stained glass pulpit window by Thomas Denny was installed at St Bartholomew’s Church, Wigginton.
