= Harry Benjamin (disambiguation) =

Harry Benjamin (1885–1986), German-American endocrinologist and sexologist

Harry Benjamin can also refer to:

- H. Jon Benjamin (born 1966), American actor and comedian
- Harry Benjamin (naturopath) (1896–1966), British naturopath and theosophist
- Harry Benjamin Jepson (1870–1952), American organist and composer
- Harry Benjamin Wolf (1880–1944), American lawyer and politician
