= Leonard Valpy =

Leonard Rowe Valpy (1825–1884) was an English solicitor, known as an art collector and patron. His clients included John Ruskin, and he was a noted purchaser of pictures by Samuel Palmer and Dante Gabriel Rossetti. Charles Augustus Howell compared his aesthetic sensibility to "a tear in a dress-coat".

== Early life ==
He was a younger son of Richard Valpy and his wife Phoebe Rowe, and a grandson of Richard Valpy the noted schoolmaster; Arthur Sutton Valpy was his nephew. He was educated at Reading School, and at age 10 went to Jamaica with Sir Joshua Rowe, his uncle, who was Chief Justice there.

Valpy was in Jamaica for at least 15 years; in 1855 he was in England, and the Society of Arts of Jamaica appointed him their general agent there. In 1856 he became involved in controversy with Robert Temple (1808–1866) over "colonial labour"—imported workers—in Jamaica. In 1857 he took part in a delegation to Prime Minister Lord Palmerston concerning the slave trade of Cuba.

== Legal career ==
Valpy qualified in Jamaica as an attorney-at-law and practised there. He was in partnership with William Wemyss Anderson (1802–1877) and Thomas Hendrick, trading as Anderson, Valpy & Hendrick, and had right of audience in the Supreme Court of Jamaica as a solicitor.

In 1859 Valpy qualified in England as a solicitor. John Ruskin, who became a client, knew of him by 1858, as he wrote to John Giles of The Ancients.

Initially Valpy was in practice on his own, at 60 Carey Street in London's Holborn. He was then junior partner in Cookney, Tuke & Valpy, of 17 Lincoln's Inn Fields, in 1862, later Tuke & Valpy. In 1867 Valpy & Ledsam, solicitors were at the same address. Valpy subsequently went into partnership with Holroyd Chaplin.

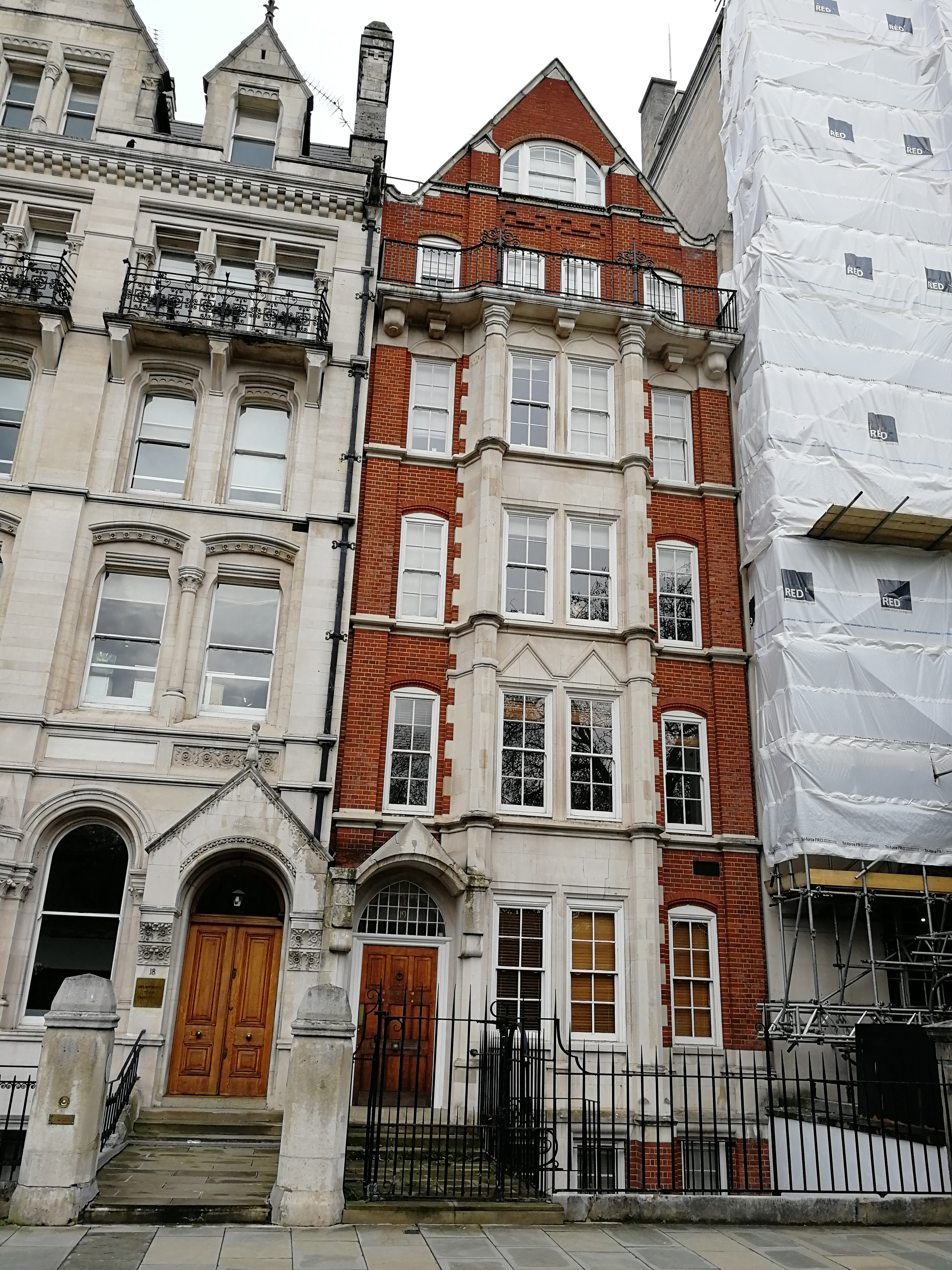
19 Lincoln's Inn Fields, 2026 photograph

Valpy commissioned Philip Webb, in 1868, to design an office block at 19 Lincoln's Inn Fields, London. It was constructed 1869–70. May Morris described it as "a 'street-house', standing unobtrusively when it was built, for all its originality, in the block of old buildings of which it formed part." It became the address of his law partnership Valpy, Chaplin & Peckham, with Holroyd Chaplin and Arthur Wellesley Peckham, which continued after his death.

== Last years, death and legacy ==
Valpy retired around 1878, and towards the end of his life moved to Bath, Somerset. He died of heart disease, aged 59.

In 1899 drawings from his collection were sold in 1899, by Alexander, Daniel & Co. of Bristol, the highest price being for a Vicat Cole.

== Works ==
The 1856 pamphlet Jamaica: Its Existing Condition, with a Few Suggestions for Its Amelioration has been attributed to Valpy. It had contributions from Edward Chitty, and was published in London (W. H. Dalton), for the Society of Arts, for submission to Henry Labouchere, Secretary of State for the Colonies. Chitty and Valpy had worked together on an exhibit for Jamaica at the 1855 Paris Exposition.

== Collector ==
=== Samuel Palmer ===
At the Old Watercolour Society exhibition of 1863, Valpy bought a picture by Samuel Palmer. It led to his commission to Palmer for the "Milton Series" of watercolours, illustrating the works of John Milton.

=== Dante Gabriel Rossetti ===
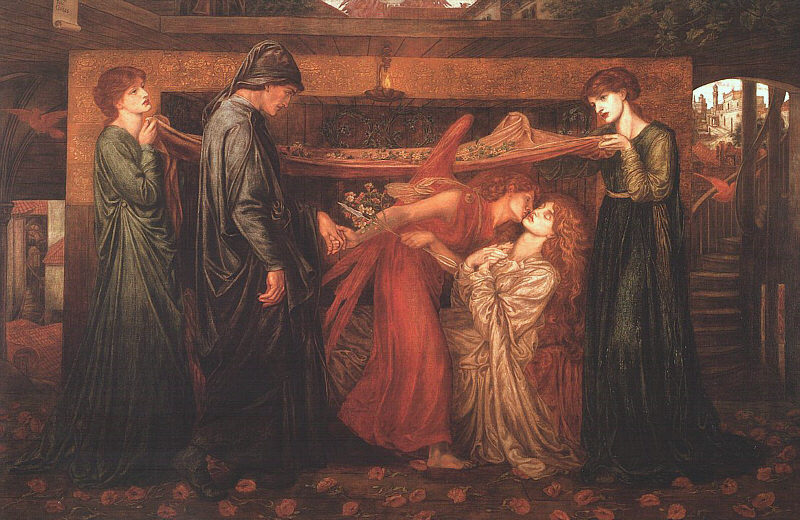
Dante's Dream, Dante Gabriel Rossetti

Valpy was an early purchaser of Rossetti's Dante's Dream (1871), when the collector William Graham decided a smaller version would suit him better. Valpy was later persuaded to exchange it for some other works, in 1878. It went finally to the Walker Gallery in 1881. Both Valpy and Graham were left pictures in Rossetti's will.

== Interests ==
Valpy was in 1874 Secretary of the Female School of Art in London.

== Family ==
Valpy married in 1868 Lucy Waterhouse.
