= Wigginton, Hertfordshire =

Village in Hertfordshire, England

Coordinates: 51.7833°N 0.6387°W

Wigginton
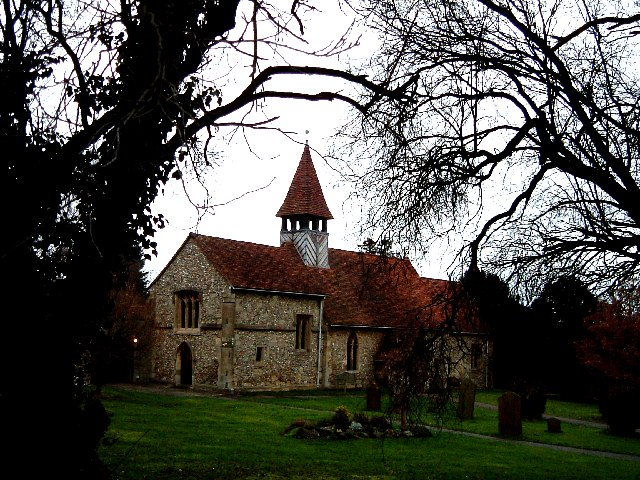
- St. Bartholomew's, Wigginton

- Location within Hertfordshire
- Population: 1,483 {2011 Census}
- OS grid reference: SP939102
- District: Dacorum
- Shire county: Hertfordshire
- Region: East
- Country: England
- Sovereign state: United Kingdom
- Post town: Tring
- Postcode district: HP23
- Dialling code: 01296/01442
- Police: Hertfordshire
- Fire: Hertfordshire
- Ambulance: East of England
- UK Parliament: South West Hertfordshire

Wigginton (Wigentone - 1086) is a village and civil parish located on the edge of the Chiltern Hills in Dacorum, Hertfordshire. It sits 220 m (720 ft) above sea level. The nearest towns are Tring, 1.5 mi (2.4 km) to the North, Chesham, 6 mi (9.7 km) to the South, and Wendover, 6 mi (9.7 km) to the West, with the latter two being in Buckinghamshire. Adjacent to the main village is the settlement of Wigginton Bottom where a number of farmworkers cottages were built during the 19th century.

== History ==
There is evidence of prehistoric settlement, possibly dating from the Iron Age, in the form of Grim's Ditch, with a short length of the Chilterns Hills section remaining just south of the village settlement.

In the 11th century, Wigginton was under the control of Robert, Count of Mortain, a half-brother of William I. However, in 1086 the Domesday Book indicated that Wigginton had not been gifted to him but was probably acquired by force by Robert from two adjacent estates close to Tring, one of which had previously been in the hands of Edith of Wessex. During the 13th century Wigginton formed part of the estate at Little Gaddesden passing first to the de Broc family and then, through marriage to the de Lucys. After the death of Sir William Lucy in 1466 it was in the ownership of the Corbets for over 130 years. The manor was then the subject of successive legal challenges fought out in the Court of Chancery until it came into the possession of Sir Richard Anderson of the manor of Pendley during the 1650s. Elizabeth Spencer (née Anderson) inherited Wigginton and became the third wife of Simon Harcourt, 1st Viscount Harcourt 1703. The manor remained in the Harcourt family until the 1860s. Colonel Charles Harcourt had died in 1831 leaving the manor to his three daughters, Sarah, Elizabeth and Alice who jointly sold it to Rev. James Williams in 1868. Wigginton Common was enclosed in 1854 and was subsequently incorporated into the Tring Park Estate owned at the time by the Rothschild Family.

The Champneys (also recorded as Champneys and Forsters) estate was originally a separate manor associated with Tring and was recorded in the Court Rolls of 1514. It was owned by successive landowning families in the Wigginton and surrounding area between the 14th and 19th centuries, although for a short period around 1535 it is recorded as owned by Thomas Cranmer, the then Archbishop of Canterbury. In 1902 Champneys was sold to Lady Rothschild by the Rev. Arthur Sutton Valpy, a descendant of Richard Valpy who had inherited it in 1871. He replaced the original building by the current house in 1874 which stood in extensive grounds of around 200 acres (0.81 km^{2}) which his late wife Emily Anne Sutton had acquired, prior to their marriage, largely from the vicars of Tring. Stanley Lief (1890 — 1962) converted the stately home of Champneys into a Nature Cure sanatorium which he ran from the 1930s for about 20 years. It is currently a health spa.

== Religion ==
St Bartholomew's Church, built of flint and stone, was first recorded in 1217 and is thought to have had connections with the Knights Hospitalers. Much of the main building dates from the 15th century and major restoration was undertaken in 1881. There is evidence of Nonconformist worship during the 18th century a Baptist chapel was only opened in the village in 1904.

== Education ==
Primary school education is provided by St Bartholomew's Church of England Primary School.

== Notable people ==
- James Osborne VC (13 April 1857, Wigginton – 1 February 1928, Wigginton) agricultural labourer at the Champneys country house and estate, Private and recipient of the Victoria Cross during First Boer War. Osborne was buried with full military honours alongside his wife, Rhoda Osborne (née Collier; 1860–1925), at St Bartholomew’s Church, Wigginton. In 2019, in honour of Osborne a stained glass pulpit window by Thomas Denny was installed at St Bartholomew’s Church.
