= Harry Benjamin (naturopath) =

British naturopath and theosophist

Harry Benjamin (1896–1966) was a British naturopath and theosophist.

== Career ==
Benjamin studied under naturopath Harry Clements and was on the editorial staff of the Health for All magazine. He was a member of the British Naturopathic Association. His most popular book Everybody's Guide to Nature Cure went through thirteen editions and by 1958 there were 53,000 copies in print. It was dedicated to naturopath Stanley Lief.

Benjamin practiced as a naturopath in Worthing. He wrote about the principles of "nature cure", being that the body is always striving for the good of the individual and that the body contains within itself the power to bring about a return of health to the individual if the right methods are employed. He stated that the power to cure disease can only come from within the body itself, not from any doctor. Benjamin promoted the idea of toxemia. He argued against the use of herbalism in naturopathy, commenting that external remedies cannot cure disease only the body can. He commented that ""the genuine Naturopath does not make use of herbalism in his work".

Benjamin was a germ theory denialist. He wrote that germs are "superficial helpers brought there by nature to rid the body disease" and that internal "bodily filth" is the cause of disease, not germs.

His 1961 book Basic Self-Knowledge is based on George Gurdjieff's system of esoteric development.

== Personal life ==
Benjamin became a vegetarian in 1926. He married theosophist Elsie Savage, secretary of Katherine Tingley in 1943. Benjamin and Elsie were members of the Theosophical Society. He served as president. He founded a Fellows Lodge of Theosophists in Worthing.

== Selected publications ==
- Better Sight Without Glasses (1929)
- Your Diet in Health and Disease (1931)
- Everybody's Guide to Nature Cure (1936)
- Adventure in Living: The Autobiography of a Myope (1950)
- Commonsense Vegetarianism (1950)
- Basic Self-Knowledge: An Introduction to Esoteric Psychology (1961)
- Everyone's Guide to Theosophy (1969)
