= St Botolph's Church, Quarrington =

Church in Quarrington, Lincolnshire, England

Coordinates: 52°59′14″N 0°25′52″W

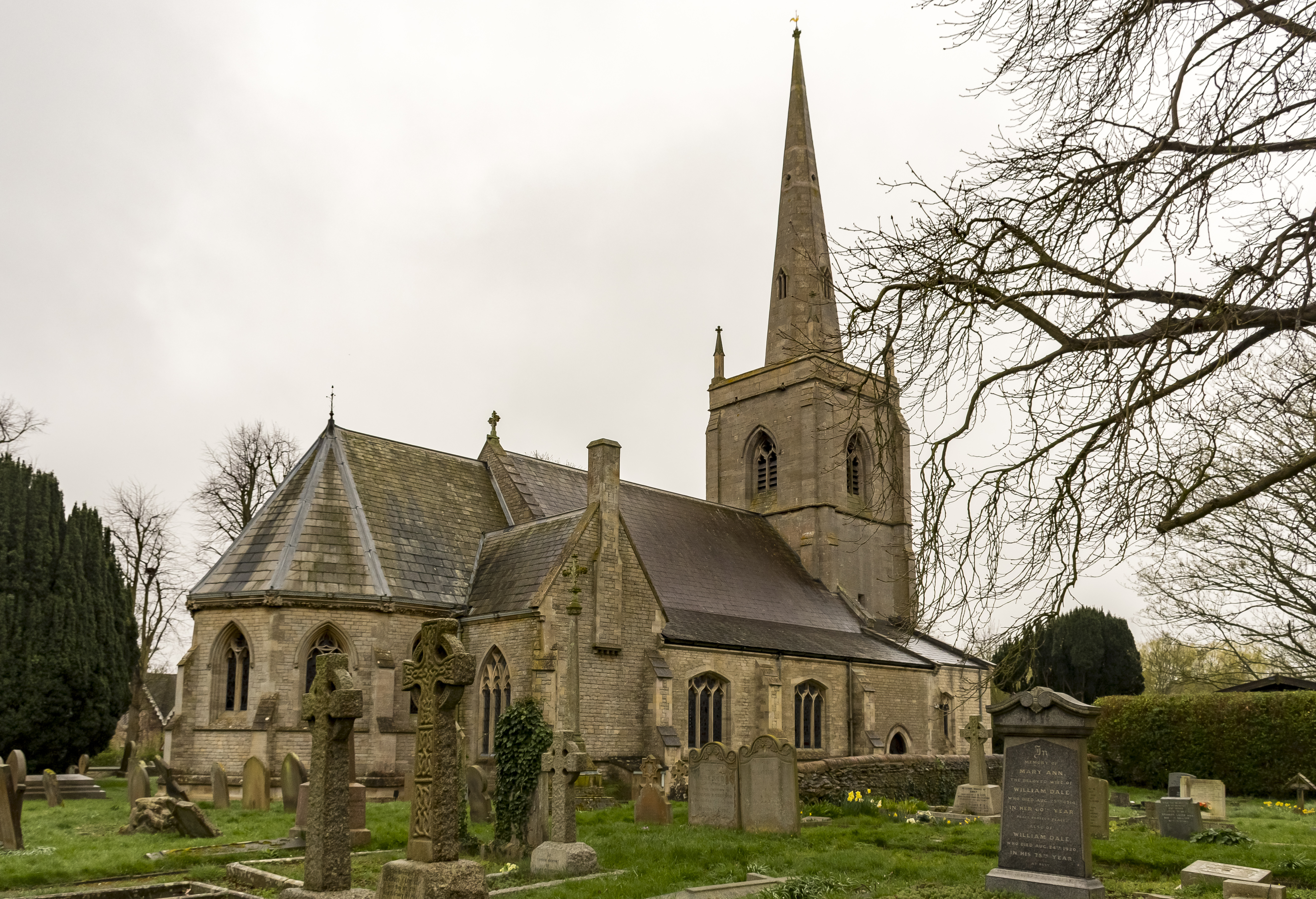
- St Botolph's Church, Quarrington
- OS grid reference: TF 05411 44468
- Country: England
- Denomination: Church of England

History
- Dedication: St Botolph

Administration
- Province: Canterbury
- Diocese: Lincoln
- Deanery: Lafford
- Parish: Quarrington with Old Sleaford

Clergy
- Rector: The Rev. M. S. Thomson

St Botolph's Church is an Anglican church in Quarrington in Lincolnshire, England.

The area has been settled since at least the Anglo-Saxon period, and a church existed at Quarrington by the time the Domesday Book was compiled in 1086, when it formed part of Ramsey Abbey's fee. It was granted to Haverholme Priory in 1165, and the Abbey claimed the right to present the rector in the 13th century. It was then taken ownership of by the Bishop of Lincoln during the English Reformation in the early 16th century, and then passed to Robert Carre and his descendants after Carre acquired a manor at Quarrington.

With capacity for 124 people, the church serves the ecclesiastic parish of Quarrington with Old Sleaford. Recognised for its age and tracery, the church has been designated a grade II* listed building. It has a tower and spire with a nave and north aisle ending at a chancel at the east end. The oldest parts of the building date to the 13th century, although substantial rebuilding took place over the following century. Renovations followed, and the local architect Charles Kirk the Younger carried out restoration work in 1862–1863, when he added the chancel in his parents' memory. The high interior's three bays of arcading correspond to the three windows in the nave's south wall and the north aisle wall; those on the south wall are unusual for the hexagons and trefoils in the reticulated designs.

== Description ==
=== Location, services and facilities ===
St Botolph's Church is the parish church of the benefice of Quarrington with Old Sleaford, which encompasses most of the village of Quarrington in the English non-metropolitan county of Lincolnshire. The benefice is a rectory and falls within the deanery of Lafford and the archdeaconry and diocese of Lincoln; the priest-in-charge is the Reverend Mark Stephen Thomson, who took over from the Reverend Sandra Rhys Benham in 2016. Dedicated to St Botolph, the church is on Town Road. The rectory was constructed in about 2000 and has a study area used as the parish office.

In addition to 20 spaces in the choir stalls, the nave and aisle pews can comfortably seat 124 adults and "149 at a pinch"; as of 2009, the average congregation size for the main Sunday service was 50, about half of whom were retired and 1 to 3 were under 16. In 2004, a log cabin-style building was constructed by Pinelog Ltd using funds from the Parochial Church Council. It serves as a robing space for choristers and can be used as a meeting room for up to 30 people. Equipped with accessible toilet facilities, the building also serves as a Sunday school.

=== Architecture and fittings ===
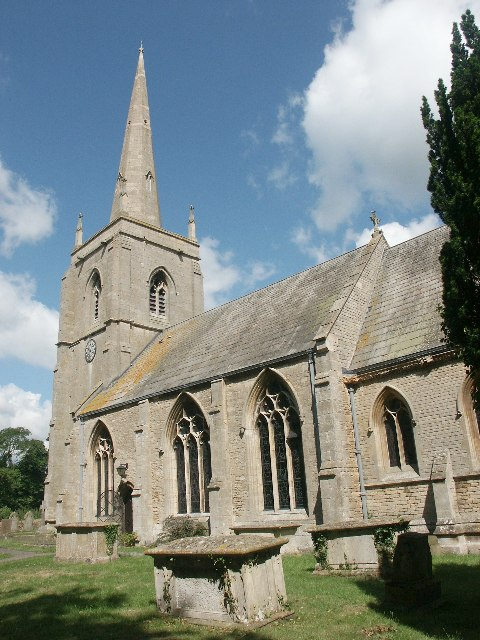
The spire

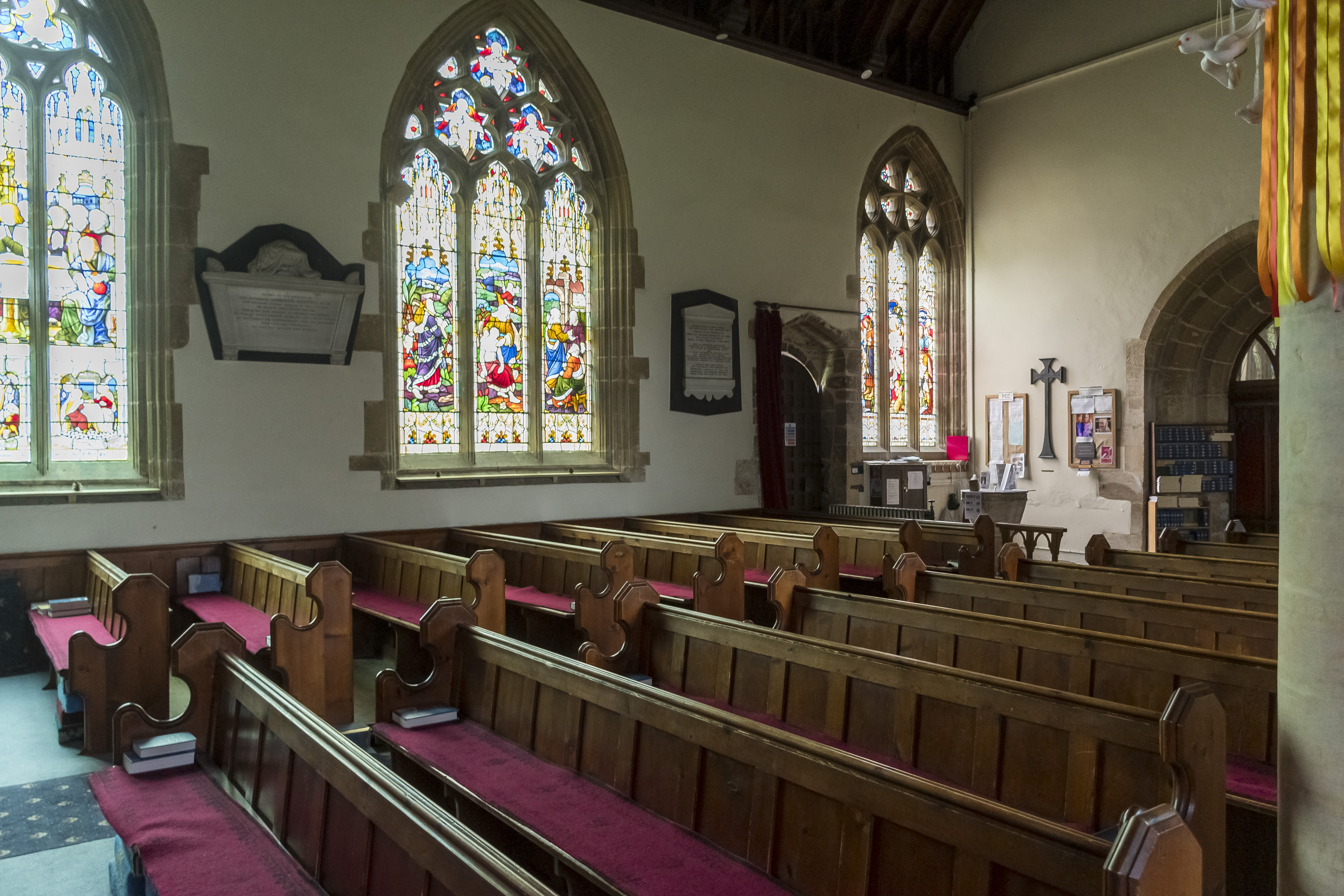
The interior of St Botolph's Church

St Botolph's Church has a west tower adjoining a nave with a north aisle; at the end of the nave is a chancel with a chapel on the north side. Owing to its age, the "excellent" tracery and a "very good" 14th-century door, the church has been listed at grade II* on the Statutory List of Buildings of Special Architectural or Historic Interest in the United Kingdom since 1949, recognising it as "particularly important ... of more than special interest".

Incorporating a window and two light openings for the bell, the tower and its spire have been dated to the mid-14th century, although its pinnacles were replaced in 1887. The antiquarian Edward Trollope did not like the spire's design, saying that it "looks as if it had slipped down". Built in a Decorated Gothic style, the tower joins to the nave with a triple-chamfered arch.

The nave has been heavily restored and contains elements from a range of periods. The architectural historian Sir Nikolaus Pevsner refers to the south wall as "puzzling" because of the tracery—it is unclear what is "Victorian fancy" and what is "correct restoration". The wall itself is 14th-century (Pevsner suggests about 1300) and incorporates a priest's doorway with mouldings, capitals and a bust of a man; the windows to its east have been restored, but follow a 14th-century reticulated style, although unusually they feature hexagons with pointed trefoils: "the oddest patterns", as Pevsner puts it. The north aisle is from the 13th century, although a 12th-century doorway sits between its late-14th-century windows. At the eastern end of the nave is the chancel, which has a polygonal (quinquangular) apse and was constructed between 1862 and 1863 by Charles Kirk the Younger in memory of his parents, the elder Charles Kirk and his wife Elizabeth. Its windows were made by Ward and Hughes.

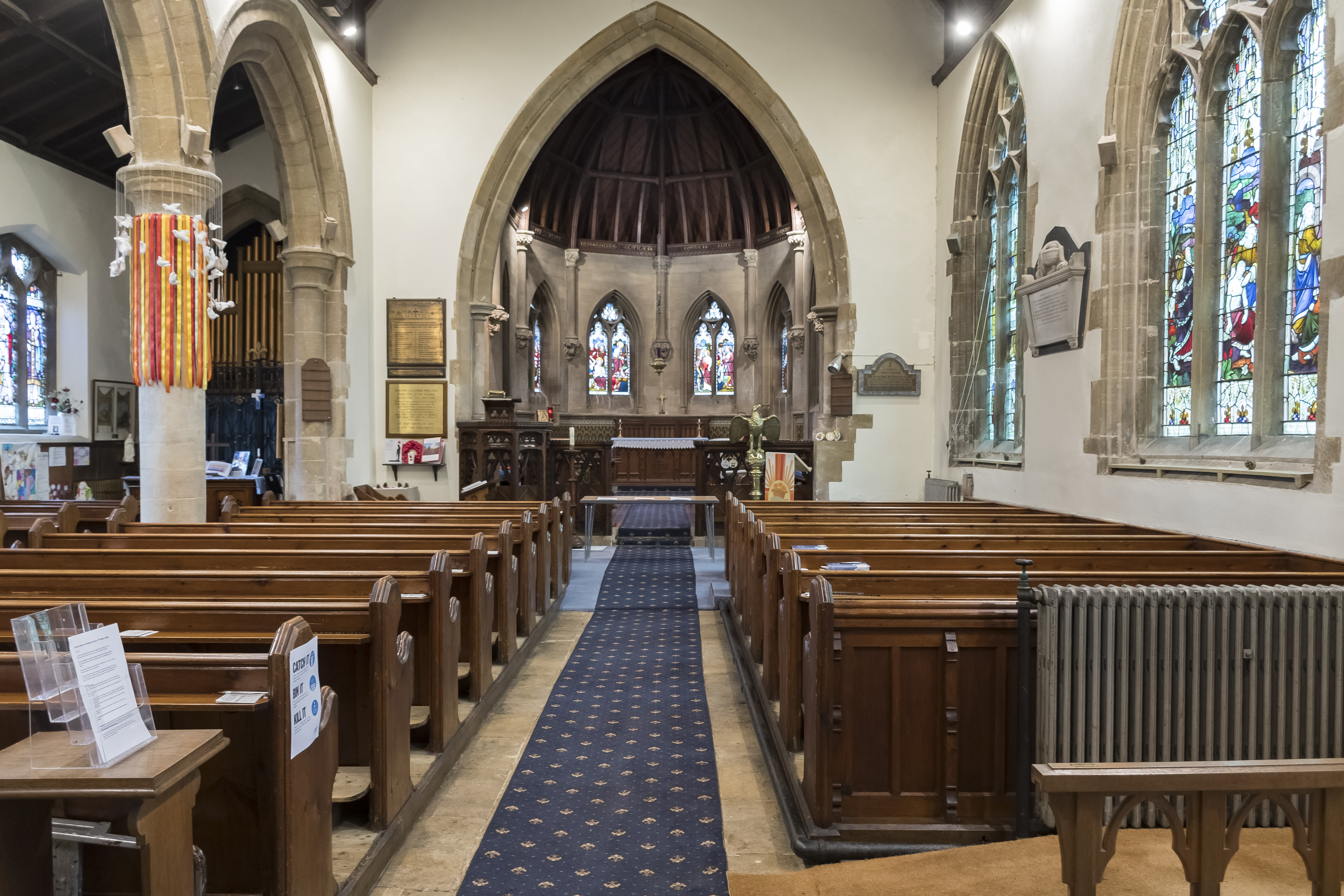
The nave, looking towards the chancel and the pulpit

Both Pevsner and Historic England regard the interior as high, relative to the Church's small size. The nave has arcading across three bays with chamfered arches and capitals; the arcades on the north side are Early English and, dating to the 13th century, are the earliest visible parts of the church. Historic England suggest that this nave was likely added to an earlier, now-lost nave. The westernmost arch is wider and shorter than the rest, giving what Trollope called "a very awkward appearance". The chancel arch follows a 13th-century style, although it was built with the 1862–63 work. Inside the chancel, shafts with floral capitals adorn the walls, while the tiled flooring and painted roof give it a "rich" appearance. The nave includes 19th- and 20th-century windows by H. Hughes (1877) and Burlison and Grylls, while another (dated 1917) commemorates the Barrett family. Morris and Co. worked on a window in the north aisle in 1935.

The church's fixtures include a 19th-century pulpit and choir stalls, and a chancel screen in a Decorated style; a font from the 14th century has foliage designs on the bowl, but lacks a base. The earliest record of an organ at St Botolph's is from 1867, when one was opened for the chancel by Bevington; it has since been moved to Pointon. In 1915, the church paid for an organ bought from N. E. Snow to be fixed by Cousans at the cost of £130. The present organ, however, was built in 1929 by J. J. Binns and has two manuals and a pedalboard.

Some of the memorials in St Botolph's date to the 18th and 19th centuries, although a plaque commemorating one Thomas Appleby dates to 1683, and several other 17th-century tablets were noted by Gervase Holles. A tablet to Romaine Hervey (d. 1837) by J. J. Saunders is inside the church; elsewhere in the grounds are tombstones belonging to the Sharpe and Kirk families and markers to the Shannons, including the artist Charles Haslewood Shannon (d. 1937), whose father, Rev. Frederick William Shannon, was rector of Quarrington and Old Sleaford from 1861 to 1910. The churchyard contains the Commonwealth war graves of four British Army soldiers of the First World War and four Royal Air Force airmen of the Second World War.

== History ==
=== Background, origins and advowson ===
Ramsey Abbey possessed a manor at Quarrington from about 1051 which, by the time Domesday was compiled, included two churches. The antiquarian James Creasey suggested that the missing church was All Saints' in Old Sleaford, where the Abbey held a manor as sokeland of Quarrington, while Trollope thought it had been lost, buried "probably in a farm yard now occupied by Mrs. Cubley". In 1909, two amateur local historians, H. Greenval and F. Cenlices, reckoned that both churches were lost and had stood on land marked by stone crosses near Tellgate on the Sleaford–Folkingham road and on Stump Cross Hill. However, in 1979, the local historians Christine Mahany and David Roffe reassessed the Domesday evidence and, after analysing the manorial structure, documentary evidence and the history of the advowson of All Saints', concluded that it was the second church in the Abbey's manor of Quarrington, and that the other church was St Botolph's or a predecessor.

Henry Selvein, a knight, held Quarrington of the Abbey and in about 1165 granted it to Haverholme Priory, who presented Alexander de Brauncewell as rector in 1218. The priory are known to have presented rectors in 1248 and 1269 as well. The Bishop of Lincoln, who had held a manor at Quarrington since Domesday, claimed the right to present its rector in the early 16th century. Bishop Holbeach alienated the manor to the Crown in 1547, and it was eventually purchased by the Sleaford merchant Robert Carre, but the Bishop still tried to present the rector; Carre protested, and the dispute was settled when Lord Chief Justice Coke ruled that Carre would present in future.

=== Construction and later history ===
A slender chancel arch existed until the mid-19th century and might have been pre-Conquest, but the earliest visible extant part of the church is the 13th-century north arcade, which may have been added to an earlier, now-lost, nave. The spire and tower date to the middle of the next century, roughly when the nave was rebuilt. Many of the windows are reticulated in a fashion popular during the early 14th century. Several medieval bequests are known: Olivia, wife of John Rossen of Quarrington, left 12 pence to the rector and church each in 1412; a donation of wool was made by another parishioner, Joan, wife of William Ward, around the same time. Later, 8 pence was left to the churchwardens by an unknown resident.

In the latter half of the 16th century, the living of Old Sleaford became "extremely poor" and its church probably fell out of use. Some time afterwards, the rector of Quarrington obtained a presentation to Old Sleaford, but, discovering the lack of tithes, he left. Robert Carre convinced him to take in the parishioners of Old Sleaford at Quarrington in return for a yearly payment; as of 2015, the parishes are still combined. Amendments to the fabric of the church were made in the early modern period, beginning when the chancel was rebuilt on a smaller scale some time after the Reformation and inset with 12th- and 13th-century stonework, the whole thing described as "very miserable" by Edward Trollope. This was replaced in 1812 by a Georgian-style chancel, constructed under the guidance of the rector, Charles James Blomfield. The North Aisle was rebuilt in 1848 and a new pulpit, screen and pews were added the following year.

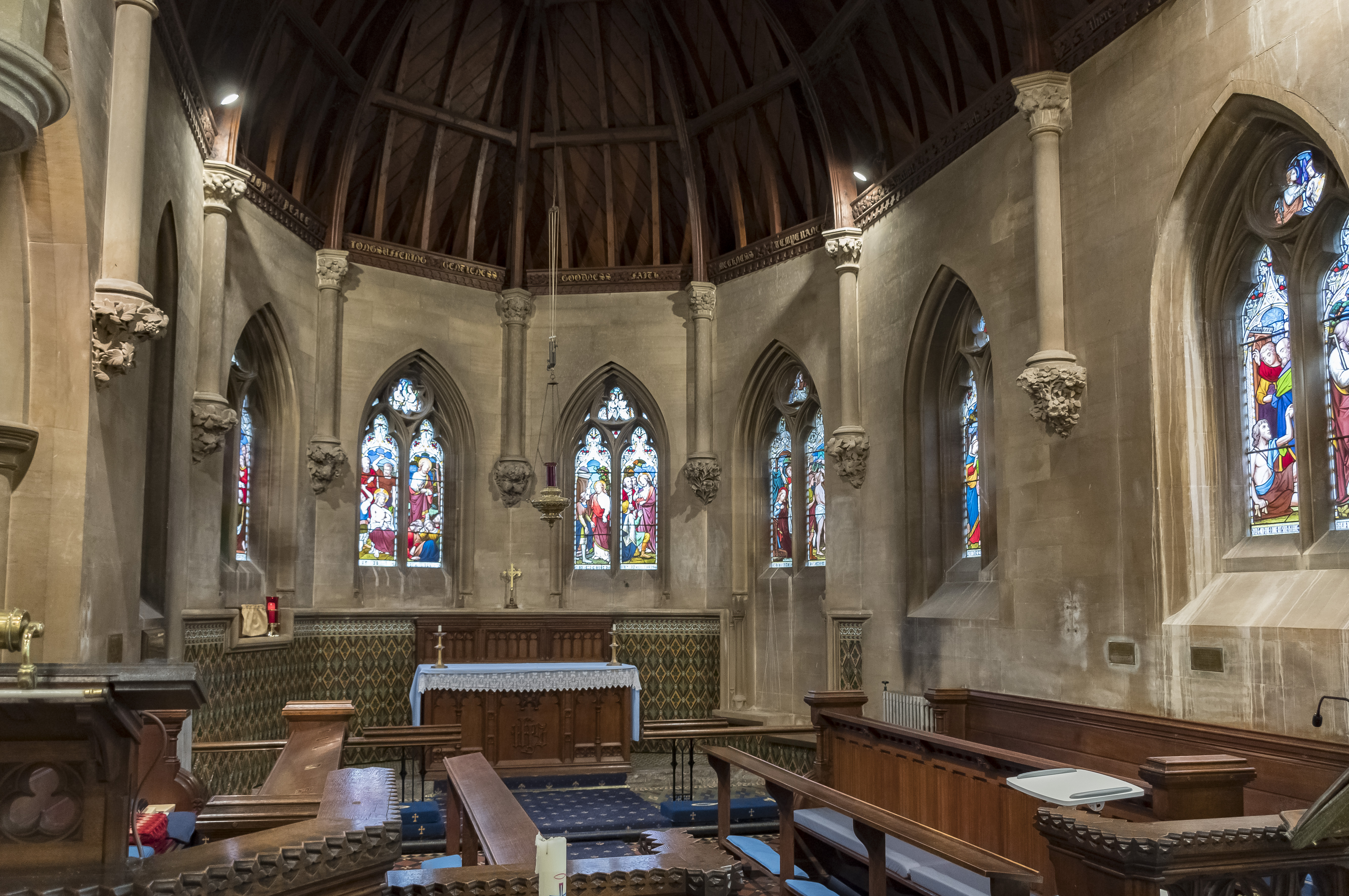
The Chancel of St Botolph's Church

The Victorian period witnessed extensive restoration work at Quarrington. Most of the nave's windows were altered, and the chancel and part of the vestry were rebuilt by Charles Kirk in 1862–63, who also widened the chancel arch. Parts of the tower and spire were remodelled 24 years later. The Census of Religious Worship (1851) reveals that the Church had room for 120 people, attendances of 20 and 40 in the morning and afternoon respectively and 20 Sunday scholars. As Sleaford expanded, houses were built along London and Station Roads, pushing the town inside the Quarrington parish boundaries in what became New Quarrington. To deal with the growing population, a second church was designed in the early 1900s on donated land in the parish, to be built closer to Sleaford. Disruption during the First World War, parish boundary changes in 1928, and rising costs delayed the plans. Instead a church hall was built in 1932 on Grantham Road and as of 2009 was being used as a community centre. An extension to the Church was added in 2001, providing a kitchen, accessible toilet and other facilities; built in matching stone, it incorporated a stained glass window from the north aisle.
