= Quarrington, Lincolnshire =

Coordinates: 52.986999°N 0.430413°W

Quarrington
- Village
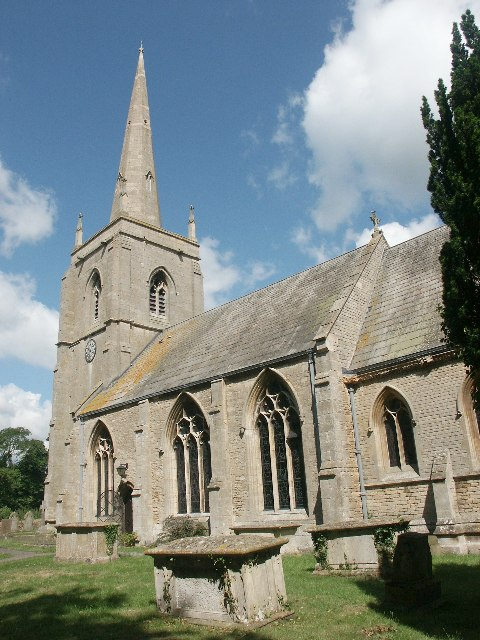
- St Botolph's Church, Quarrington

- Location within Lincolnshire
- Population: 7,046 (2011; Quarrington and Mareham census ward)
- OS grid reference: TF054444
  - London: 100 mi (160 km) S
- Civil parish: Sleaford
- District: North Kesteven
- Shire county: Lincolnshire
- Region: East Midlands
- Country: England
- Sovereign state: United Kingdom
- Post town: Sleaford
- Postcode district: NG34
- Police: Lincolnshire
- Fire: Lincolnshire
- Ambulance: East Midlands
- UK Parliament: Sleaford and North Hykeham

Quarrington is a village in the civil parish of Sleaford, in the North Kesteven district of Lincolnshire, England. The old village and its church lie approximately 1 mile (2 km) south-west of the centre of Sleaford. Suburban housing developments at New Quarrington and Quarrington Hill effectively link the two settlements. Bypassed by the A15, it is connected to Lincoln and Peterborough, as well as Newark and King's Lynn (via the A17). At the 2011 census, Quarrington and Mareham ward, which incorporates most of the settlement, had an estimated population of 7,046.

Quarrington was a rural community during the early and middle Anglo-Saxon period while mills along the River Slea in the Middle Ages gave the village its likely alternative name of Millthorpe. The Bishop of Lincoln and Ramsey Abbey held manors in Quarrington after the Norman Conquest, but the Carre family of Sleaford were the principal land-owners between 1559 and 1683, when its estate passed by marriage to the Marquesses of Bristol. Although the growth of Victorian Sleaford saw the town encroach into the parish's boundaries, the old village remained a small cluster of farm buildings and cottages for much of its history. The sale of most of the surrounding farmland by successive Marquesses of Bristol in the late 20th century led to the rapid development of residential estates on Quarrington Hill and in New Quarrington which have engulfed the original settlement. Low crime rates, affordable housing, high standards of living and access to good schools have attracted home-buyers to the area, contributing to a sharp rise in the population.

The medieval St Botolph's Church, a grade II* listed building, lies at the heart of the old village and remains a hub for the Anglican community. The village's primary school serves local children, who continue their secondary education in one of Sleaford's three secondary schools. The nearest railway station on the Grantham to Skegness and Peterborough to Lincoln lines is in Sleaford. In the 19th century, the most common employment was in agriculture and more than half of the village's population were farm labourers. By 2011, most residents were employed in the wholesale and retail trades, public administration and defence, human health and social work, and manufacturing.

== History ==
=== Early ===
Scattered Palaeolithic and Bronze Age materials have been discovered in and around Quarrington but while nearby Old Sleaford is known to have been settled in the Iron Age and occupied by the Romans, there is little evidence for sustained pre-Saxon settlement at Quarrington.

=== Medieval ===
Between 1992 and 1995, archaeologists evaluating 34 trenches across 13 hectares of land around the village uncovered 56 ditches or gullies, a number of postholes, a large collection of pottery sherds and "extremely rare" evidence of metalworking from the 6th–7th centuries. The site has been dated to the 5th–9th centuries, representing an early and middle Anglo-Saxon settlement. Although noted for its metalworking and its size, the archaeologists concluded that it "displayed all the signs of a typical rural community", reflecting how "the vast majority" of the Anglo-Saxon population lived. Analysis of animal bones revealed that sheep-farming increasingly replaced pig-rearing at the site during this period. The pottery found at the site suggests that Quarrington had a strong, southern trade network; in the early Anglo-Saxon period this network encompassed Lincolnshire and Leicestershire, while pottery from Northamptonshire was prevalent in the middle Saxon period. A small early Anglo-Saxon cemetery containing inhumations was uncovered in the parish in 2000.

Quarrington's medieval name was recorded in the Domesday Book (1086) as Corninctune or Cornunctone, from the Old English cweorn ("mill") and tun ("homestead"), meaning "miller's homestead", reflecting the importance of the watermills which were built along the River Slea. Bardi, one of the pre-conquest landowners at Quarrington, had owned 10 mills in Sleaford and Quarrington in 1066, and the 11 or 12 in existence by 1086 represents the largest cluster of mills in Lincolnshire. The archaeologists and historians Christine Mahany and David Roffe suggest that Quarrington was a specialised part of Bardi's compact estate, geared in particular to milling. The historian John Blair has speculated that this specialised function may have been associated with an earlier monastic estate centred on Sleaford, also suggested by the grid-aligned 7th- and 8th-century ditches uncovered at Quarrington during the 1990s excavations and by evidence of later grain-processing at Sleaford.

Ramsey Abbey was granted a manor in Quarrington by Jol of Lincoln, a monk, in c. 1051. The Domesday Book of 1086 recorded the abbey's manor consisted of one carucate and six bovates and had two churches. Mahany and Roffe concluded that one of the churches was probably at Old Sleaford, where the abbey held a manor as sokeland of Quarrington. Bardi's manor in Quarrington had been granted to the Bishop of Lincoln by 1086 and consisted of nine carucates and two and a half bovates plus 60 acres of meadow and two mills. (Note: The Bishop's tenants included Osmund and Hugh Rufus, who each held two carucates. He unsuccessfully claimed a parcel of land in the settlement held by one Archil and few small parcels were held by other men: one bovate of land in Quarrington was soke to Earl Morcar's manor at Kirkby la Thorpe, while Osgerius had five acres of meadow and half a carucate, and one Waldin Brito tried to claim 14 acres.) A separate village, Millthorpe was also recorded, but the archaeologists Fiona Walker and Tom Lane suggest this may have been an alternative name for Quarrington. Amongst the bishop's tenants was Hugh de St Vedasto or Vedeto, who held a knight's fee in c. 1200–10. His family were prominent tenants in the village; Amicia, wife of Hugh de St Vedasto, died in possession of lands and tenements there in 1253, and Alexander and William de St Vedasto are named in connection in other documents. Henry Selvein, a knight, held Quarrington of the abbey and in c. 1166 granted the lands to Haverholme Priory.

Excavations have revealed later medieval pits and pottery in the village, with ditches reflecting a predominantly agricultural use of the land. In the Lay Subsidy of 1334, Quarrington and Millthorpe were valued at £4 10s. 4 1/2d., slightly below average for its wapentake.

=== Early and later modern ===
The Bishop of Lincoln alienated his lands at Quarrington to the Crown in 1547; they passed to Edward Seymour, 1st Duke of Somerset and Lord Protector, but reverted to the Crown on his attainder for treason in 1549. Mary I granted them to Edward Clinton, 9th Baron Clinton and later Earl of Lincoln, who sold them to Robert Carre of Sleaford in 1559. Carre acquired numerous manors, including Old and New Sleaford, during the mid-16th century and they passed through marriage from his male-line descendants to the Earls (later Marquesses) of Bristol. A 1563 diocesan return shows that 17 families lived in the village and 120 people took Holy Communion; by the early 18th century, the diocesan visitations by Edmund Gibson show the number of families had risen to 35. The local historian Edward Trollope recorded few changes in the early modern period, with the exception of a fire that burnt down the rectory in 1760; it was rebuilt in c. 1845. Two 17th-century buildings still exist: the Bristol Farmhouse and the coursed rubble Manor House, which one "widow Timberland" occupied in 1691.

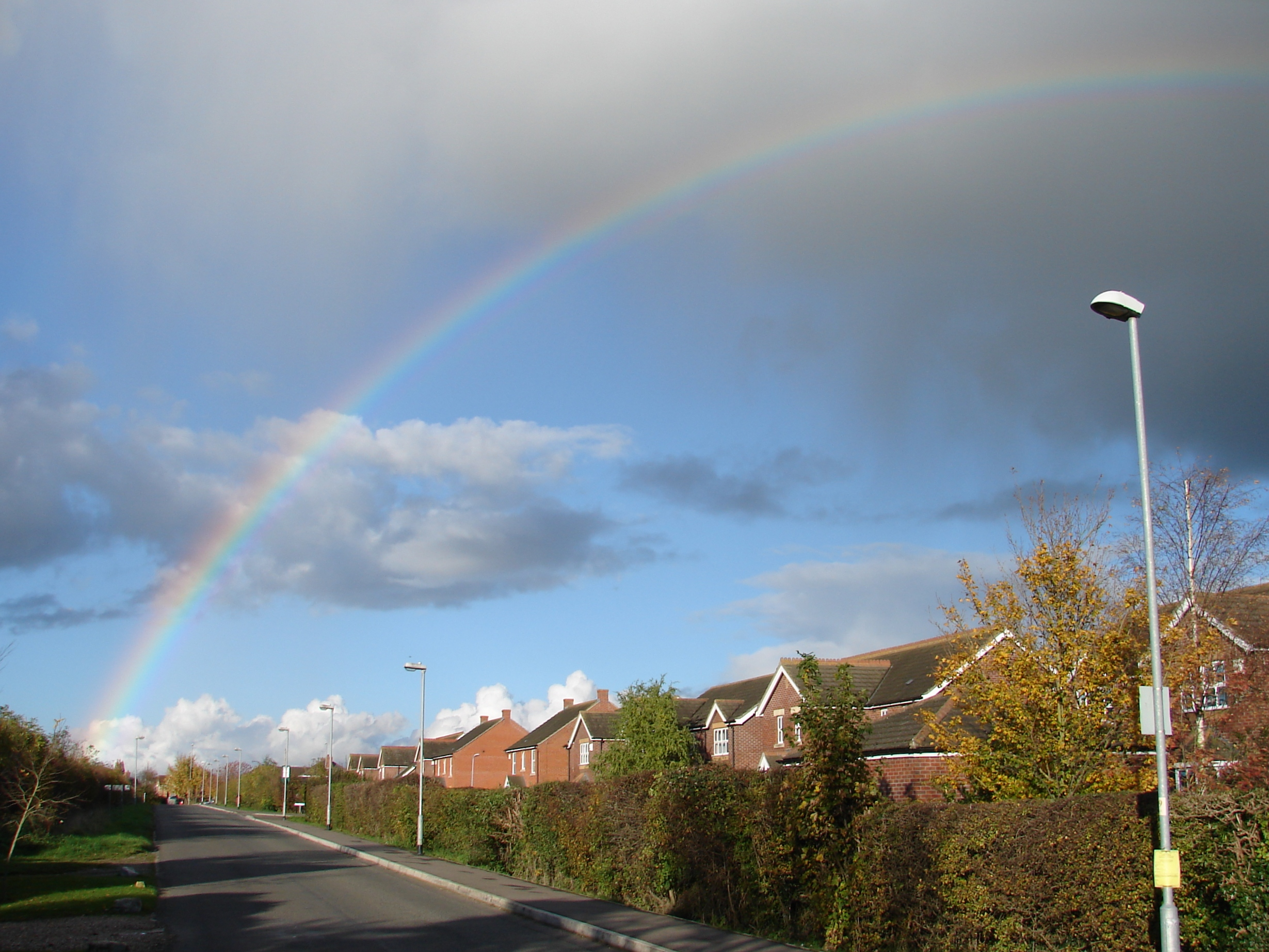
Northfield Road, 2007

The town's fields were enclosed in 1796 and a map of the village was drawn up at the same time, showing the settlement along Town Road and Townside Road with Rector Field and Earl Field to the north and north-east respectively. At the time, more than 210 acres of land were allotted to the rectory by Lord Bristol in place of the tithes it had previously been entitled to. During the mid and late-19th century, the population of the old village of Quarrington declined (from 98 in 1851 to 72 in 1871). Aside from the rectory and church, the village included two large farms and a cluster of labourers cottages around Town Road. By 1872, the parish spanned 1,620 acres and the village contained 63 houses. The same year, Trollope wrote that "the appearance of this small village, lying around its well cared for church, is very pleasing". As Sleaford expanded, houses were built along London and Station Roads, pushing the town inside the Quarrington parish boundaries in what became New Quarrington. Sanitation in the poorest parts of Sleaford worsened during the 19th century and a Local Board of Health was charged with improving living conditions. In 1879, Lord Bristol sold land on Quarrington Hill to the board, who built a pumping station to transport clean fenland water east into the town.

Most of the land remained in possession of the Marquesses of Bristol throughout the 20th century, but from the 1970s the indebted 6th Marquess and his son, the 7th Marquess, sold much of their farmland around Sleaford and Quarrington. In 1989, the Bristol Estates office in Sleaford closed. The result was a boom in housebuilding, especially in the fields around Quarrington. In the 1980s, hundreds of houses were constructed in Southfields, and developments on Quarrington Hill followed in the late 1990s. Low house prices and crime rates, and good educational facilities in Sleaford made the new homes attractive. As the local historian Simon Pawley wrote, "Quarrington ... began to look more like a suburb of Sleaford than a village in its own right". In July 2015, planning permission for a further 200 homes between Northfield Road and the A15 was granted by North Kesteven District Council.

== Geography ==
=== Topography ===
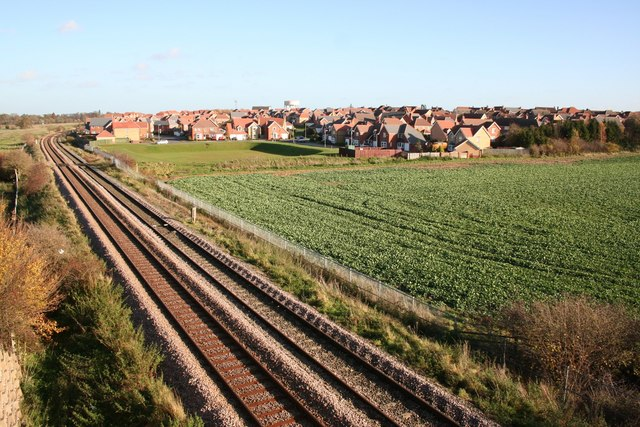
Quarrington Hill

Quarrington is a settlement south west of Sleaford, a market town in the North Kesteven district of Lincolnshire. Quarrington proper is clustered around Town Road and between Grantham Road (the B1517) and London Road. To the north of Grantham Road is Quarrington Hill and to the north and east of the old village is New Quarrington; all the settlements are linked by contiguous housing developments to form a suburb of Sleaford. Lincolnshire County Council's State of the Environment Report (1994) found that roughly three-quarters of Lincolnshire is low-lying, with much of it near sea-level; Quarrington lies between approximately 15 and 25 meters above sea level, close to Lincoln Cliff, a limestone scarp running north–south through Lindsey and Kesteven. The bedrock under most of Quarrington is Cornbrash limestone belonging to the Great Oolite Group of Jurassic rocks formed 168−165 million years ago. The soil belongs to the Quarrington series, a type of brown, calcareous sand. The county's agricultural land is generally of "very good" quality; as a result, intensive arable and vegetable farming is predominant while pastoral farming declined in the 20th century. Quarrington and Sleaford are on the edge of the Fens, a low-lying region of the East of England which, before drainage from the 17th to the 20th centuries, was marshy and liable to flooding. Draining has revealed nutrient-rich soils and enabled 88% of the land to be cultivated, especially for arable farming, and most of it is graded amongst the most productive farmland in the country.

=== Climate ===
According to the Köppen classification, the British Isles experience a maritime climate characterised by relatively cool summers and mild winters. Lincolnshire's position on the east of the Isles allows for a sunnier and warmer climate relative to the national average, and it is one of the driest counties in the United Kingdom. Although it may vary depending on altitude and proximity to the coast, the mean average temperature for the East of England is approximately 9 °C to 10.5 °C; the highest temperature recorded in the region was 40.3 °C at Coningsby, Lincolnshire on 19 July 2022. On average, the region experiences 30 days of rainfall in winter and 25 in summer, with 15 days of thunder and 6–8 days of hail per year; on 25 August 2001, hail the size of golf balls were reported in Sleaford and other parts of central Lincolnshire. Wind tends to affect the north and west of the country more than the East, and Lincolnshire tends to receive no more than 2 days of gale per year (where gale is a gust of wind at >34 knots, sustained for at least 10 minutes). Despite this, tornadoes form more often in the East of England than elsewhere in the country; Sleaford experienced tornadoes in 2006 and 2012, both of which caused damage to property.

Climate data for Cranwell 1981–2010 62 m asl (weather station 3.5 miles (6 km) to the NW of Sleaford)
Month	Jan	Feb	Mar	Apr	May	Jun	Jul	Aug	Sep	Oct	Nov	Dec	Year
Mean daily maximum °C (°F)	6.7 (44.1)	7.2 (45.0)	10.1 (50.2)	12.7 (54.9)	16.1 (61.0)	19.0 (66.2)	21.8 (71.2)	21.5 (70.7)	18.4 (65.1)	14.1 (57.4)	9.6 (49.3)	6.7 (44.1)	13.7 (56.7)
Mean daily minimum °C (°F)	1.0 (33.8)	0.8 (33.4)	2.5 (36.5)	4.1 (39.4)	6.9 (44.4)	9.8 (49.6)	12.0 (53.6)	12.0 (53.6)	9.9 (49.8)	6.9 (44.4)	3.6 (38.5)	1.4 (34.5)	5.9 (42.6)
Average precipitation mm (inches)	50.9 (2.00)	36.3 (1.43)	41.6 (1.64)	47.3 (1.86)	50.1 (1.97)	56.6 (2.23)	54.0 (2.13)	58.1 (2.29)	51.9 (2.04)	58.0 (2.28)	53.9 (2.12)	49.9 (1.96)	608.6 (23.96)
Mean monthly sunshine hours	64.1	81.3	115.4	153.5	200.7	187.0	200.3	187.5	147.9	117.0	72.8	59.6	1,587.1
Source: "Sleaford Climate". Met Office.

== Government and politics ==
Before 1832, Quarrington was in the Lincolnshire parliamentary constituency, which encompassed all the county except for four boroughs. In the 1818 election, 49 of the 2,000 people living in New and Old Sleaford and Quarrington qualified to vote. In 1832, the Reform Act widened the franchise and divided Lincolnshire. Quarrington was in the South Lincolnshire constituency that elected two members to parliament. The franchise was widened by the reforms so that roughly 15% (202) of males in Sleaford and Quarrington could vote in 1868. The constituency was abolished in 1885 and Quarrington was in the new North Kesteven constituency. It merged with the Grantham seat in 1918. In 1997, Quarrington was reorganised into Sleaford and North Hykeham.

The member returned in 2010 for Sleaford and North Hykeham was the Conservative candidate Stephen Phillips, who replaced Douglas Hogg. Lincolnshire elected a Member of the European Parliament from 1974 until 1994, and then became part of the Lincolnshire and Humberside South constituency until 1999; since then, it has elected members as part of the East Midlands constituency; from 1999, there were six members for the East Midlands, but the number was reduced to five from 2009 until Brexit in 2020.

The ancient parish of Quarrington lay within Kesteven's Aswardhurn wapentake. It was incorporated into Sleaford Poor Law Union in 1851. The Public Health Act 1872 established urban sanitary districts (USD) and Quarrington became part of the Sleaford USD, which in turn was reorganised into Sleaford Urban District (UD) by the Local Government Act 1894. Sleaford UD was abolished by the Local Government Act 1972 and, by statutory instrument, Sleaford civil parish became its successor, thus merging Quarrington, New Sleaford, Old Sleaford and Holdingham civil parishes on 1 April 1974. Subsequently, it has been served by Sleaford Town Council, North Kesteven District Council and Lincolnshire County Council.

== Economy ==
In 1831, more than 60% of Quarrington's adult males worked in agriculture and more than a quarter were employed in retail and handicraft industries; more than half were labourers and slightly more than a quarter were characterised as "middle sorts". Sleaford had a weekly market throughout the 19th century and a livestock market on Northgate from 1874 until 1984. At the 2011 census, the largest socio-economic grouping in the census's Quarrington and Mareham ward is workers in lower-tier managerial or administrative roles (25.9%), followed by intermediate (14.7%), semi-routine (14.6%) and higher managerial (10.9%) occupations; no other group comprised 10% or more. In terms of industry, the most common, based on those working in the sector, are wholesale and retail trade (including automotive repairs) at 15.5%, public administration and defence (15.4%), human health and social work (14.3%) and manufacturing (10.0%), with no other groups representing 10% or more. The largest group of working-age persons by economic activity are those in full-time employment, who make up 47.5% of this section of the population while 15.4% are part-time employees and 7.7% are self-employed; 13.7% of the working-age population are retired. 2.9% were unemployed, with approximately 38.0% of those in long-term unemployment and roughly 27.5% aged 16 to 24. An unemployment survey of Lincolnshire in 2014 found that the county experienced a decline in unemployment (based on Jobseekers Allowance claimants) by 29% over the preceding 12 months, while the county's unemployment rate was marginally below the national average.

== Demographics ==
Historic Population
Year	Ancient/Civil Parish
1801	101
1811	109
1821	132
1831	184
1841	236
1851	264
1881	365
1891	454
1901	865
1911	1,649
1921	1,709
1931	2,044
1951	1,935
Abolished in 1974

In 1951, the parish had a population of 1,935. At the 2011 Census, Sleaford Quarrington and Mareham ward had an estimated total population of 7,046, which accounts for roughly 6.5% of the total population of North Kesteven. After Quarrington civil parish was abolished in 1974, the population statistics for the new Sleaford parish which absorbed it were divided into four wards, which did not necessarily correspond to the former boundaries of Quarrington CP. (Note: The statistics for Sleaford were recorded as follows: Census of the United Kingdom. 1971. Data accessed via Casweb (UK Data Service: Census Support). Based on population totals for Sleaford North (2,123), East (1,494), West (2,039) and South (2,322) Wards.; Census of the United Kingdom. 1981. Data accessed via Casweb (UK Data Service: Census Support). Based on population totals for Sleaford North (2,606), East (1,781), West (1,983) and South (2,133) Wards.; Census of the United Kingdom. 1991. Data accessed via Casweb (UK Data Service: Census Support). Based on population totals for Sleaford North (2,732), East (1,794), West (2,111) and South (3,357) Wards.) The town's population (including Quarrington) grew by 39% between 1991 and 2001, the fastest growth rate of any town in Lincolnshire; this has been attributed in part to the developments around Quarrington since the 1980s and a joint planning strategy report found that "This growth has largely been the result of people moving to the area attracted by the quality of life, low crime rates, relatively low house prices and good-quality education." The district population is predicted to rise by a further 29% between 2008 and 2033, compared with a national average of 18%; in 2013, county councillors approved plans to build 4,500 new homes.

The 2011 Census revealed that approximately 94.3% of Quarrington and Mareham ward's resident population were White British; the second largest ethnic group was White (other) at 3.0%, then Asian (including Asian British) at 0.7%, followed by White Irish at approximately 0.6%, Black, Afro-Caribbean and Black British at 0.2% and Arab at 0.1%; no other ethnic group represented 1% or more of the population. 88.0% of residents were born in England and 4.9% in other parts of the United Kingdom; 4.0% were from EU countries, with 2.0% coming from EU member states which joined after March 2001. Most people in the Quarrington and Mareham ward identified as Christian. 72.5% of the residents stated they were Christian and 26.5% registered as "no religion" or chose not to state any; no other group constituted more than 1% of the population.

Between December 2013 and November 2014, 1,289 criminal acts were reported in the policing neighbourhood of Sleaford Town (which includes Quarrington), of which 43.9% were classed as anti-social behaviour, making it the largest portion of reported crimes. In 2010, recorded crime levels were amongst the lowest in the country and, for the year ending June 2014, the crime rate in the North Kesteven district is the lowest in Lincolnshire at 24.38 crimes per thousand residents.

== Religion ==
In the 17th century, the rectory of Quarrington and the vicarage of Old Sleaford combined to form the ecclesiastical parish of Quarrington with Old Sleaford. The parish boundaries of Quarrington with Old Sleaford were last altered in 1928. The rectory is in the Diocese and Archdeaconry of Lincoln and has been in the Lafford Rural Deanery since 1968. The priest-in-charge is the Reverend Mark Stephen Thomson, who took over from the Reverend Sandra Rhys Benham in 2016. The patrons are alternatively the Bishop of Lincoln and Sir Lyonel Tollemache, 7th Baronet.

The grade II* listed St Botolph's Church serves Quarrington's Anglican community. Its 13th-century north arcade is the oldest part of the church. The tower and spire date to the following century and St Botolph's listing reflects the "excellent" 14th century tracery in two of its windows. The chancel was rebuilt when Charles Kirk restored the church in 1862−3 and an extension was completed in 2001. The church had 120 sittings at the Census of Religious Worship in 1851; there were 20 morning attendees, 40 who came to the church in the afternoon and 20 Sunday scholars. As of 2015, family services are held on the first Sunday of the month at 11:00am and Holy Communion is carried out every second, third and fourth Sunday at 11:00am and every Wednesday at 10:00am. In the early 1900s a second church was designed to be built on donated land in the parish but closer to Sleaford. Disruption during World War I, parish boundary changes in 1928 and rising costs delayed the plans. Instead, a church hall was built in 1932 on Grantham Road and is now used as a community centre. The current rectory was constructed c. 2000 and a curate's house of a similar age was being rented by the Church of England in 2009.

== Transport ==
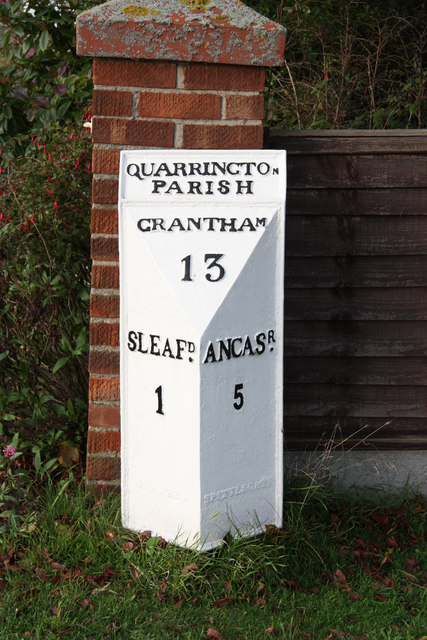
Milestone displaying the distance from Quarrington to Grantham, Sleaford and Ancaster

Holdingham roundabout connects the A17 to the A15 road from Peterborough to Scawby. The A15 passed through Quarrington and Sleaford until 1993 when its bypass was completed. The main route through the village is Grantham Road (B1517) which connects the A15 to Southgate in Sleaford. London Road forks from it after the railway crossing in Sleaford and continues along the eastern edge of Quarrington to Silk Willougby and the A15.

The nearest railway stations are at Sleaford and Rauceby. The railways arrived in the 19th century when plans to build the Boston, Sleaford and Midland Counties Railway were sanctioned by Act of Parliament 1853. The line from Grantham opened in 1857; Boston was connected in 1859, Bourne in 1871 and Ruskington on Great Northern and Great Eastern Joint Railway in 1882. As of 2015, Sleaford is a stop on the Peterborough to Lincoln Line and the Poacher Line, from Grantham to Skegness; Rauceby is a stop on the Poacher line only. Grantham, roughly 14 miles (23 km) away by road and two stops from Sleaford (and one from Rauceby) on the Poacher Line, is a major stop on the East Coast Main Line. Trains from Grantham to London King's Cross take approximately 1 hour 15 minutes.

== Education ==
The 1833 House of Commons enquiry into education in England found that Quarrington had no schools and still had none in the 1860s when New Quarrington was emerging. The lack of school and an accessible church became a cause for concern. The Marquess of Bristol gave an acre of land on the western edge of New Quarrington, between London and Grantham Roads, on which to build a school. Sleaford architect Charles Kirk constructed the school and master's house at his own expense in 1867 for "to provide a place where the adults and children only of the labouring and other poorer classes of Quarrington and Old Sleaford may be instructed in the catechism and doctrine and worship of the Church of England". The school operated along the National Society's recommended lines, with two teachers and 65 pupils on roll in 1870. The school could accommodate c. 100 children and had an attached chancel. The school was extended in 1898, the 1960s and 1980s. The successor, St Botolph's Church of England School, moved out of the old premises into new accommodation in 2002. As of 2015, the school is a voluntary controlled mixed primary school admitting juniors and infants with 394 pupils on roll, and was rated "good" by Ofsted.

Sleaford is served by three secondary schools with sixth forms: Carre's Grammar School, a boys' grammar school, Kesteven and Sleaford High School, a girls' grammar school, and St George's Academy, a mixed comprehensive school. The grammar schools are selective and pupils are required to pass the Eleven plus exam. St George's is not selective. The co-educational Joint Sixth Form consortium between the three schools allows pupils to choose from subjects taught at any or all of them.

== See also ==
- Listed buildings in Sleaford, which includes the one grade II* and five grade II listed buildings in Quarrington.
