= Mary Frances Dowdall =

English writer and novelist (1876–1939)

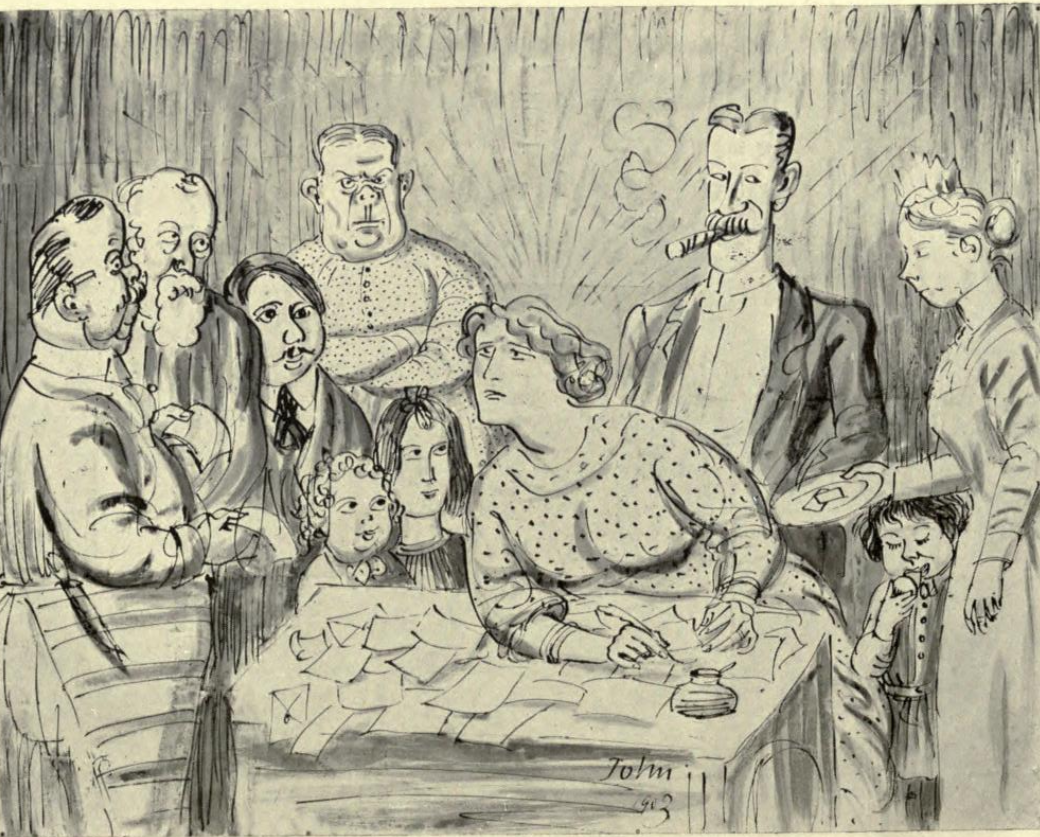
Frontispiece for Dowdall's novel The Book of Martha, by Augustus John, 1913

Mary Frances Harriet Dowdall (née Borthwick, 11 February 1876 – 1939) was an English writer of fiction and non-fiction born in London. Her four novels have been called "astutely critical" on the subject of marriage.

== Background ==
Mary Frances was the youngest of five children of Cunninghame Borthwick, a stockbroker and the 19th Lord Borthwick, (1813–1885), and his wife, Harriet Alice (née Day), from Rochester, Kent, who died in 1917. She was privately educated. The family lived in Mayfair but from 1870 also owned Ravenstone Castle at Glasserton, Wigtownshire, now Dumfries and Galloway, in Scotland. In 1897 Mary Frances married Judge Harold Chaloner Dowdall, KC (1868–1955). They had four children.

Judge Harold Dowdall was the subject of a 1909 painting by Augustus John, made at the end of his term as Lord Mayor of Liverpool. One account of the painting contains incidental information on the work and on the Dowdalls. Mary Frances Dowdall herself had her portrait painted in oils by the British lithographer and painter, Charles Hazelwood Shannon, whose surviving papers include correspondence with Harold Chaloner Dowdall and his mother and wife about the arrangements for portrait sittings and exhibitions of their portraits.

== Writings ==
Mary Frances Dowdall began her writing career with contributions to periodicals, including Time & Tide. These inspired five books of amusing non-fiction on the difficulties of housekeeping, marriage and social relations, published by Duckworth: The Book of Martha (1913), with a frontispiece by Augustus John; Joking Apart... (1914, self-illustrated); The Second Book of Martha, etc. (1923); Manners & Tone of Good Society (1926); and, Questionable Antics (1927).

In addition, Duckworth published four novels by Dowdall addressing the problems of marriage: The Kaleidoscope (1915); Susie Yesterday, To-Day, and Forever (1919) which features a young woman with suspect motives in an unhappy marriage; Three Loving Ladies (1921) which explores the lack of communication between men and women - "I have to treat what I want to say as if it were to a foreigner and had to be translated into his language." Dowdall seems to blame different gender characteristics: "He wants to preserve his own qualities; you want to preserve yours; they are wholly contradictory, and one side or the other must impose its will."; The Tactless Man (1922) which has its protagonist bargaining with her husband for treatment as a complete person, not a "wretched button-faced, bird-happy, soap-spirited fool".

Facsimiles of several of Dowdall's books are available.
