= Champneys =

Coordinates: 51.77106°N 0.63436°W

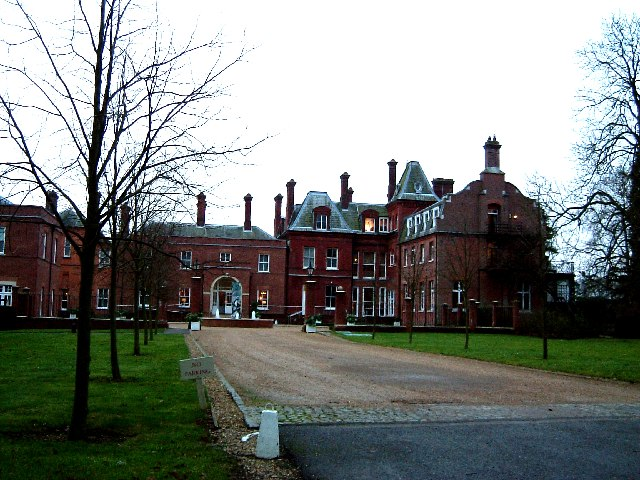

General information
- Location: Tring, Hertfordshire, United Kingdom

Champneys /ˈtʃæmpniz/ is an English country house and its associated estate near Tring, Hertfordshire. The mansion is run as a destination spa by a business using "Champneys" as the brand name for a group of spa resorts and day spas.

== History ==
The earliest record of an estate associated with the Champneys name is in 1307. It appears in the Tring manor court rolls for 1514. It was owned by successive landowning families in the Wigginton, Hertfordshire and surrounding area between the 14th and 19th centuries, although for a short period around 1535 it is recorded as owned by Thomas Cranmer, Archbishop of Canterbury.

The grounds and original house were inherited in 1871 by the Rev. Arthur Sutton Valpy. He replaced the original building by the current French Second Empire styled house built in 1874 which stood in extensive grounds. In 1900, Champneys was sold to Lady Rothschild; the family had owned nearby Tring Park Mansion since 1872.

In 1925 Stanley Lief, a pioneer in the field of naturopathy, bought Champneys, converting it into a Nature Cure resort which he ran from the 1930s for about 20 years. Champneys at Tring continued as a health resort with varying degrees of success, latterly under the ownership of a Middle Eastern consortium, until it was bought by Stephen Purdew in 2002. The house with associated buildings is set in landscaped grounds of around 200 acres (0.81 km^{2}).

== The business group ==
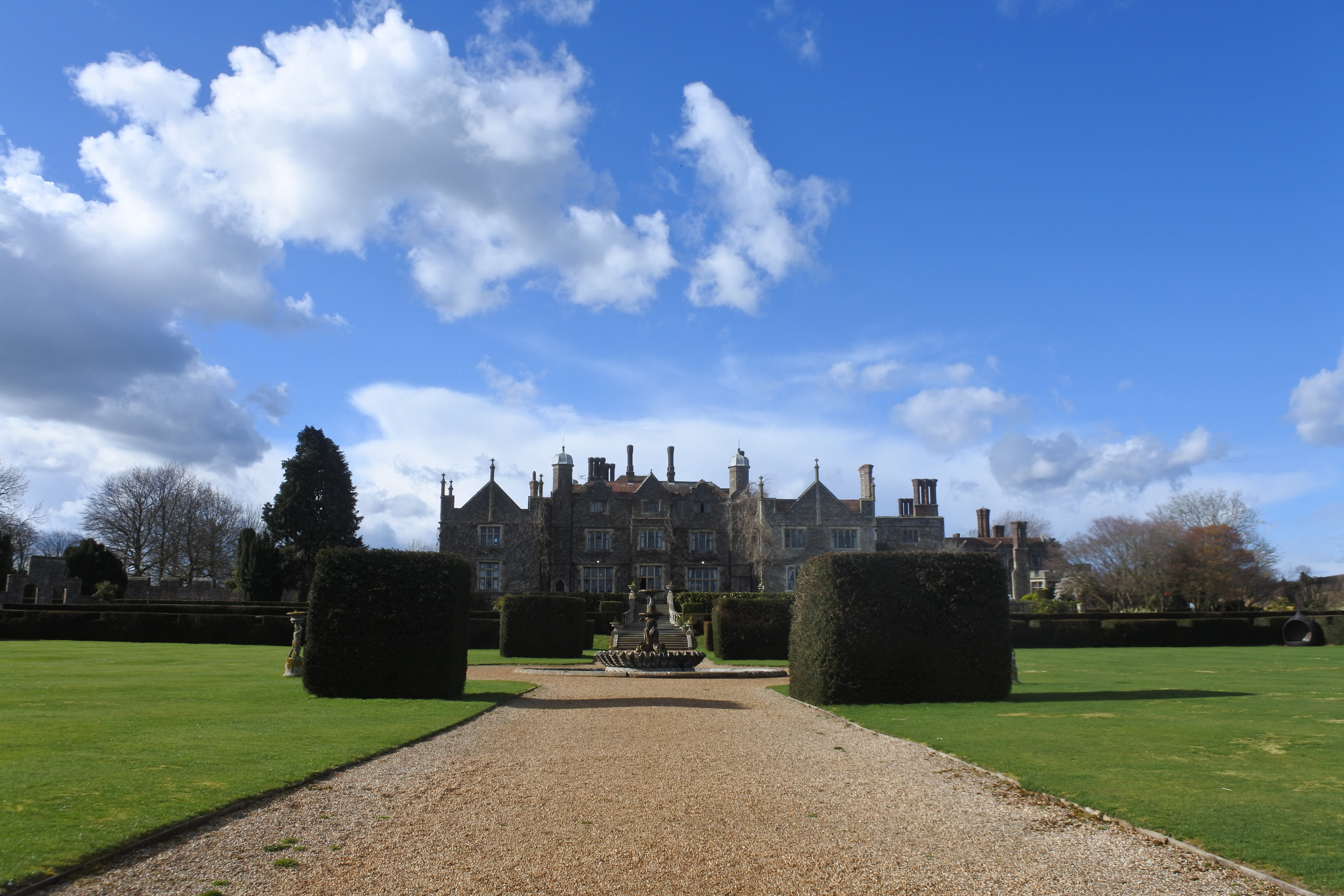
Eastwell Manor, Ashford, Kent

Champneys is the brand name of a destination spa group, comprising four spa resorts, two hotels and two day spas owned by the Purdew family. Named after the spa in Tring, Hertfordshire, which opened in 1925, the first spa in the group was in fact Henlow Grange, followed by Forest Mere near Liphook and Springs. It was only when Tring was acquired that the group of spa resorts combined under the Champneys brand name. Spa hotels were then added to the portfolio, including Eastwell Manor and Mottram Hall.

In 2004, £150,000 was raised for Breast Cancer Care, Tommy's Charity and the Disability Foundation were supported in 2006, raising a combined sum of £100,000. The Champneys Charitable Foundation was registered with the Charity Commission on 31 May 2006.

In July 2011, Sir Paul Stephenson, Metropolitan Police Commissioner, resigned over a stay at Champneys Tring, part of which had been a gift from Stephen Purdew, and in an interview in The Guardian in August the same year, Purdew explained that certain clients receive discounts on the basis of their celebrity status or if they are journalists or hold high-ranking positions in public office: "These rugby players are paying, but they're coming on a concession rate because it's just making the place buzz. We do that with actors and journalists and dignitaries. It makes Champneys 'The Place'."

In 2020, The Observer gave Champneys an award for the year's "worst customer service" after it denied customers refunds for bookings cancelled due to the COVID-19 pandemic, despite a contractual clause guaranteeing refunds for cancellations due to exceptional circumstances, then closed its phone lines.

In November 2025 it was announced that Champneys had acquired the Crescent and Old Hall hotels in Buxton.

== Television ==
In 2014, Champneys Tring was the subject of an ITV documentary by Richard Macer.
