= Charles Haslewood Shannon =

English portrait painter (1863–1937)

Charles Haslewood Shannon RA
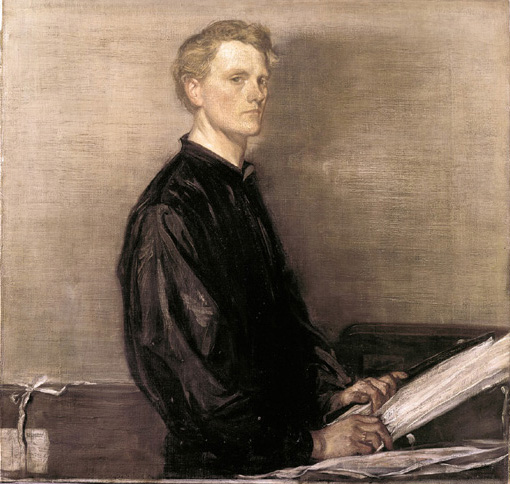
- Self-portrait, 1897
- Born: 26 April 1863; Sleaford, Lincolnshire, England
- Died: 18 March 1937 (aged 73); Kew, London, England
- Resting place: St Botolph's Church, Quarrington
- Education: Lambeth School of Art

Charles Haslewood Shannon RA (Note: Shannon's middle name is alternatively cited as Hazelwood.) (26 April 1863 – 18 March 1937) was an English artist best known for his portraits. His works featured in several major European collections, including London's National Portrait Gallery.

== Biography ==
Shannon was born on 26 April 1863 in Sleaford, Lincolnshire, the son of Rev. Frederick William Shannon, Rector of Quarrington, and Catherine Emma Manthorp, daughter of a surgeon, Daniel Levett Manthorp. He was educated at St John's School, Leatherhead, where he played cricket in the first XI. He then attended the City and Guilds of London Art School (formerly known as South London School of Technical Art, previously Lambeth School of Art) and was later much influenced by his lifetime partner, Charles Ricketts and by the example of the great Venetians. His early work has a heavy, low tone, which he later abandoned for clearer, more transparent colours. He achieved success with his portraits and his Giorgionesque figure compositions, which are marked by a classic sense of style, and with his etchings and lithographs.

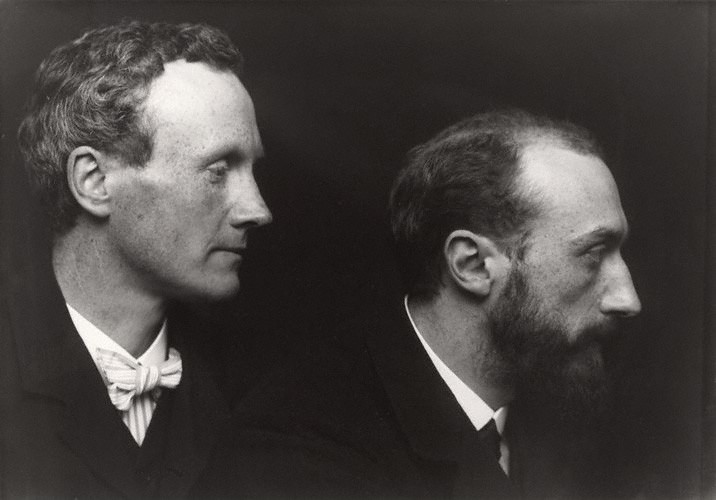
Charles Haslewood Shannon; Charles de Sousy Ricketts by George Charles Beresford

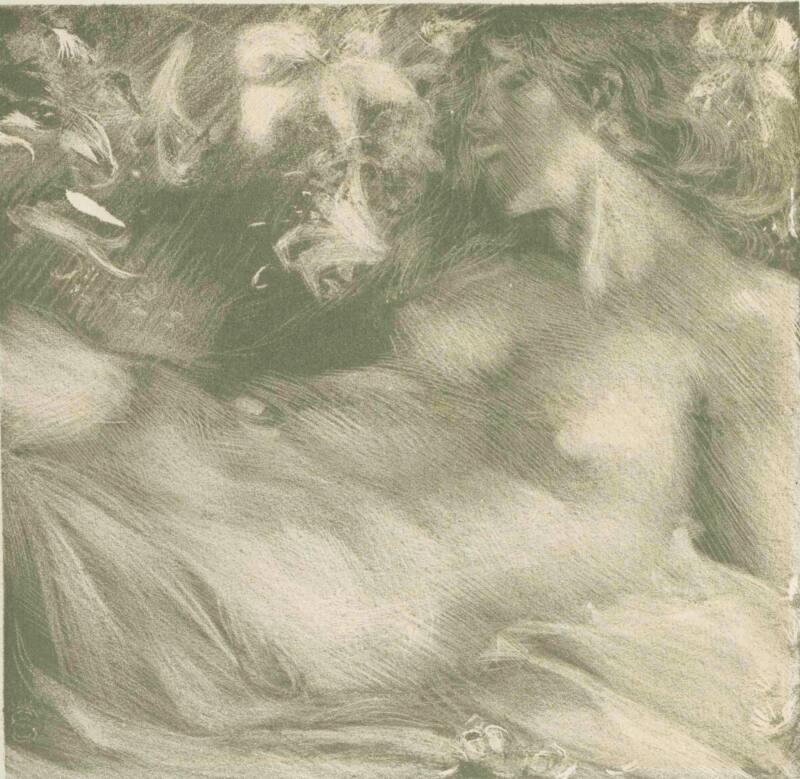
Untitled, Aberdeen Archives, Gallery and Museums Collection

Dublin Municipal Gallery owns several of Shannon's work, including The Bunch of Grapes and The Lady with the Green Fan (a portrait of Mrs Hacon). Another notable subject was the popular novelist Mary Frances Dowdall. His Study in Grey is at the Munich Gallery, a Portrait of Mr Staats Forbes is located in Bremen, and Souvenir of Van Dyck is at the Melbourne Gallery. One remarkable picture is The Toilet of Venus, once part of Lord Northcliffe collection and is now held at Tate Britain. Later works by Shannon include The Amethyst Necklace (1907), The Morning Toilet (1911), The Embroidered Shawl (1914), and The Incoming Tide (1918). In 1918, he produced various portraits, including those of Princess Patricia of Connaught, Lillah McCarthy, and the actress Hilda Moore. Among his lithographs were Playmates (1908), Ebb Tide (1917), The Tidal River and A Sharp Corner (1919).

Shannon was elected as Associate of the Royal Academy in 1911 and became vice-president of the International Society of Sculptors, Painters and Gravers in 1918. He was elected RA. IN 1920.

Several of his portrait works are held in the National Portrait Gallery in London.

Complete sets of his lithographs and etchings were acquired by the British Museum and the Berlin and Dresden print rooms. He was awarded a first-class gold medal at Munich in 1895 and a first-class silver medal in Paris in 1900.

== Personal life ==
Shannon and Ricketts met as teenagers and cohabited in Chelsea for over 50 years until Ricketts died. They also worked together on many projects. Together they designed and illustrated books, set up an art journal, and created the Vale Press, which published over 75 books before it closed in 1904. Shannon became disabled in 1928 after a fall while hanging a picture. The neurological damage he suffered caused amnesia and ended his career.

He died at his home, 21 Kew Gardens Road, Kew. The funeral took place at Golders Green Crematorium with a memorial service held at St James's, Piccadilly.

== Selected works ==
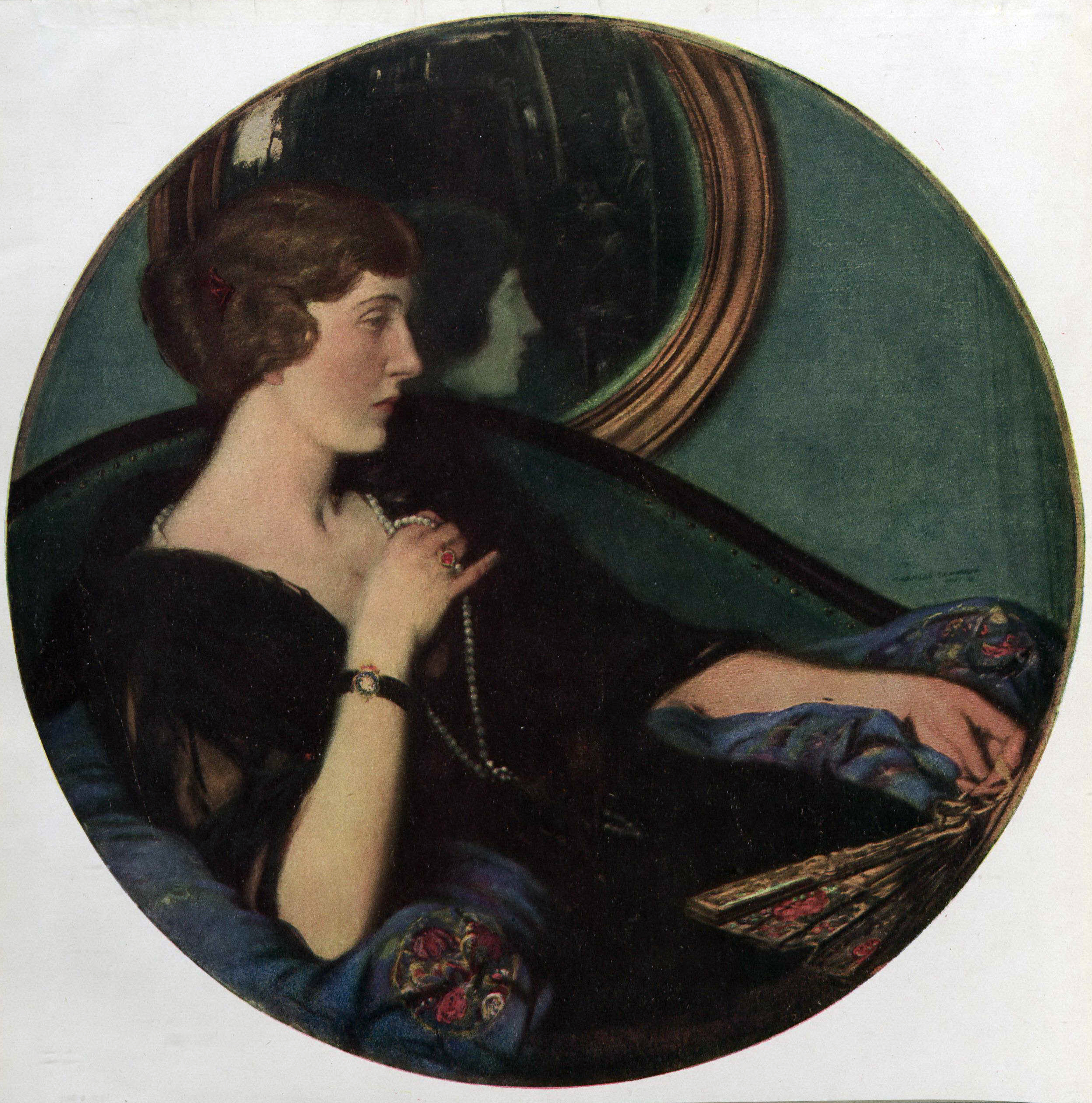
Princess Patricia of Connaught

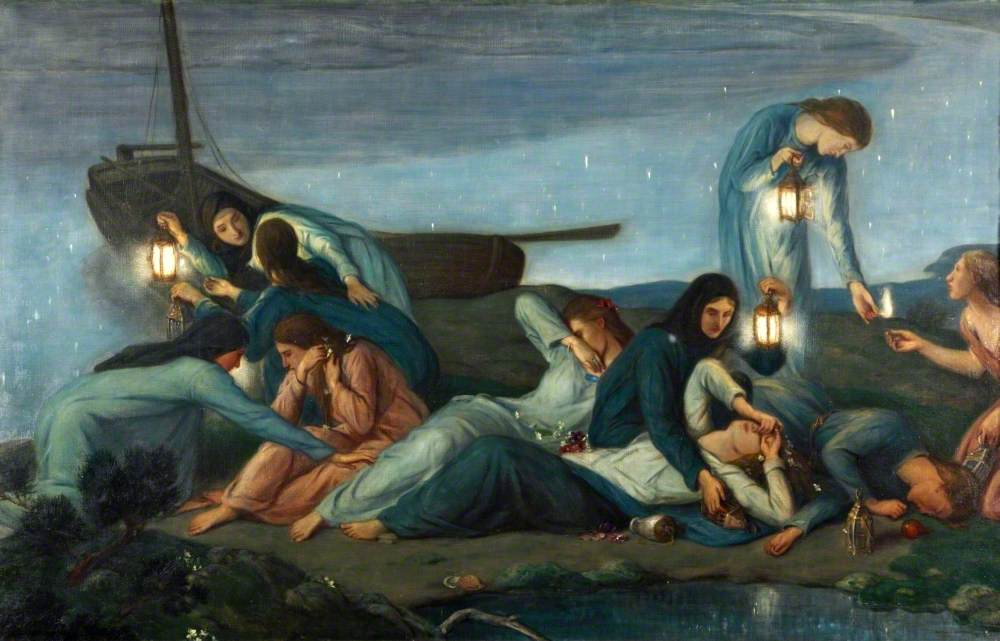
The Wise and Foolish Virgins

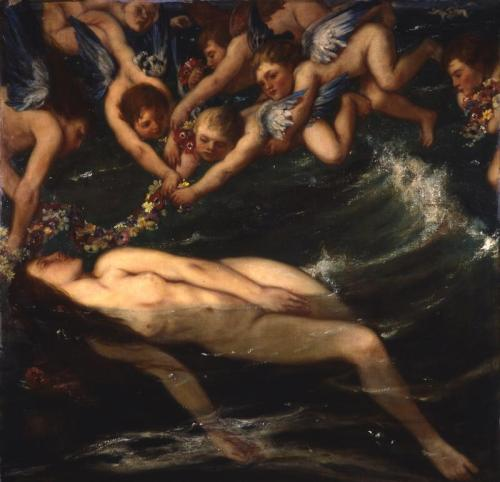
The Birth of Venus

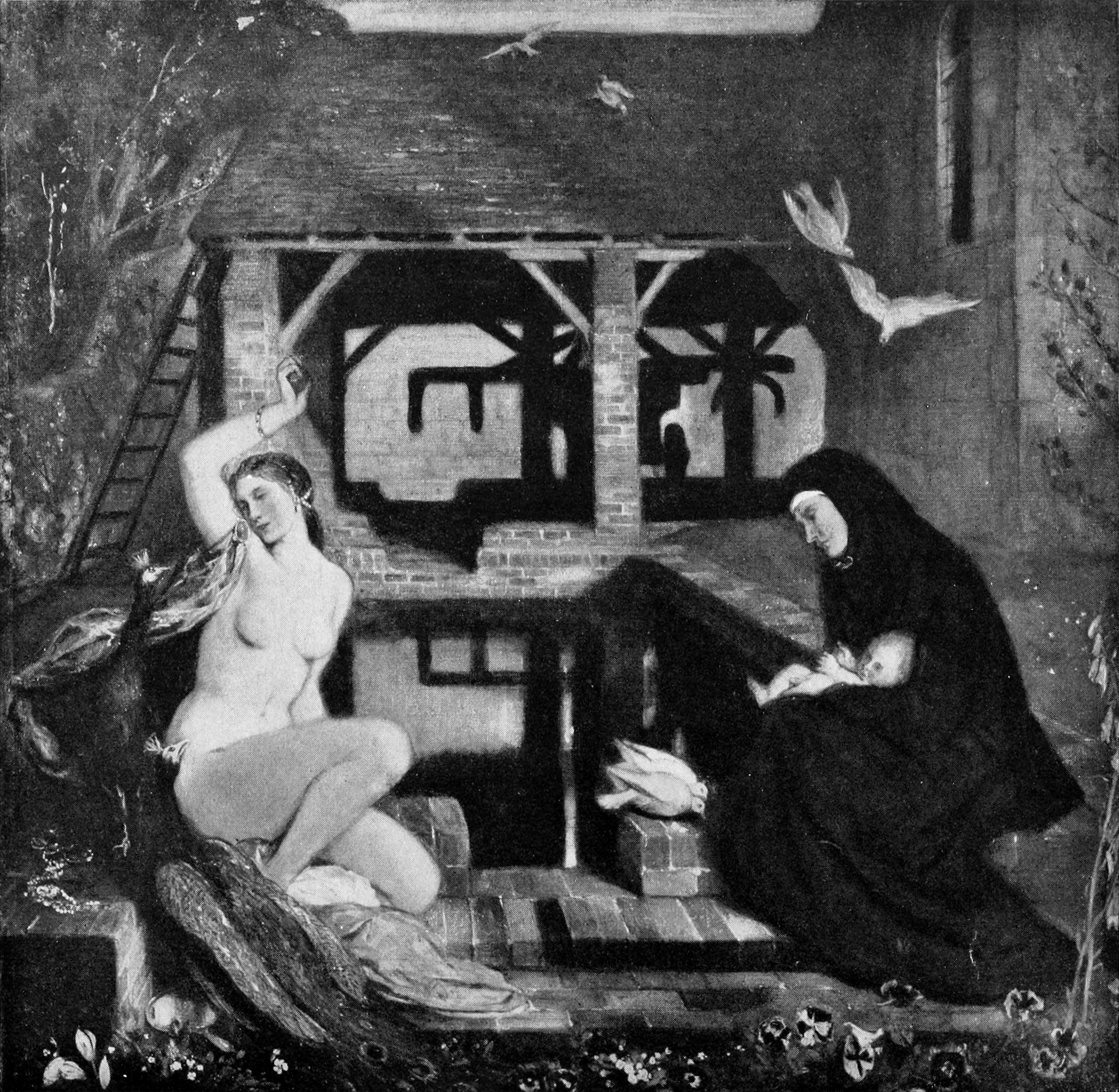
Vanity and Sanctity

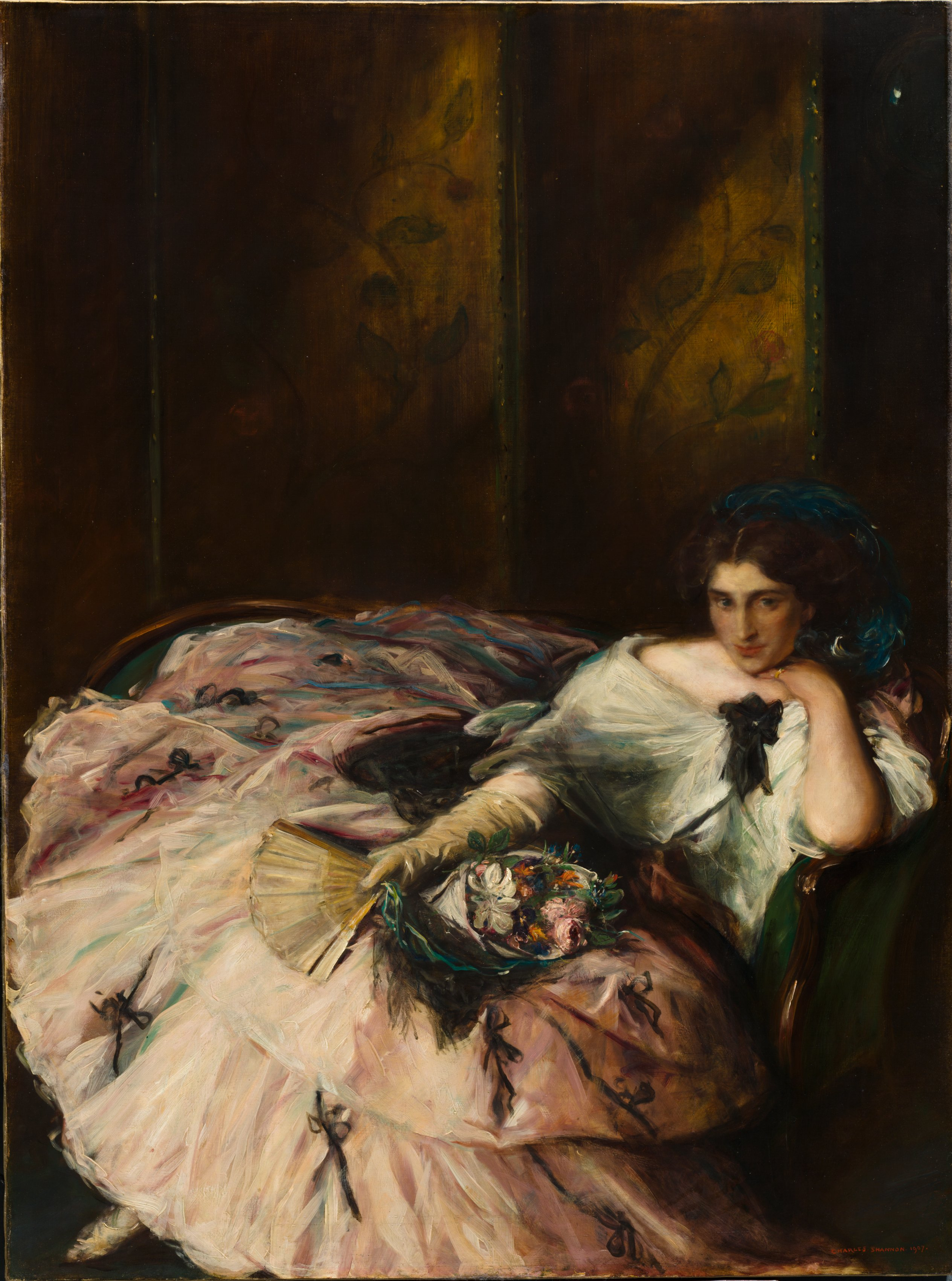
Portrait of Miss Kathleen Bruce

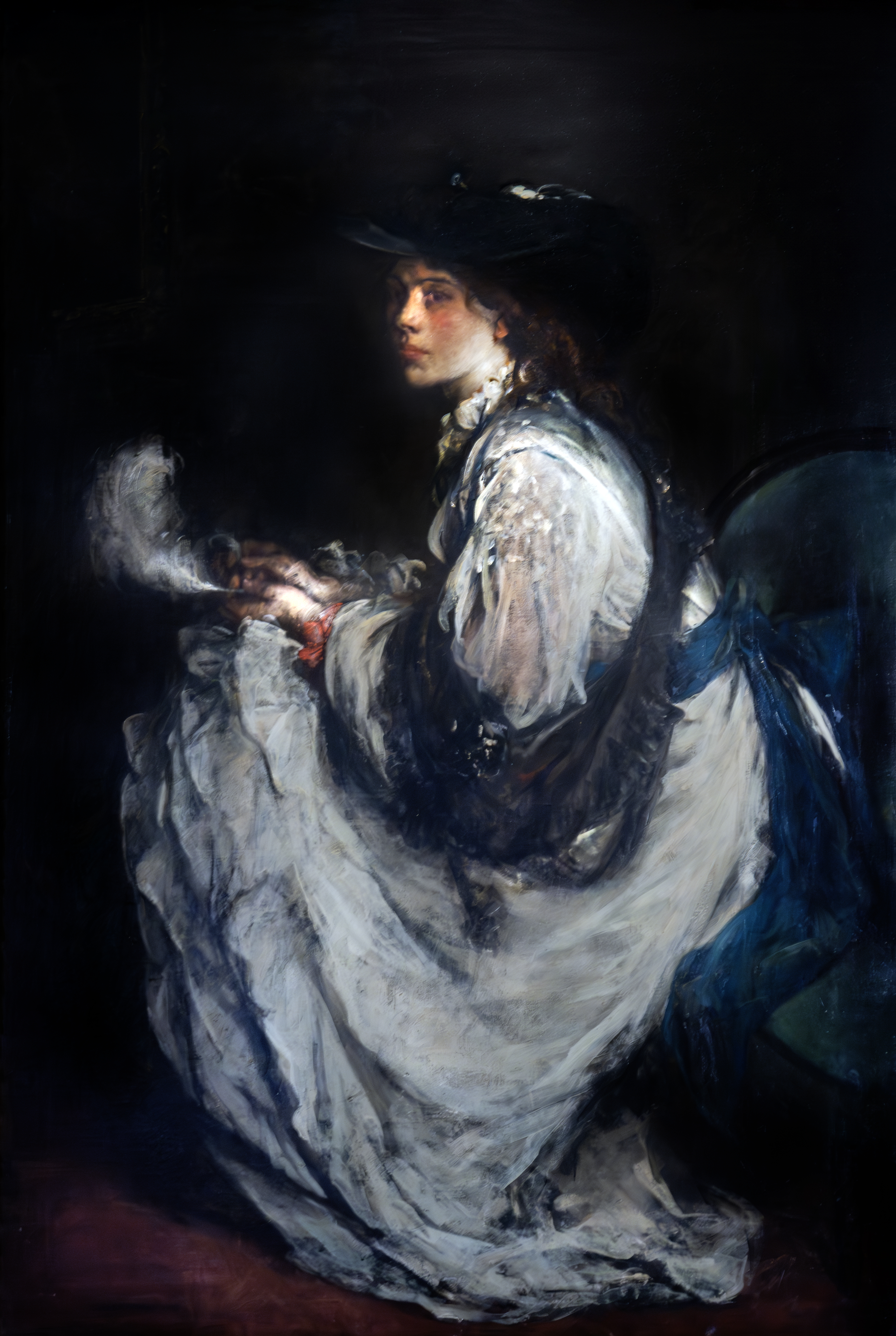
The Lady with a feather – Ca' Pesaro

== Sources ==
- Derry, Georges (December 1914). "The Lithographs of Charles Hazelwood Shannon (with catalogue)". The Print Collector's Quarterly. 4 (4): 393.
