= Joshua Rowe =

Chief Justice of Jamaica

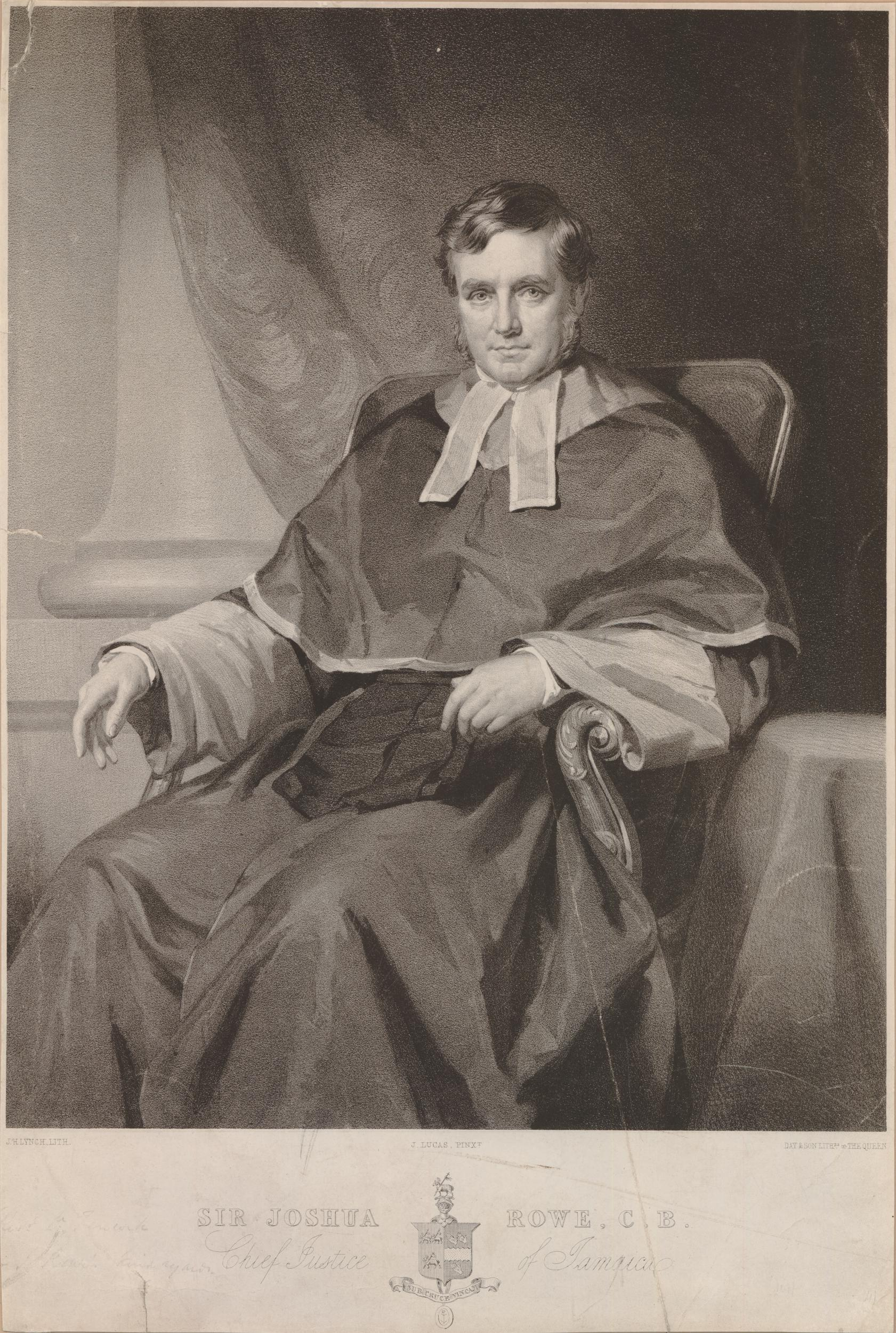
Sir Joshua Rowe

Sir Joshua Rowe (1799 – 30 October 1874) was an English barrister and judge, Chief Justice of Jamaica from 1832 to c. 1856.

Rowe was the son of Joshua Rowe of Torpoint. He was admitted to the Inner Temple in 1818, and called to the bar in 1824. He was a plantation owner in Jamaica, from 1839, after the abolition of slavery there.

== Family ==
Rowe married in 1823 Frances Ann Bate, daughter of James Bate of Exeter.
