= Stanley Lief =

Latvian naturopath

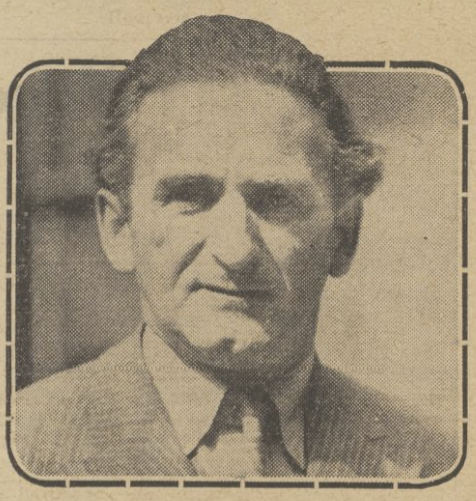
- Born: 9 October 1892; Ludza
- Died: 12 January 1963; France
- Occupation: Naturopath

Stanley Lief (9 October 1892 – 12 January 1963) was a British naturopath, osteopath and owner of Champneys nature cure resort. He was the founder of the British Naturopathic Association and the British College of Naturopathy and Osteopathy.

== Biography ==
Lief was born in Ludza on 9 October 1892. He was one of five children of Isaac and Riva Lief whose Jewish surname was shortened. The family emigrated to Johannesburg when he was a young child. During his childhood, Lief was described as "ridden with illness" and suffered from a weak heart.

As a teenager he took interest in physical culture and was influenced by the teachings of Bernarr Macfadden. He enrolled at MacFadden's International College of Drugless Physicians in Chicago where he qualified as a Doctor of Osteopathy. He became Macfadden's "star pupil". He built up his physique to become a wrestling champion in Illinois. Lief also studied naturopathy at Henry Lindlahr's sanatorium in Chicago. In 1914, He moved to England where he managed Macfadden's Orchard Leigh Sanitorium in Brighton.

In 1921, Lief and James Thompson founded the Nature Cure Association. In 1925, he purchased Champneys in Tring and converted it into a nature cure resort where he had many years practice. In 1936, he founded the British College of Naturopathy and Osteopathy (currently known as the British College of Osteopathic Medicine). He was President of the British Naturopathic and Osteopathic Association several times between 1945 and 1956. In 1945, Lief established the British Naturopathic Association. After World War II he published the magazine Health for All. In 1953, Hector Frazer, one of Lief's patients donated him Frazer House located at Netherhall Gardens. Frazer House is the headquarters of the British College Of Osteopathic Medicine.

He died on 12 January 1963. Lief's son Peter was also a naturopath and worked at Enton Hall Clinic in Surrey.

== Naturopathy ==
Lief argued that all disease was caused by toxaemia from excessive food consumption and the wrong foods. He described the germ theory of disease as a "prize bogy", believing that germs are not a cause of disease but only a secondary manifestation. In 1931, he commented that "no ailment is produced in the body by chance nor is it caused by an outside influence. Ill-health always arises from a condition within the body". Lief advocated for a nature cure approach that he practiced himself and for his patients. He slept on a veranda all year round, drank two glasses of cold lemon water upon waking and shaved naked in front of an open window. His regimen also involved a cold sitz bath and no more than two meals per day.

Lief advocated for fasting and warned against the dangers of over-eating. He promoted extreme orange juice fasts up to 93 days. He lectured for vegetarian organizations but was not a vegetarian in his personal life. He ate meat several times a fortnight.

His diet philosophy for his patients was encapsulated by the phrase "stop eating". His dietary advice was extreme as his patients at Champneys were given only fruit juices, grapes, whole wheat bread and butter. Some of his patients were living on only water up to 21 days and were known locally as "Lief's loonies". Lief was proud of the title "King of Quacks" which he said the medical community gave him.

Lief developed Neuromuscular Therapy (NMT) with his cousin Boris Chaitow. Neuromuscular Therapy is a manual therapy that involves applying pressure to soft tissues to address muscle and nerve related issues. The therapy took influence from ayurveda, chiropractic and naturopathy techniques.

== Lawsuit ==
In 1933, Eleanor May Walton sued Lief, seeking damages for facial disfigurement which she alleged had been caused by negligence on the part of Lief's treatment he guaranteed would cure her lupus erythematosus. She also alleged a breach of contract. Lief's method of treating her skin involved the application of light rays and a starvation diet. A jury found in favour of Walton and she was awarded £123.

== Selected publications ==
- How to Eat for Health: Diet Reform Simplified. London: Health for All Publishing Co. 1950.
