= Great Limber Preceptory, Limber Magna =

Farm in Great Limber, Lincolnshire, England, UK

Coordinates: 53.5607°N 0.2830°W

Great Limber Preceptory, Limber Magna was a Camera (farm) of the Knights Templar and later the Knights Hospitaller in the village of Great Limber (or Limber Magna), Lincolnshire, England.

The manor and church of Great Limber were granted by Richard de Humet of Normandy, France and Agnes his wife, to the Cistercian abbey of Aunay in Normandy, and their charter was confirmed by King Henry II in 1157. It seems likely that the property was a grange rather than a priory. The manor and church were sold by the abbot of Aunay in 1393 to the priory of St. Anne at Coventry.

The site of the grange, or priory, later became a Camera (farm) of first the Knights Templars, and then the Knights Hospitallers between the 14th and 16th centuries. After the Dissolution of the Monasteries in 1540 the house was first occupied by Thomas Smyth and then sold to the Pelham family until its abandonment in the 17th century. The site is now an ancient scheduled monument.

== Lincolnshire preceptories ==
Until their disbandment in 1312, the Knights Templar were major landowners on the higher lands of Lincolnshire, where they had a number of preceptories on property which provided income, while Temple Bruer was an estate on the Lincoln Heath, believed to have been used also for military training. The preceptories from which the Lincolnshire properties were managed were:

- Aslackby Preceptory, Kesteven (TF0830)
- Bottesford, Lindsey (SE8907)
- Eagle, Kesteven (SK875672)
- Great Limber, Lindsey (TA1308)
- Horkstow, Lindsey (SE9818)
- Witham Preceptory, Kesteven (SK928205)
- Temple Bruer, Kesteven (TF0054)
- Willoughton Preceptory, Lindsey (SK923931)
- Byard's Leap (SK990494) was part of the Temple Bruer estate.

== See also ==
- Great Limber Priory, Limber Magna
