= Aslackby and Laughton =

Civil parish in the South Kesteven district of Lincolnshire, England

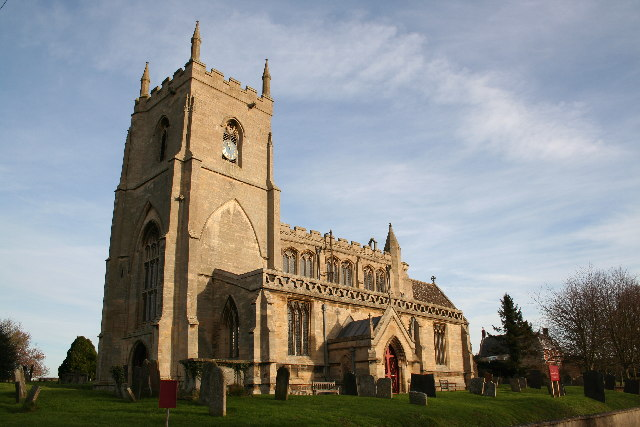
- St James' Church, Aslackby

- Location within Lincolnshire
- Population: 251 (2011)
- OS grid reference: TF083305
  - London: 95 mi (153 km) S
- Civil parish: Aslackby and Laughton
- District: South Kesteven
- Shire county: Lincolnshire
- Region: East Midlands
- Country: England
- Sovereign state: United Kingdom
- Post town: Sleaford
- Postcode district: NG34
- Police: Lincolnshire
- Fire: Lincolnshire
- Ambulance: East Midlands
- UK Parliament: Grantham and Bourne

Parish boundary within Lincolnshire

Aslackby and Laughton is a civil parish in the South Kesteven district of Lincolnshire, England. According to the 2001 census the parish had a population of 243, in 102 households. increasing slightly to 251 in 118 households at the 2011 census. It consists of the village of Aslackby, the hamlet of Laughton, and scattered farms, and part of the hamlet of Graby.

== Aslackby ==
Aslackby (/ˈeɪzəlbi/ AY-zəl-bee; 52°51′35″N 0°23′20″W) is a small village extending westwards from the A15 road between Rippingale and Folkingham, about halfway between Sleaford and Bourne.

Aslackby Grade I listed Anglican church is dedicated to St James. The chancel is Early English, largely rebuilt 1856, with the tower and nave, Perpendicular. The ecclesiastical parish is Aslackby, part of The Billingborough Group of the Lafford Deanery

There is a dining club, The Templars, for long-term residents, and a local history society.

=== History ===
The Aveland, a moat said to be the meeting place for the Wapentake of Aveland is in the parish. There is documentary evidence for a settlement called Avethorpe, from the Domesday survey onwards, but no actual location is known.

== Laughton ==
The hamlet of Laughton (52°52′20″N 0°23′58″W) lies less than 1 mile (1.6 km) to the north of Aslackby. West Laughton at its south-west is the site of a deserted medieval village (DMV).

== Lincolnshire preceptories ==
Until their disbandment in 1312, the Knights Templar were major landowners on the higher lands of Lincolnshire, where they had a number of preceptories on property which provided income, while Temple Bruer was an estate on the Lincoln Heath, believed to have been used also for military training. The preceptories from which the Lincolnshire properties were managed were:

- Aslackby Preceptory, Kesteven (TF0830)
- Bottesford, Lindsey (SE8907)
- Eagle, Kesteven (SK875672)
- Great Limber, Lindsey (TA1308)
- Horkstow, Lindsey (SE9818)
- Witham Preceptory, Kesteven (SK928205)
- Temple Bruer, Kesteven (TF0054)
- Willoughton Preceptory, Lindsey (SK923931)
- Byard's Leap (SK990494) was part of the Temple Bruer estate.

== Gallery ==
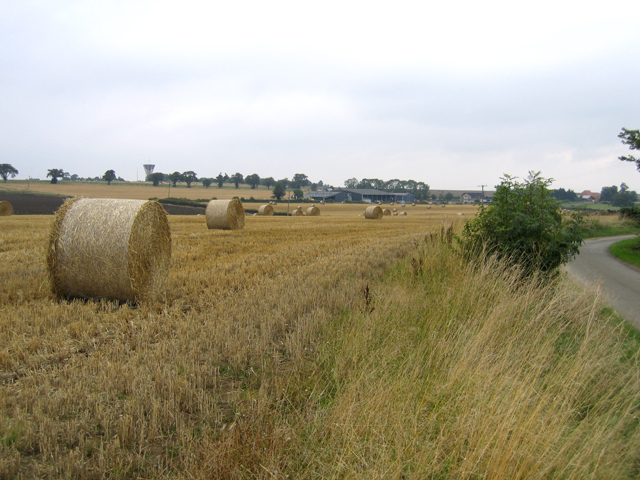
Typical agricultural scene in Laughton

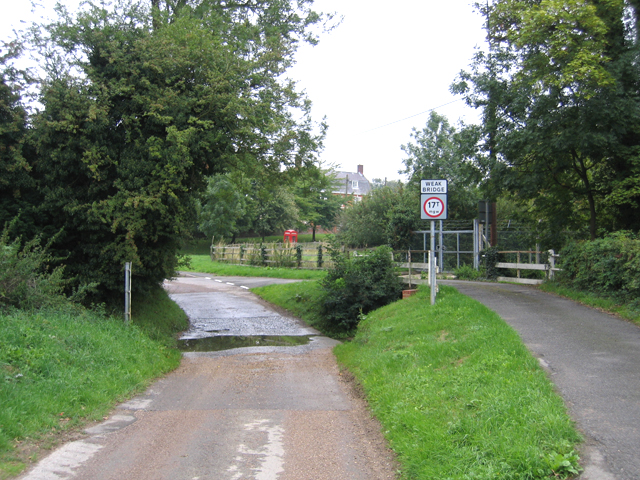
The ford in Aslackby

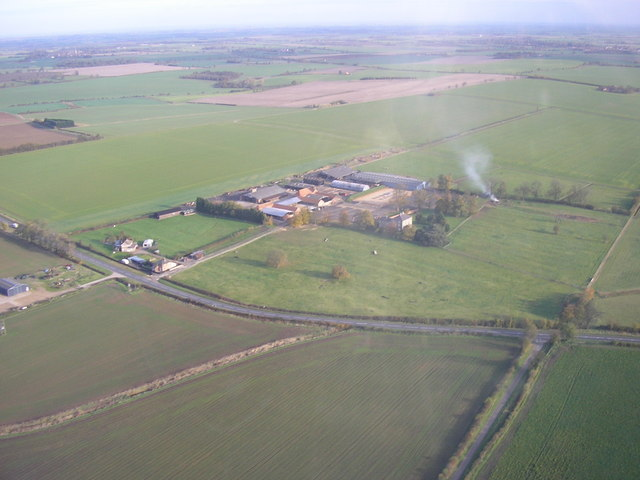
Laughton Manor Farm from the air

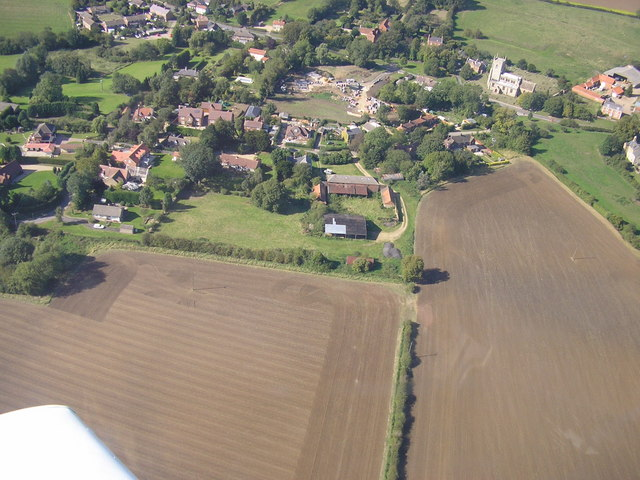
Aslackby village from the air
