= Willoughton =

Village and civil parish in the West Lindsey district of Lincolnshire, England

Coordinates: 53.426926°N 0.601379°W

- St Andrew's Church, Willoughton

- Location within Lincolnshire
- Population: 341 (2011)
- OS grid reference: SK930931
  - London: 140 mi (230 km) SSE
- District: West Lindsey
- Shire county: Lincolnshire
- Region: East Midlands
- Country: England
- Sovereign state: United Kingdom
- Post town: Gainsborough
- Postcode district: DN21
- Police: Lincolnshire
- Fire: Lincolnshire
- Ambulance: East Midlands
- UK Parliament: Gainsborough (UK Parliament constituency)

Willoughton (/ˈwɪlətən/ WIL-ə-tən) is a village and civil parish in the West Lindsey district of Lincolnshire, England. It is situated 2 miles (3.2 km) west from the A15 road, 13 miles (21 km) north from Lincoln and 3 miles (5 km) south from Kirton Lindsey. According to the 2001 census the village had a population of 330, increasing to 341 at the 2011 census.

The name 'Willoughton' derives from the Old English wilig-tūn meaning 'willow tree farm/settlement'.

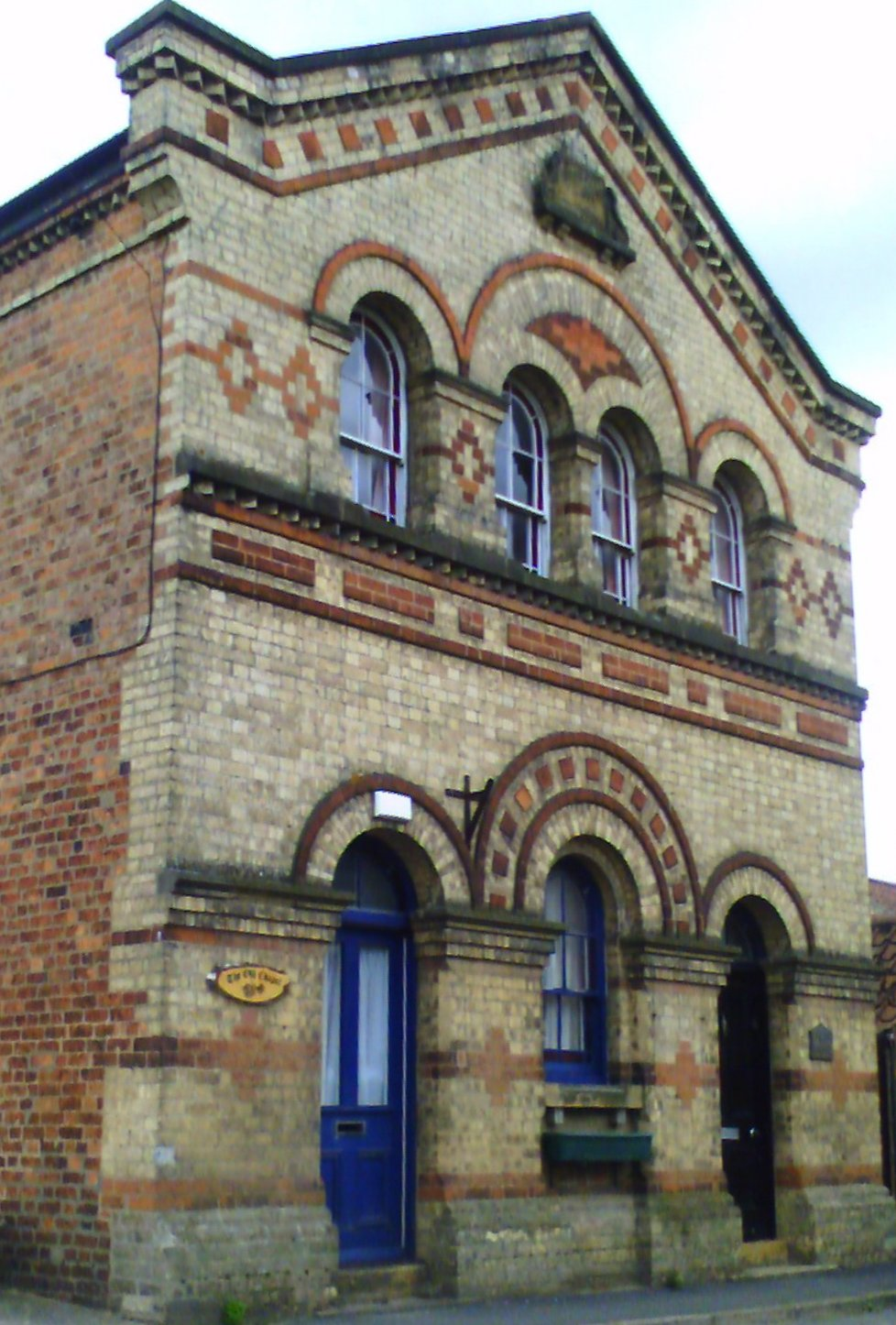
Old Primitive Methodist Chapel

The church of St Andrew was built in 1794 to replace earlier buildings on the site, and was restored in 1888. It is of Georgian style. There was a Primitive Methodist chapel, built in 1866, replacing an earlier chapel of 1837. It closed in 1979 and has since been converted into apartments.

Willoughton has a post office and village shop, a primary school, village hall and a public house, the Stirrup.

The folklorist, historian and archaeologist Ethel Rudkin lived in the village for much of her life.

== Lincolnshire preceptories ==
Until their disbandment in 1312, the Knights Templar were major landowners on the higher lands of Lincolnshire, where they had a number of preceptories on property which provided income, while Temple Bruer was an estate on the Lincoln Heath, believed to have been used also for military training. The preceptories from which the Lincolnshire properties were managed were:

- Aslackby Preceptory, Kesteven (TF0830)
- Bottesford, Lindsey (SE8907)
- Eagle, Kesteven (SK875672)
- Great Limber, Lindsey (TA1308)
- Horkstow, Lindsey (SE9818)
- Witham Preceptory, Kesteven (SK928205)
- Temple Bruer, Kesteven (TF0054)
- Willoughton Preceptory, Lindsey (SK923931)
- Byard's Leap (SK990494) was part of the Temple Bruer estate.
