= Bottesford, Lincolnshire =

Town in North Lincolnshire, England

Coordinates: 53.55206°N 0.67143°W

Bottesford
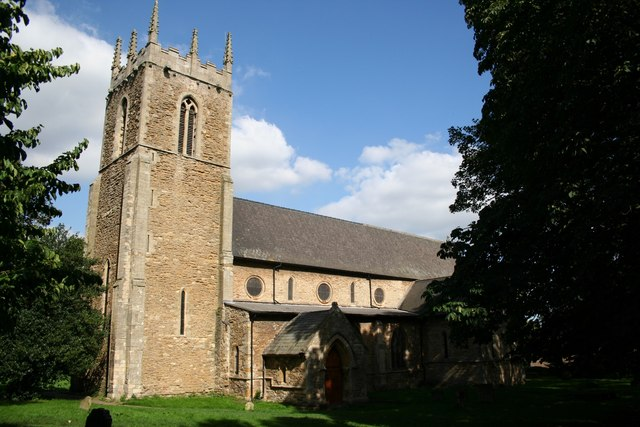
- St Peter's Church, Bottesford

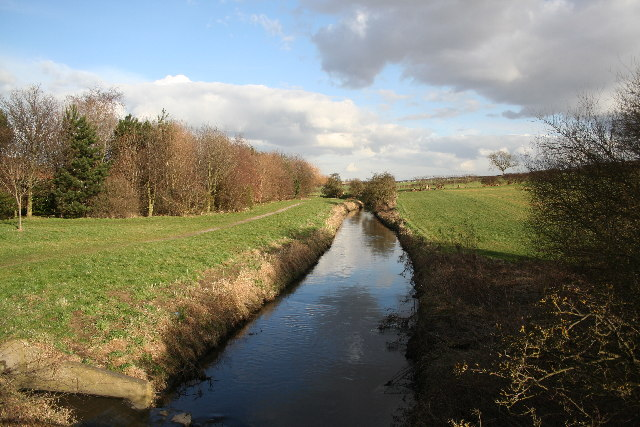
- Bottesford Beck; The southern parish boundary

- Location within Lincolnshire
- Population: 11,038 (2011)
- OS grid reference: SE895079
  - London: 145 mi (233 km) S
- Unitary authority: North Lincolnshire
- Ceremonial county: Lincolnshire
- Region: Yorkshire and the Humber
- Country: England
- Sovereign state: United Kingdom
- Post town: SCUNTHORPE
- Postcode district: DN16, DN17
- Dialling code: 01724
- Police: Humberside
- Fire: Humberside
- Ambulance: East Midlands
- UK Parliament: Scunthorpe

Bottesford is a town in North Lincolnshire, Lincolnshire, England.

Historically a village, Bottesford forms a contiguous urban area of Scunthorpe. In the 2001 Census, Bottesford's population was recorded as 11,171, falling to 11,038 at the 2011 census. The town is directly south of Scunthorpe, west of Brigg and north of Gainsborough and Kirton in Lindsey.

== History and landmarks ==
The name Bottesford derives from the Old English bōðlford meaning a 'ford with a dwelling'.

Bottesford is written in Domesday as "Budlesford", and until the 20th century it was a small farming village. Yaddlethorpe appears in Domesday as "Laudltorp".

The Grade I listed Anglican parish church is dedicated to St. Peter ad Vincula. The church is Early English style and cruciform in plan, built on the site of an earlier Saxon church. It was restored in 1870; during restoration were found two Saxon sundials that were incorporated into the south porch.

Local landmarks include Bottesford Beck, and Bottesford Preceptory where it is said that the Knight's Templar and later Knights of St John made a base.

== Lincolnshire preceptories ==
Until their disbandment in 1312, the Knights Templar were major landowners on the higher lands of Lincolnshire, where they had a number of preceptories on property which provided income, while Temple Bruer was an estate on the Lincoln Heath, believed to have been used also for military training. The preceptories from which the Lincolnshire properties were managed were:

- Aslackby Preceptory, Kesteven (TF0830)
- Bottesford, Lindsey (SE8907)
- Eagle, Kesteven (SK875672)
- Great Limber, Lindsey (TA1308)
- Horkstow, Lindsey (SE9818)
- Witham Preceptory, Kesteven (SK928205)
- Temple Bruer, Kesteven (TF0054)
- Willoughton Preceptory, Lindsey (SK923931)
- Byard's Leap (SK990494) was part of the Temple Bruer estate.

== Amenities and schools ==
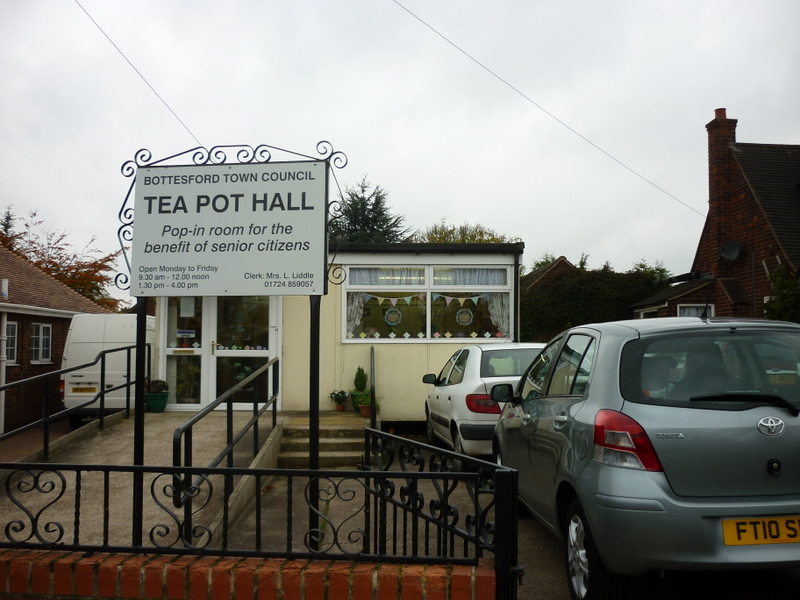
Tea Pot Hall – formerly a meeting place for the elderly, since relocated.

There is a library and medical centre on Cambridge Avenue.

There are two junior schools, Bottesford Junior, and Leys Farm Junior School. There is also one primary school, Holme Valley Primary, on Timberland.

The local secondary school, the Frederick Gough School, opened in 1960 as Ashby Grammar School. It became Bottesford Grammar School, then Frederick Gough Grammar School named after the first chairman of the school governors. It became comprehensive in 1969 when it joined with Ashby Girls' Secondary School, a secondary modern school on Ashby High Street. Other students travel to the nearby Melior Community Academy in Scunthorpe which has special links to the Leys Farm junior school.

The ecclesiastical parish is Bottesford St Peters part of the Bottesford with Ashby Team Ministry of the Deanery of Manlake. The team vicar is The Revd Graham Lines. Whilst the two Methodist chapels recorded in 1872 have closed, in 2002 a new Baptist church was opened in Chancel Road, having been meeting in the Civic Hall since 1978.

A civic hall is run by the town council for social events. A sports hall stands adjacent to the football and cricket pitches in Birch Park.
