= South Witham =

Village and civil parish in the South Kesteven district of Lincolnshire, England

Coordinates: 52.762580°N 0.629333°W

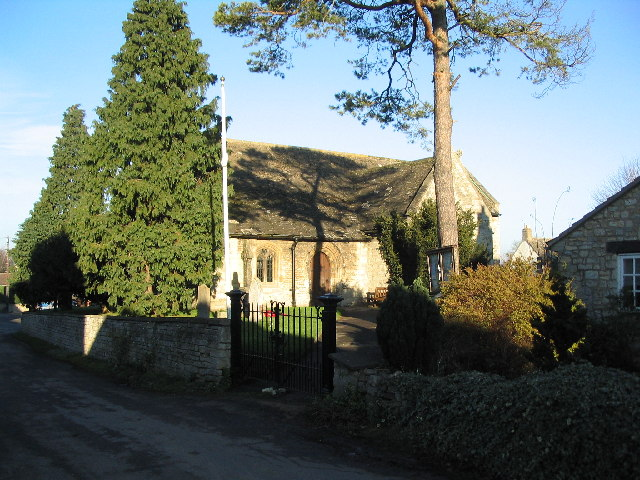
- St John the Baptist Church, South Witham

- Location within Lincolnshire
- Population: 1,533 (2011)
- OS grid reference: SK925192
  - London: 90 mi (140 km) S
- District: South Kesteven
- Shire county: Lincolnshire
- Region: East Midlands
- Country: England
- Sovereign state: United Kingdom
- Post town: Grantham
- Postcode district: NG33
- Police: Lincolnshire
- Fire: Lincolnshire
- Ambulance: East Midlands
- UK Parliament: Rutland and Stamford

South Witham is a village and civil parish in the South Kesteven district of Lincolnshire, England. The population of the civil parish at the 2011 census was 1,533. It is situated 10 miles (16 km) south of Grantham, 10 miles east of Melton Mowbray and 10 miles (16 km) north of Oakham. The village is close to the Leicestershire and Rutland borders.

== History ==
The village takes its name from the River Witham which rises nearby. But the origin of the word Witham is still unknown. The village has until recently also been spelt as "South Wytham".

Richard Troughton was the Bailiff of South Witham; he was imprisoned by charges brought against him by Thomas Wymberley, partly due to Troughton's part in the Duke of Northumberland's attempt to put Lady Jane Grey, Northumberland's daughter-in-law, on the throne. Instead of Lady Jane, Mary I became Queen, when Edward VI died in July 1553. John Dudley, 1st Duke of Northumberland was accused of treason for his plot.

In 1966, the Royal Air Force built a large housing estate on the opposite side of the River Witham. The houses were intended for servicemen at RAF Cottesmore, but were taken instead by personnel at RAF North Luffenham. The village trebled in size virtually overnight, and the primary school was similarly increased in size. A NAAFI was provided for the forces' families.

=== 1973 Canberra crash ===
On Thursday 2 August 1973 at around 11 pm, Canberra B2 WJ674 of 231 OCU crashed in the field east of The Fox public house, near Woodbine Farm in North Witham parish.

Three sets of fire crew from RAF Cottesmore arrived, with three other civilian sets from Grantham, Stamford and Corby. The first RAF fire crew had exited the airfield from the crash gate 1 near Greetham, Rutland.

John Stafford heard two distinct bangs (the ejection seats being fired) and an intense flash of light, and called emergency services. Flt Lt John Dennis was killed, aged 26, the pilot, and married from Crantock near Newquay, with a 10-month old baby; he was on attachment on the No.50 course at Cottesmore from RAF St Mawgan in Cornwall. Flt Lt Max Murray, the survivor aged 38, was a navigator, with a 13 year old son, and a daughter.

Vincent Davies, who owned The Fox also called the police, and ran to the scene, and spoke to the pilot before he died, a few minutes later. Pathologist Trevor Spencer said the pilot died from multiple fractures, mainly to the ribs, legs, and pelvis. The dead pilot was found by policeman Brian Parrish, and taken to the RAF Medical Centre at RAF Spitalgate in Grantham. The ejection seats were fired when the aircraft was at 700 feet.

John Dennis's wife Michèle died in 2012. WJ674 was the first of the last batch of Canberras made by Handley Page, and entered service on 26 October 1954.

=== Super dairy ===
In 2010 a plan for a super-dairy with almost 3,000 cows was withdrawn after concerns expressed by residents.

== Geography ==
South Witham is bisected by the River Witham, about 3 miles (4.8 km) to the east of its source. It is the point on the A1 where it enters Lincolnshire from the south, near The Fox Inn. The parish of 1,770 acres (7 km^{2}) acres borders Thistleton and Rutland to the south, and the boundary to the west meets Wymondham, Leicestershire at Thistleton Gap. The parish includes the Forty Acre Wood to the north-west, where it borders Gunby. The boundary goes due east to meet North Witham parish at the first undulation in the road northwards.

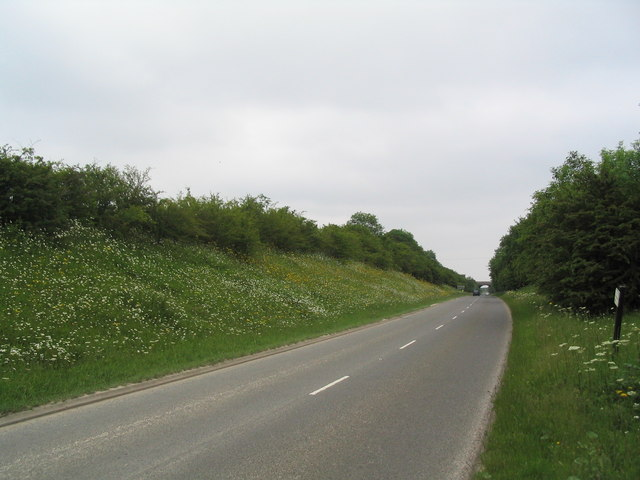
Nature reserve along former railway cutting

Crossing the road, the boundary goes due eastwards to meet the A1, which it then follows due south on the east side of the road. The boundary goes through The Fox, with North Witham parish to the east, to a point just south of the A1 interchange. The A1 was upgraded in early August 1971, through Rutland, to Tickencote (built by Rutland County Council). Before the road was improved, the South Witham crossroads on the A1 lay at the point where the sliproads join today.

Nearby to the south was RAF Cottesmore, and the village was the centre of the flight path circuit.

=== Quarrying ===
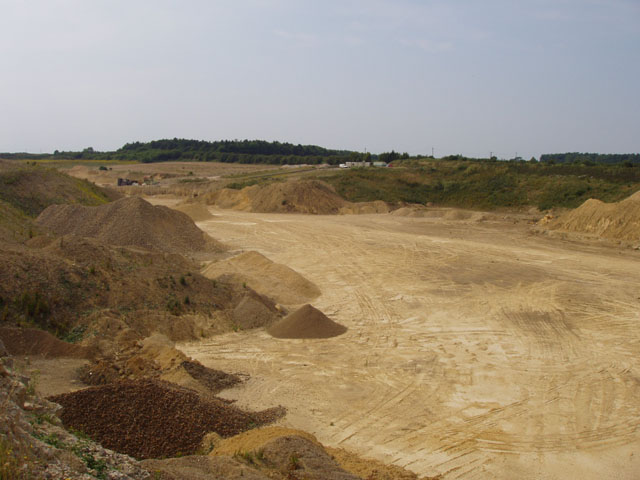
Quarrying began in South Witham when the railway was built in the 1890s; the village was known for its limepits in the 1800s

Quarrying began in the village when the railway was built in the 1890s. The geology of the area is 40 cm of topsoil, 32 metres of brown clay (Oadby Till, from Anglian glaciation), 10 metres of limestone (Lincolnshire Limestone Formation), 4 metres of Lower Estuarine Clay (Grantham Formation), 6 metres of ironstone (Northampton Sand Formation), then 7 metres of Upper Lias Clay (Whitby Mudstone).

Ironstone originated from deposits on the Lias and oolites, which stretch from Dorset to Teesside; ironstone occurs mainly on the western edge cliff; Scunthorpe is on the Lower Lias. But in the south of county, ironstone is on the Marlstone Rock bed, on the upper portion of Middle Lias. Ironstone quarrying began in 1944; Stewarts and Lloyds Minerals Ltd owned the site from 1950. The adit (6.7 metre diameter) extended as far south as Hooby Lodge. Production was hoped to be 1 million tons of iron ore a year, but only reached 390,000 tons in 1962, and closed on 27 June 1964. The London, Midland and Scottish Railway railway through the village closed in the same year; the adit was bricked up in 1966.

=== Economy ===
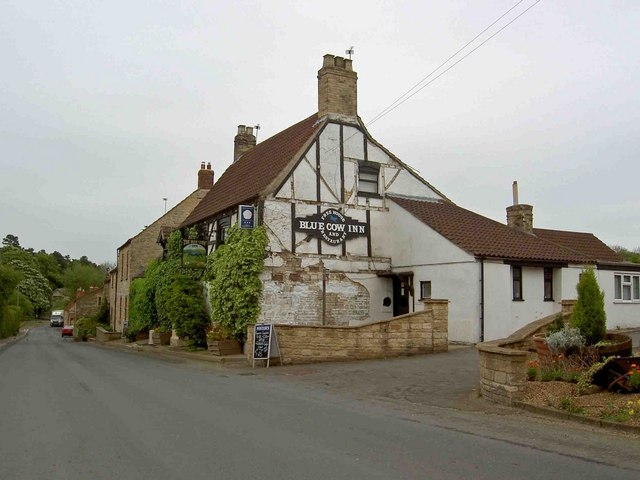
Blue Cow

On the road to Wymondham is a limestone quarry owned by Breedon Aggregates, containing around 3.2 million tonnes of limestone. Ennstone Johnston bought the quarry for £1.5 million in April 2004 from GRS. Close by to the north is a former ironstone quarry. Other companies based in the village include Compressed Air Plant, Auriga, Petlife International and Clever Cooks. In the parish on the northbound A1 is the Grantham South Witham Travelodge. One village public house is the Blue Cow in the High Street and the other is The Angel near the village church.

=== Railway ===
There was once a South Witham railway station which is now closed. The line went from Melton, via Bourne, to Spalding. In 1898 a branch line was built from the railway (near to the quarry) to Buckminster to transport iron ore for the Holwell Iron Company, later the Appleby-Frodingham Steel Company, and ran parallel to Sewstern Lane.

=== Church ===
The church is dedicated to St John the Baptist and included in the Withams Group of Churches of North Witham, Stainby and Gunby. In the 19th century the vicar was Ralph Tollemache, nephew of Lord Frederick Tollemache. He built the primary school in 1879. His eldest son, Sir Lyonel Tollemache, born in 1854, became Lord Tollemache in 1935.

On 22 February 1869, Ralph Tollemache married Dora de Orellana (1847–1927), the daughter of Spanish Lt-Colonel Ignacio De Orellana (born 1793), being born in the Channel Islands. Ralph had already had five children, and with Dora he had another nine children; her brother Ignatius, a dentist, married in 1856, with one of her brother's sons being the British light music composer Ignatius de Orellana (1860–1931), who worked on the 1924 Pageant of Empire; her brother's shop is now the Millets store in St Helier. His sixth child acted as a vicar of the village, and fought as a captain, aged 34, with the First Battalion of the Lincolnshire Regiment; his body was never found after 1 November 1914, and his name is inscribed on the Menin Gate in Belgium. Another brother, Leone Sextus Tollemache, served with the Leicestershire Regiment, but had transferred as a Brigade major in the Third Australian Brigade, of the First Australian Division, being killed on 20 February 1917, and was buried at Dernancourt in France.

Frances, the granddaughter of John Hay, 4th Marquess of Tweeddale, the Secretary of State for Scotland lived in village; she married Charles Manners-Tollemache, the nephew of the Earl of Dysart, in 1797. She died on 29 March 1801 in the village, aged 26. Charles Manners-Tollemache's father, John Manners, was an MP for Newark from 1754 to 1774, who had married Lady Louisa Tollemache, thus joining the Tollemache and Manners families, and taking the Tollemache name. His elder brother (William Tollemache, who took the family title) would have a granddaughter Caroline Tollemache (daughter of Felix Tollemache, 1796–1843), who married her cousin Ralph, the vicar of the village. Ralph was another grandson of Charles Manners' elder brother, John Manners.

There were two chapels – a Methodist and Congregationalist (now known nationally as the United Reformed Church). One chapel on Thistleton Road became a vintage motorcycle museum. The owner later claimed to be Britain's safest driver, having taken to the wheel in 1925 (at the age of 15), and buying his first car, a Willys Overland Crossley Whippet in 1935 for £2.50. He sold his collection of eighty 1920s and 1930s motorcycles in March 2003.

=== Archaeology ===
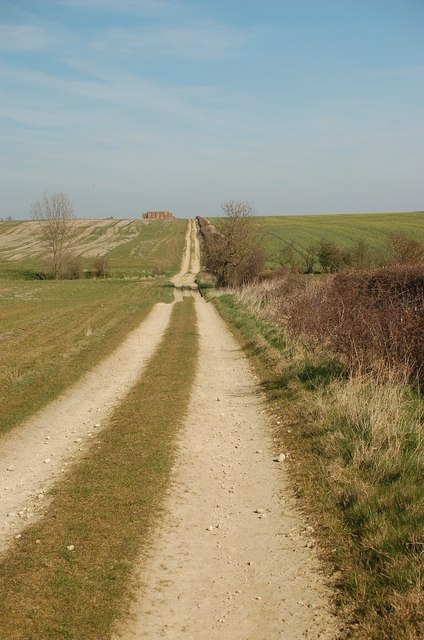
View up to the A1 near Temple Hill

The parish is one of Lincolnshire's Knights Templar preceptories. Temple Hill was investigated by the Society for Medieval Archaeology in 2002.

== Lincolnshire preceptories ==
Until their disbandment in 1312, the Knights Templar were major landowners on the higher lands of Lincolnshire, where they had a number of preceptories on property which provided income, while Temple Bruer was an estate on the Lincoln Heath, believed to have been used also for military training. The preceptories from which the Lincolnshire properties were managed were:

- Aslackby Preceptory, Kesteven (TF0830)
- Bottesford, Lindsey (SE8907)
- Eagle, Kesteven (SK875672)
- Great Limber, Lindsey (TA1308)
- Horkstow, Lindsey (SE9818)
- Witham Preceptory, Kesteven (SK928205)
- Temple Bruer, Kesteven (TF0054)
- Willoughton Preceptory, Lindsey (SK923931)
- Byard's Leap (SK990494) was part of the Temple Bruer estate.

== Community ==
The village focuses on two centres: around the church and around the former MOD housing estate.

The ecclesiastical parish South Witham is part of the Witham Group of the Deanery of Beltisloe in the Diocese of Lincoln. The incumbent is the Revd Dr Tom Broadbent.

The village primary school is in Water Lane. The school's 2011 Ofsted rating was Grade 2 (good). Older children are bussed out of the village to school.

The village magazine, Witham Word, is published monthly on the web.

The village used to be the terminus of the No. 28 bus route from Grantham, which provides a daily service. In 2024 the service was extended to also serve Stamford

== Notable people ==
- John Butt (sport shooter), Olympic shooter, born in the village in 1850, won the team bronze in the 1908 Olympics, and the team silver in 1912 Olympics, in clay pigeon shooting
- Richard Lluellyn, father of General Sir Richard Lluellyn (1781- 7 December 1867), of the 39th (Dorsetshire) Regiment of Foot; the General's great-grandfather Martin Lluellyn, had married Elizabeth Halford, the niece of Rutland MP Richard Halford
- Elizabeth Mitchell, mother of Rutland MP Richard Halford (1662–1742)
- Eric Simms (ornithologist), the first person in Britain to record on magnetic tape, and presented The Countryside Programme, which continued for 38 years, starting on the BBC Light Programme in March 1952

== See also ==
- Blue pubs
