= Byard's Leap =

Hamlet in the North Kesteven district of Lincolnshire, England

Coordinates: 53.032730°N 0.525150°W

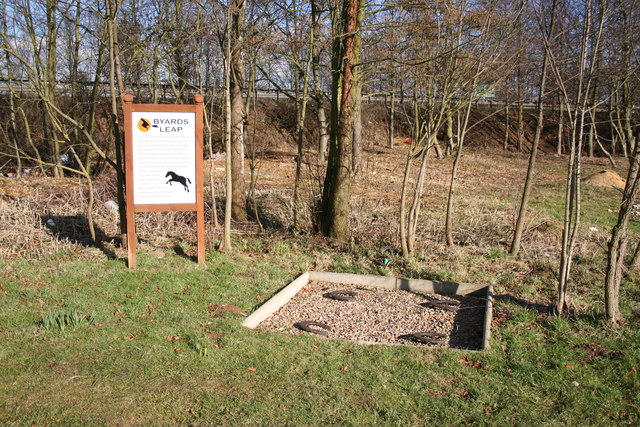
- Byard's Leap

- Location within Lincolnshire
- OS grid reference: SK990494
  - London: 105 mi (169 km) S
- Civil parish: Cranwell, Brauncewell and Byard's Leap
- District: North Kesteven
- Shire county: Lincolnshire
- Region: East Midlands
- Country: England
- Sovereign state: United Kingdom
- Post town: Sleaford
- Postcode district: NG34
- Police: Lincolnshire
- Fire: Lincolnshire
- Ambulance: East Midlands
- UK Parliament: Sleaford and North Hykeham

Byard's Leap is a hamlet in the civil parish of Cranwell, Brauncewell and Byard's Leap, in the North Kesteven district of Lincolnshire, England. It is situated approximately 3 miles (5 km) west from Cranwell. The hamlet is associated with various legends.

Byard's Leap is associated with the activities of the Knights Templar, who perhaps held tournaments and jousts on the site. It lay at the southern end of their Temple Bruer military training ground.

== History ==
Bayard Leap was formerly an extra-parochial tract. In 1858 Byards Leap became a separate civil parish, then on 1 April 1931 the parish was abolished and merged with Cranwell to form Cranwell and Byards Leap. In 1921 the parish had a population of 21.

== Geography ==
The main A17 passes east–west. At the main T-junction, the former junction was improved in the mid-1960s. It cost £50,000, and construction started in August 1965, to take six months, being built by Kesteven council staff. The new straighter junction was built by February 1966.

== Legend ==
The story, re-told by Ethel Rudkin, states there was a witch called Old Meg, an evil crone who plagued the local villagers from her cave or hut in a spinney near the turning to Sleaford on Ermine Street, here called High Dike. She was a bane of the countryside and caused the crops to whither. A local champion, a retired soldier, came forward in response to the villagers' requests, and he asserted that he could kill her by driving a sword through her heart. To select a horse suitable for this task, he went to a pond where horses drank and dropped a stone in the pond, selecting the horse that reacted quickest, and this horse was known locally as 'Blind Byard', as he was blind.

The champion went to the witch's cave and called her out, but the witch refused, saying she was eating and he would have to wait. However, she crept up behind him and sank her long nails into the horse who ran, leaping over 60 feet (18 m). The champion regained control of the horse when they reached the pond, pursued by the witch, where he turned and thrust his sword into her heart, and she fell into the pond and drowned.

The spot where Blind Byard landed is marked by four posts in the ground with horseshoes on, and a commemorative stone. The sharply-cut small valley in the limestone, which is now smoothed over by ploughing, is as likely a site as any for the dramatic events, assuming they happened. An aerial photograph shows the High Dike running north and south in the centre, RAF Cranwell is to the east and the valley lies between them. Byard's Leap is at the south centre.

The magical horse Bayard appears in several continental medieval romances.

A slightly different telling of the story can be found in Christopher Marlowe's book, Legends of the Fenland People (1926).

A 1973 folk song by the band Decameron told the legend of Byard's Leap.

== Lincolnshire preceptories ==
Until their disbandment in 1312, the Knights Templar were major landowners on the higher lands of Lincolnshire, where they had a number of preceptories on property which provided income, while Temple Bruer was an estate on the Lincoln Heath, believed to have been used also for military training. The preceptories from which the Lincolnshire properties were managed were:

- Aslackby Preceptory, Kesteven (TF0830)
- Bottesford, Lindsey (SE8907)
- Eagle, Kesteven (SK875672)
- Great Limber, Lindsey (TA1308)
- Horkstow, Lindsey (SE9818)
- Witham Preceptory, Kesteven (SK928205)
- Temple Bruer, Kesteven (TF0054)
- Willoughton Preceptory, Lindsey (SK923931)
- Byard's Leap (SK990494) was part of the Temple Bruer estate.
