= Temple Bruer Preceptory =

Historic building in Lincolnshire, England

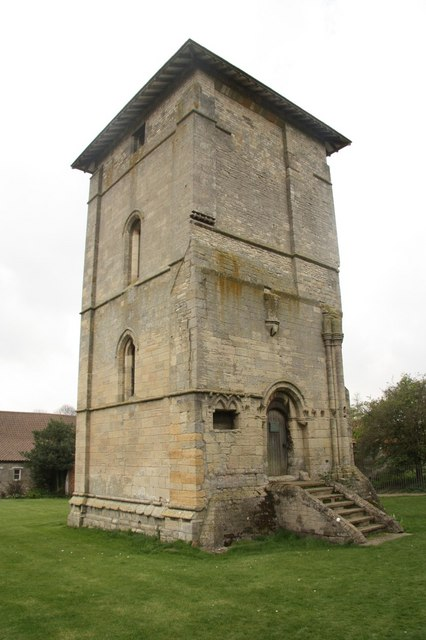
- Temple Bruer Preceptory

- Location in Lincolnshire
- 53.0711°N 0.4962°W
- Location: The preceptory is sited in the farmyard of the former Temple Bruer Farm.
- OS grid reference: TF0085153709

History
- Founded: c1150
- Demolished: After 1536

Site notes
- Architectural style: Early English architecture

Listed Building – Grade I
- Official name: Church Tower to the North of Temple Farmhouse
- Designated: 1 February 1967
- Reference no.: 1254328

Scheduled monument
- Official name: Remains of preceptory church, Temple Bruer
- Designated: 13 December 1929
- Reference no.: 1007686

Temple Bruer Preceptory is a historic building in the civil parish of Temple Bruer with Temple High Grange, North Kesteven, Lincolnshire, England. It is one of the few Knights Templar sites left in England where any ruins remain standing. Its name comes from its Templar ownership and its position in the middle of the Lincoln Heath, bruyère (heather) from the French language current at the time. It was founded in the period 1150 to 1160 and the order was dissolved in 1312. The site is located between the A15 and A607 roads, 2.5 miles (4.0 km) north from Cranwell. The site has been excavated twice, firstly by the Rev Dr. G. Oliver, the rector of Scopwick in 1832–3, and in 1908 by Sir William St John Hope.

== Foundation and history ==
The preceptory of Temple Bruer was founded late in the reign of Henry II (1154–89), This date is based on the grant of a market by Henry II to William of Ashby de la Launde, who was admitted soon afterwards into the fraternity of the preceptory; he increased the original endowment before his death. Other benefactors were Maud de Cauz, John d'Eyncourt, Robert of Everingham, William de Vescy, and Gilbert of Ghent. The house seems to have been of considerable size and importance; the brethren were allowed to crenellate the great gate in 1306. Following the suppression of the order of Knights Templar in France, Edward II followed in 1308 by sending John de Cormel, the sheriff of Lincolnshire, with 12 knights and their forces to arrest the Templars at Temple Bruer Preceptory. These included William de More, the Preceptor and Grand Master of the order in England. For a time they were held in the Clasketgate in Lincoln before being sent to the Tower of London. The order was totally suppressed by Pope Clement V in 1312, with the instruction that the Templar properties were to be transferred to the Knights Hospitallers. It took until the 1330s for the Hospitallers to recover the estates from the English King.

Following the death of Sir John Babington in 1534, Sir Giles Russell was made commander at Temple Bruer. His letters show that he did not reside at Temple Bruer; but finding that the house was in a ruinous condition he made some effort to get it repaired and put it in a better condition. In 1539 Russell was made turcopolier, of the Order and being at the time in Malta, he probably saw little of his commandery before its dissolution in 1541.

== The lands of the preceptory ==
The original endowment included lands in Ashby de la Launde, with the parish church and pasturage for sheep; lands and church at Rowston, Heckington, Burton, and were granted by benefactors of the twelfth and thirteenth centuries. In 1338 the revenue of the house was £177 7s. 7d., including the churches of Ashby and Rowston, the free chapel of Bruere, with lands at Bruere, Rowston, Wellingore, Ashby de la Launde, Brauncewell, and North Kirkby; the expenses were £84 0s. 2d. The clear value of the house at the dissolution was £16 19s. 10¾d., including the bailiwick of South Witham and the farm of half the rectory and the grange of Holme in Heckington, with perquisites of a court.

Maurice Beresford and John Hurst listed "Bruer" as a deserted medieval village in their definitive work. This lay to the south in a dry valley. An aerial photograph suggests that it was a walled enclosure with a gatehouse.

== Remaining site ==
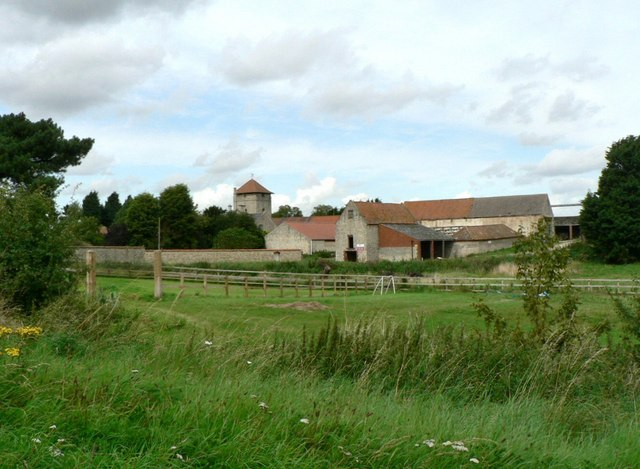
Temple farm buildings and preceptory tower from the southeast

The ruin consists of the intact square south tower of the temple church, one of two added to the original structure during the Templars' tenure, north and south of the chancel or presbytery. The preceptory tower, formerly looked after by Heritage Lincolnshire, is currently in the care of Lincolnshire County Council.

The farmhouse which stands to the south of the tower was built in the 1840s for Charles Chaplin of Blankney Hall. It is likely that it was designed by the architect William Adams Nicholson, who acted as estate architect for Charles Chaplin.

== Excavations ==
=== 1833 excavations ===
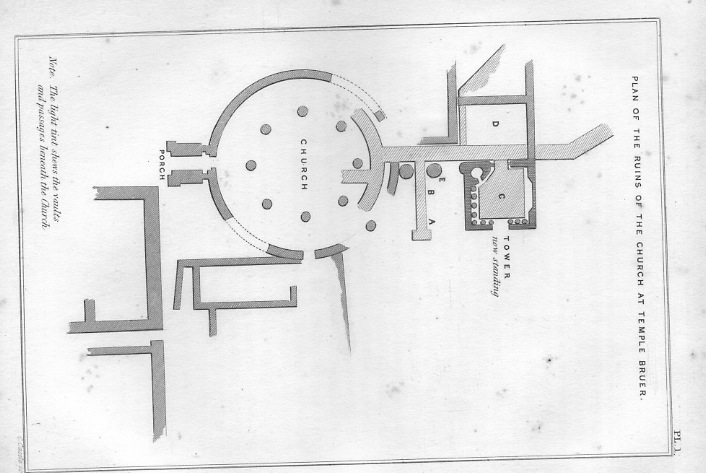
Temple Bruer Preceptory plan by Oliver, oriented east–west

Rev Dr George Oliver Temple Brewer and its Knights
I would describe the in the caverns of Temple Bruer, when I excavated in 1833.....
Some of these vaults were appropriated to purposes that it is revolting to allude to. In one of them a niche or cell was discovered which had been carefully walled up; and within it the skeleton of a man, who appears to have died in a sitting posture, for his head and arms were found hanging between his legs, and the back bowed forward. Immuring was not an uncommon punishment in these places; and an instance of it was discovered a century ago, in one of the walls at Thornton Abbey, in this county. Another skeleton of an aged man was found in these dungeons, with only one tooth in his head. His body seems to have been thrown down, as if from a trap door; for he lay doubled up; and in the fore part of his skull were two holes which had evidently been produced by violence. ([Footnote] In the corner of one of these vaults, I found plain indications of burning. The wall stones had assumed the colour of brick, and great quantities of cinders were mixed with human sculls and bones, all of which had been submitted to the operation of fire, and some of them were perfectly calcined. This horrible cavern had been closed up with masonry.) Underneath the cloisters, between the church and the tower, many human bones were discovered which appear to have been thrown together in the utmost confusion, and lying at different depths; some being very near the surface. Amongst these were the skeleton of a very young child; and the skull of an adult, with a round hole in the upper part, into which a little finger might be inserted, and which was probably the cause of death. Several large square stones were taken up with rings attached; and altogether the ruins exhibited symptoms of violence. We can scarcely forebear entertaining the opinion that these are the remains of unhappy persons who had been confined in the dungeons of the Preceptory, for the Templars were forever at feud with their neighbours; and, as they possessed the powers of executing criminals within their own liberties, they would not be very likely to remit, what they might conceive to be the merited punishment of delinquency.

— A Selection of Papers relative to the County of Lincoln, read before the Lincolnshire Topographical Society, 1841,1842. Lincoln 1843 pp.82-3

In 1833 Rev. Dr. Oliver was allowed to excavate the site by Charles Chaplin of Blankney Hall, who had recently acquired the Temple Bruer estates. Oliver remarks: "The present proprietor, Charles Chaplin Esq. of Blankney, has evinced a laudable anxiety to preserve the present Tower from ruin, by the introduction of a new roof, and by securing the cracks and fissures in the walls." Oliver's account of his excavations paints a lurid account of the discoveries and would appear to be supporting a justification for the charges which were brought against the Lincolnshire Knights Templars who were brought to trial first in Lincoln in November 1309 and later in London in 1310. Subsequent excavation in 1908 showed that Oliver's excavation had misinterpreted the features of the Preceptory and it is possible that Oliver may have encountered skeletons from a charnel house in his excavations. It was also shown that part of the passage system described by Oliver was a crypt and the "horrible cavern", the stones of which "had assumed the colour of brick" was a medieval oven structure

=== 1908 excavations ===
In 1908 William St John Hope, together with Col. Reeve of Leadenham Hall, and with the permission of Lord Londesborough, the owner, undertook extensive excavations on the site. Hope was a leading medieval archaeologist of the period and Assistant Secretary of the Society of Antiquaries.

Hope appears to have identified part of the precinct wall to the west of the church as that which was authorised by the 1306 licence to crenellate, which referred to "a certain part and strong gate" and which was noted in the 1338 Extent as a curtilagio. He also discovered a number of slight structures the south wall of the precinct, which were probably the henhouse and stables mentioned in the Extent. A larger building lay to the south of the church. This was 36m long and 11.5m wide, and was probably a barn. Hope was able to distinguish four phases of the development of the Preceptory. The first phase was the church with a round nave, about 15m in diameter, with a ring of eight columns, which distinguished a central area from an outer aisle. To the east was a rectangular presbytery of two bays measuring about 8m by 4m, with an apse at the east end. Below this lay a crypt, which may be the feature shown in the bottom left-hand corner of Samuel Buck 1726 engraving of the Preceptory. No clear indication was found of the fenestration except at the east end of the apse; and there was no clear point of access to the nave, though this may have lain on the north side where outside several rock cut graves into the local limestone, were recorded. This first phase appears to equate with the initial foundation of the preceptory in the mid-12th century.

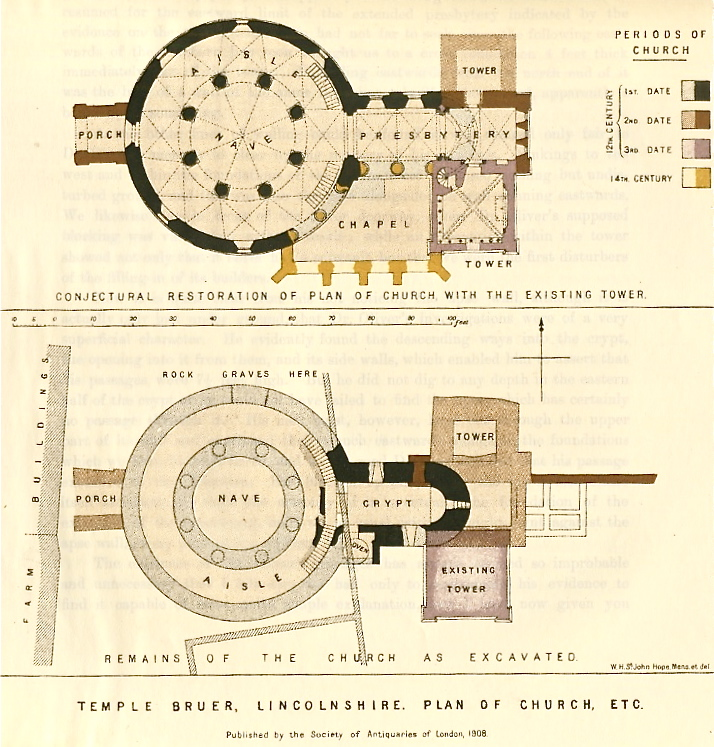
St John Hope's plans showing the phases and the crypt below the presbytery

The second phase dates from the later 12th century. A porch was constructed at the west end. The apse was removed and the presbytery extended two further bays to the east. This was followed by a third phase when towers were added to either side of the extended presbytery. A similar arrangement was adopted at the nearby Aslackby Preceptory. The northern tower survived as foundations, while the southern tower remains to its full height. Access to the ground floor of the tower is from the north and would formerly have communicated into the presbytery. To the east of the door are the remains of a double piscina which would have served the high altar. Above the door is a corbel that supported the rib vault of the presbytery roof; while to the right is the triple-shafted respond of the south side of the chancel arch. The ground floor room of the tower is a rib-vaulted chamber with windows in three sides. This room has an impressive blind arcade on its west and south sides, with a stone bench beneath. This bench has had incorporated a double sedilia and piscina. There is a further chamber above, reached by a spiral staircase. The fourth or final phase of building was the addition, revealed as foundations on the south side, of a chapel. The roof line of this chapel can be clearly seen on the west face of the standing tower. The photographs published by Hope show that ruinous elements of the upper parts of the tower were extensively repaired at a later date.

== Gallery ==
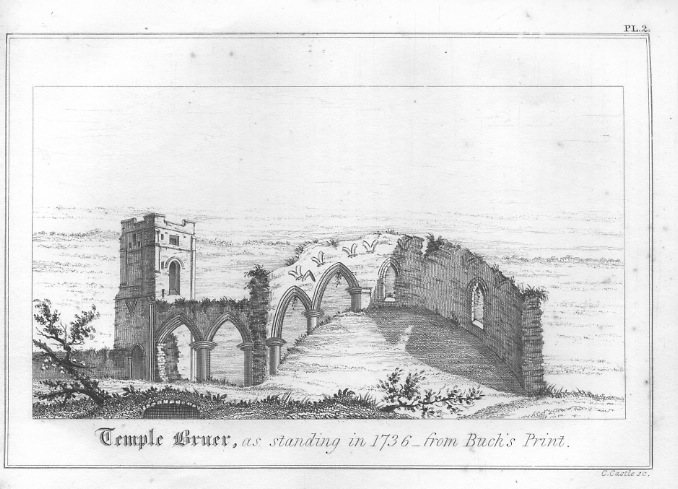
Temple Bruer Preceptory by Samuel Buck

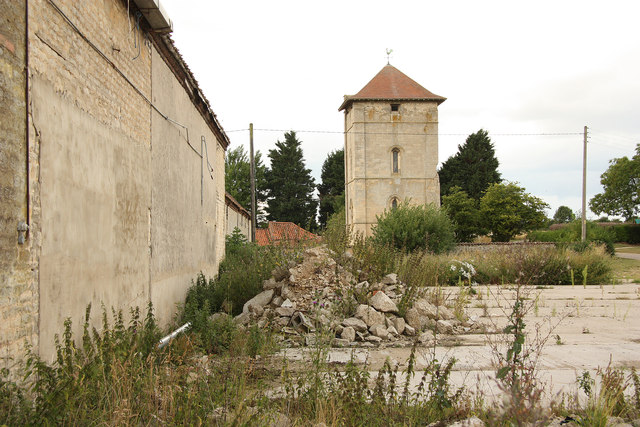
Preceptory tower

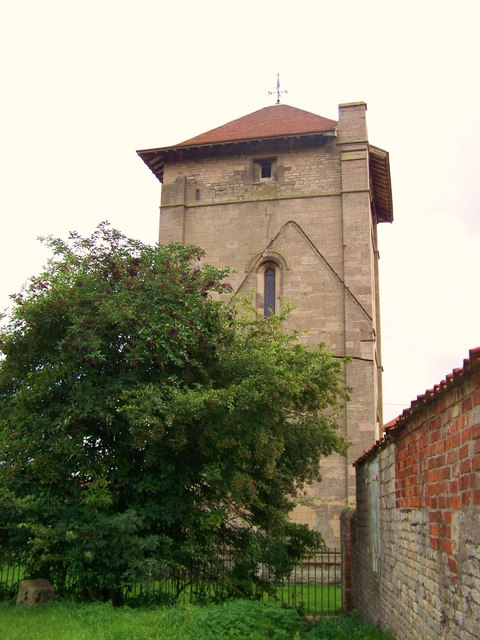
Tower and outbuilding at Temple Bruer

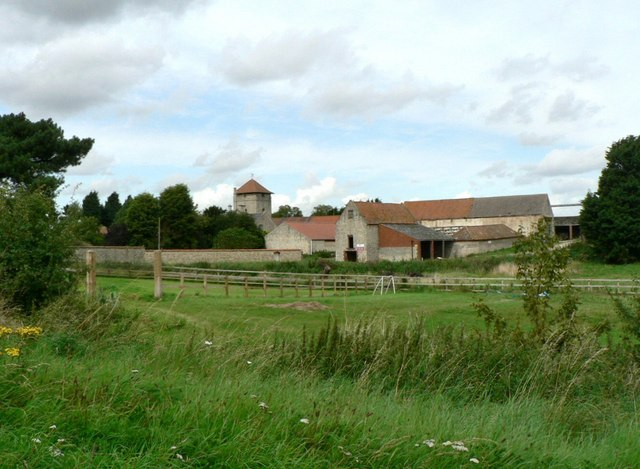
Temple farm at Temple Bruer

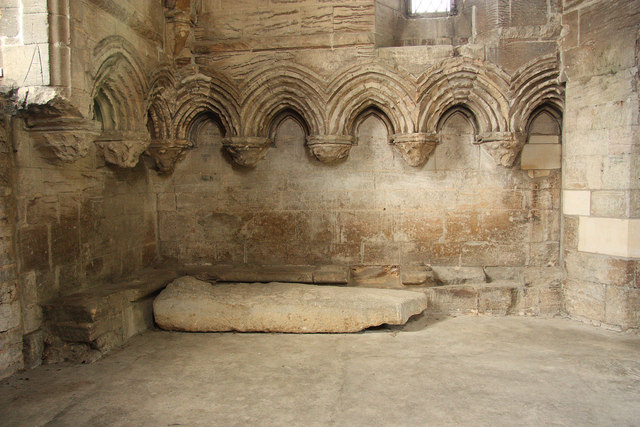
Preceptory tower interior

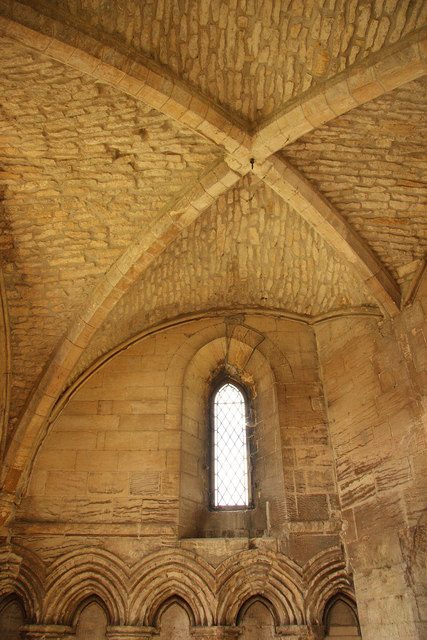
Preceptory tower vaulting

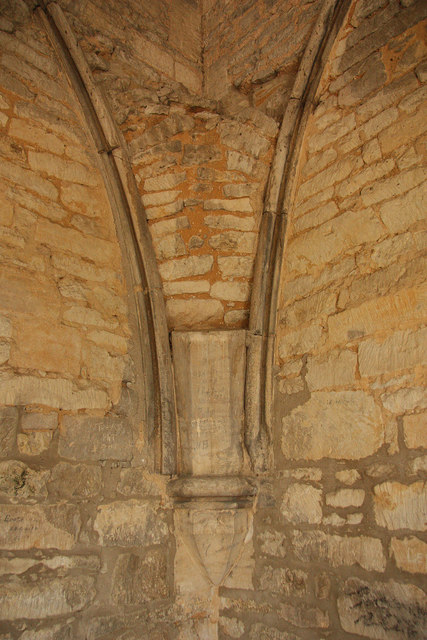
Springer for vaulting

== See also ==
- List of Templar sites in Lincolnshire

== Bibliography ==
- Antram N (revised), Pevsner N & Harris J, (1989), The Buildings of England: Lincolnshire, Yale University Press.
- Charles G. Addison The History of the Knights Templars (1997) ISBN 0932813402
- Larking, L B. and Kemble, J. M (1857), The Knights Hospitallers in England: Being a Report of the Prior Philip de Thame to the Grand Master Elyan de Villanova for A.D. 1338 Camden Society, pp. 153–156
- Mills, D. The Knights Templar in Kesteven North Kesteven District Council (c.1990)
- Oliver G. Rev.Dr.(1843) Temple Bruer and its Knights, in A selection of Papers relative to the County of Lincoln read before the Lincolnshire Topographical Society 1841,1842. pp. 67–90, W & B Brooke, High Street, Lincoln.
- Sister Elspeth (1906) in Page, William,(ed). A History of the County of Lincoln Volume 2. Victoria County History. pp. 210–213 Houses of Knights Templars: Willoughton, Eagle, Aslackby, South Witham and Temple Bruer.
- St John Hope, W.H. (1908) The Round Church of the Knights Templar at Temple Bruer, Lincolnshire in Archaeologia, LXL, 177–198
- White, A. The Knights Templar of at Temple Bruer and Aslackby, Lincolnshire Museums Archaeology Series No.25. (1981)
