= List of Templar sites in Lincolnshire =

Until their disbandment in 1312, the Knights Templar were major landowners on the higher lands of Lincolnshire, England, where they had a number of preceptories on property which provided income, while Temple Bruer was an estate on the Lincoln Heath, believed to have been used also for military training.

== Preceptories ==
- Aslackby Preceptory, Kesteven (TF0830)
- Eagle, Kesteven (SK875672)
- Temple Bruer Preceptory
- Witham Preceptory, Kesteven (SK928205)
- Willoughton Preceptory, Lindsey (SK923931)

== Camerae and granges ==
- Bottesford Preceptory, Lindsey. Cell of Willougton(SE8907)
- Temple Belwood, Belton, North Lincolnshire
- Grantham Angel and Royal
- Gainsborough, Lincolnshire
- Great Limber, Lindsey (TA1308)
- Horkstow, Lindsey (SE9818) Cell of Willoughton
- Mere, Branston and Mere. Probably a grange of Willoughton
