= Great Limber Priory, Limber Magna =

Priory in Great Limber, Lincolnshire, England

Coordinates: 53.5607°N 0.2830°W

Great Limber Priory, Limber Magna was a priory in Great Limber (or Limber Magna), Lincolnshire, England.

The manor and church of Great Limber were granted by Richard de Humet, constable of Normandy, France, and Agnes his wife, to the Cistercian abbey of Aunay in Normandy, and their charter was confirmed by King Henry II in 1157. It is uncertain whether it was a priory or a grange. The manor and church were sold by the abbot of Aunay in 1393 to the priory of St. Anne at Coventry.

see also

- Great Limber Preceptory, Limber Magna
