= Eagle Barnsdale =

Hamlet in the North Kesteven district of Lincolnshire, England

Coordinates: 53.176715°N 0.68197°W

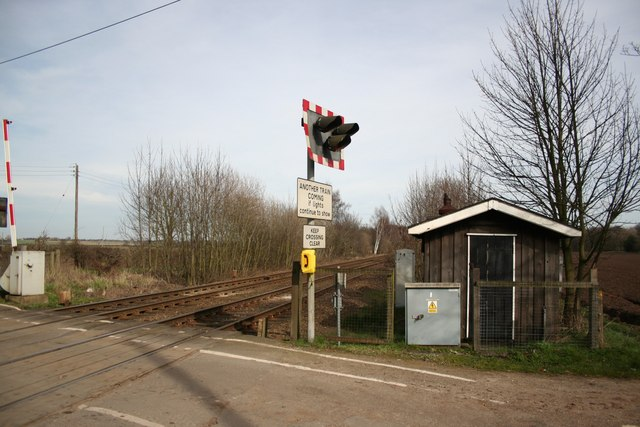
- Eagle Barnsdale level crossing

- Location within Lincolnshire
- OS grid reference: SK881652
  - London: 115 mi (185 km) S
- Unitary authority: North Kesteven
- Ceremonial county: Lincolnshire
- Region: East Midlands
- Country: England
- Sovereign state: United Kingdom
- Post town: Lincoln
- Postcode district: LN6
- Police: Lincolnshire
- Fire: Lincolnshire
- Ambulance: East Midlands
- UK Parliament: Sleaford and North Hykeham (UK Parliament constituency)

Eagle Barnsdale is a hamlet in the North Kesteven district of Lincolnshire, England. The population can be found included in the civil parish of Eagle and Swinethorpe. It is situated approximately 7 miles (11 km) south-east from the city and county town of Lincoln. The village of Eagle is to the north, with Morton Hall to the south.
