= Adrian Scrope (Royalist) =

English politician

Sir Adrian Scrope or Scroope (c. 1616–1666) of Cockerington, Lincolnshire was an English politician who sat in the House of Commons from 1661 to 1666. He was a Royalist officer in the English Civil War.

== Biography ==
Scrope was the son of Sir Gervase Scrope of Cockerington and his first wife Catherine Hungerford, daughter of John Hungerford of Chisbury, Wiltshire. He was educated at Westminster School and was admitted at St John's College, Cambridge on 18 May 1632, aged 16. He entered Lincoln's Inn in 1634. At the start of the civil war his father raised a regiment for King Charles I, and was left for dead at Edgehill, where he received sixteen wounds, but survived to 1655.

Adrian Scrope was a Gentleman of the privy chamber from 1641 to 1646. He served in the king's army as a Colonel of horse during the civil war from 1642 to 1646. The fine imposed on father and son for their delinquency amounted to over £6,000.

After the Restoration of the Monarchy he was made Knight of the Bath on 23 April 1661 at the coronation of Charles II. In 1661, he was elected Member of Parliament for Great Grimsby in the Cavalier Parliament. He served as captain in the Earl of Cleveland's Horse from 1662 to his death.

He died in 1666.

== Family ==
Scrope married Mary Carr, daughter of Sir Robert Carr, 2nd Baronet of Sleaford, and was the father of Sir Carr Scrope.

== Notes ==
Parliament of England
Preceded by William Wray; Edward King	Member of Parliament for Great Grimsby; 1661–1666; With: Gervase Holles	Succeeded by Gervase Holles; Sir Henry Belasyse
