= Carr Scrope =

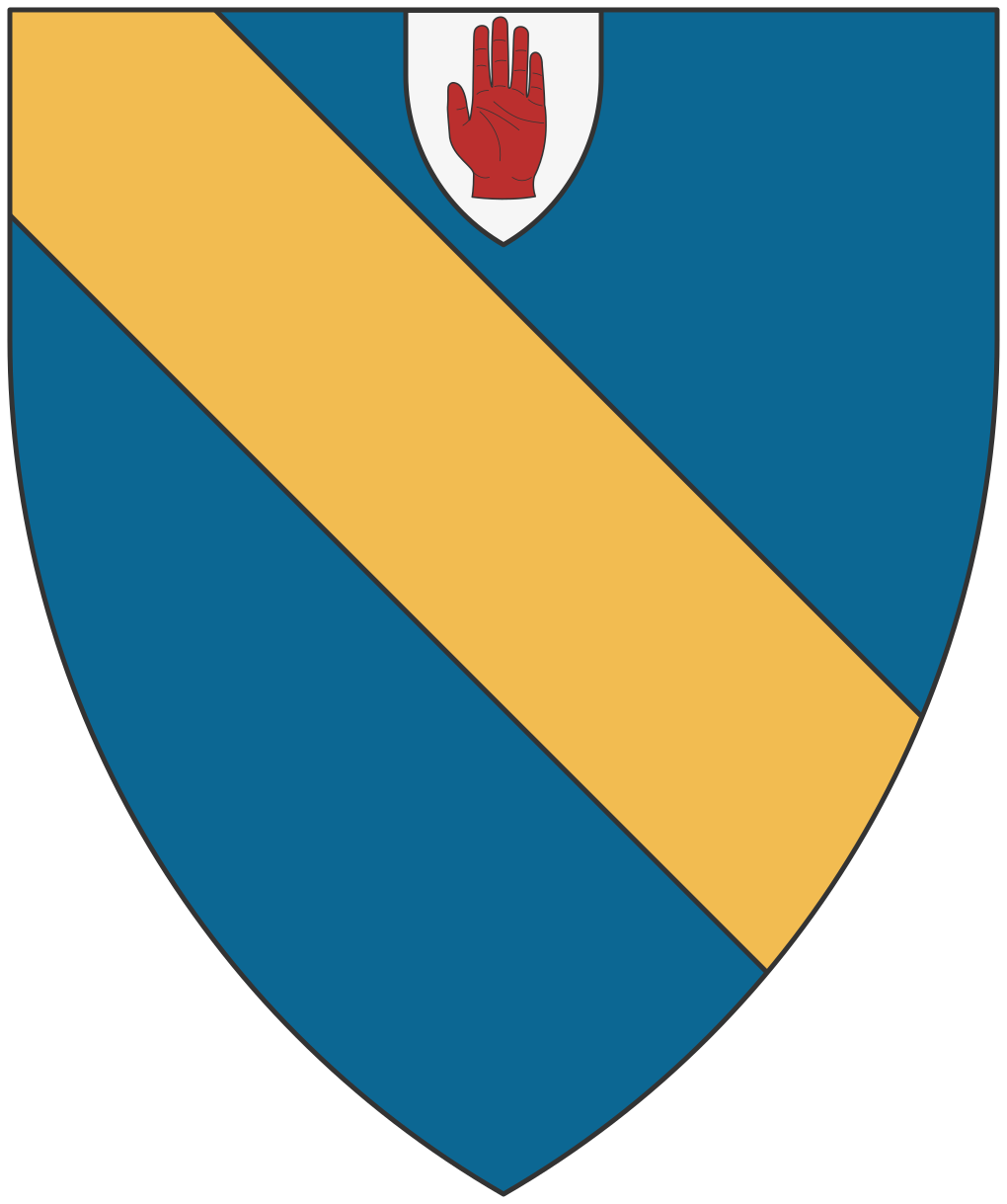
Arms of Scrope of Cockerington

Sir Carr Scrope, 1st Baronet (20 September 1649 – 1680), versifier and man of fashion in the Restoration court of Charles II of England.

== Biography ==
Scrope was the son of Sir Adrian Scrope and Mary Carr, daughter of Sir Robert Carr, of Sleaford. He matriculated from Wadham College, Oxford, on 26 August 1664, being entered as a fellow-commoner on 3 September. He was created MA on 4 February 1667. On 16 January 1667 he was created a Baronet, of Cockerington in the County of Lincoln.

Scrope came to London, and was soon numbered among the companions of Charles II and the wits "who wrote with ease". About November 1676 he was in love with Miss Fraser, lady-in-waiting to the Duchess of York; but her extravagance in dress—one of her costumes is said to have cost no less than £300—so frightened him that he changed his matrimonial intentions. In January of the next year Catherine Sedley (afterwards Countess of Dorchester) quarrelled with him in the queen's drawing-room over some lampoon that she believed him to have written. Scrope fancied himself ridiculed as "the purblind knight" in Earl of Rochester's Allusion to the Tenth Satire of the First Book of Horace, and attacked his rival in a very free and satirical poem in defence of satire, an imitation of Horace. Rochester retorted with a vigorous lampoon, which is printed in his works, and Scrope made in reply a very severe epigram. Many references to Scrope (he was a man of small stature, and often ridiculed for his meanness of size) appeared in the satires of the period. He was a member of the "Green Ribbon Club", the great Whig club, which met at the King's Head tavern over against the Inner Temple Gate.

In 1679 Scrope was living at the north end of the east side of Duke Street, St. James's, Westminster. and in August of the next year he was at Tunbridge Wells for his health, and with "a physician of his own". He is said to have died in November 1680, and to have been buried at St. Martin's-in-the-Fields; the baronetcy thereupon became extinct.

== Family ==
Carr Scrope was eldest son of Sir Adrian Scrope of Cockerington, Lincolnshire, a Cavalier and knight of the Bath (d. 1667). His mother, Mary, daughter of Sir Robert Carr of Sleaford in the same county, died in 1685, and was noted in her day "for making sharp speeches and doing startling things".

== Bibliography ==
A translation by Scrope of the epistle of Sappho to Phaon was inserted in Ovid's Epistles translated by Various Hands, numerous editions of which were issued between 1681 and 1725, and it was reprinted in Nichols's Collection of Poems.

Other renderings of Ovid by Scrope are in the Miscellany Poems of 1684.

Scrope He wrote the prologue to Sir George Etherege's Man of Mode, a song which was inserted in that play, and the prologue to Lee's Rival Queens.

Scrope's song of Myrtillo's Sad Despair, in Lee's Mithridates, is included in Ritson's English Songs, and the song in the Man of Mode is inserted in the same volume.

A satirical piece, called A very heroical Epistle from my Lord All-pride to Dol-Common (1679), preserved in the Roxburghe Collection of Ballads at the British Museum (iii. 819), and printed by Mr. Ebsworth in the fourth volume (pp. 575–576) of his collection, is supposed to have been written by Scrope.

== Notes ==
Baronetage of England
New creation	Baronet (of Cockerington); 1667–1680	Extinct
