= Bloxholm =

Village in Lincolnshire, England

Coordinates: 53.067860°N 0.411975°W

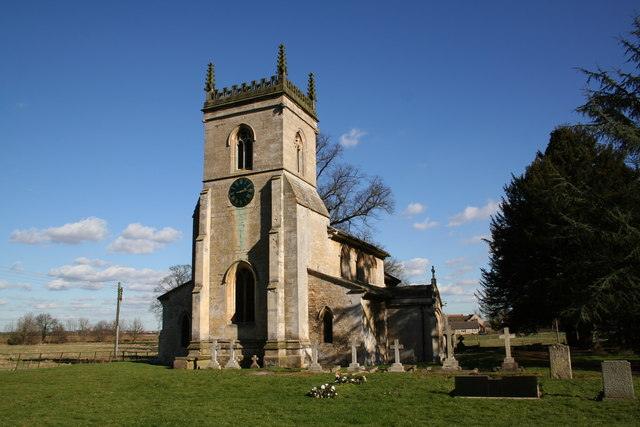
- Church of St Mary, Bloxhom

- Location within Lincolnshire
- OS grid reference: TF065534
  - London: 105 mi (169 km) S
- Civil parish: Ashby de la Launde and Bloxholm
- District: North Kesteven
- Shire county: Lincolnshire
- Region: East Midlands
- Country: England
- Sovereign state: United Kingdom
- Post town: Lincoln
- Postcode district: LN4
- Police: Lincolnshire
- Fire: Lincolnshire
- Ambulance: East Midlands
- UK Parliament: Sleaford and North Hykeham

Bloxholm is a village in the civil parish of Ashby de la Launde and Bloxholm, in the North Kesteven district of Lincolnshire, England. It is situated approximately 1 mile (1.6 km) south-west from the village of Digby.

In 1921 the parish had a population of 79. On 1 April 1931 the parish was abolished and merged with Ashby de la Launde to form "Ashby de la Launde and Bloxholm".

== Bloxholm Hall ==
Bloxholm Hall is a partially demolished early 18th-century country house of which the surviving north wing now serves as a Grade II listed farmhouse.

It was built in 1707 for Septimus Cyprian Thornton and was acquired by the Duchess of Rutland, from whom it descended to General Lord Robert Manners (1721–1782). It was enlarged in 1772 by the addition of a north wing by architect Lewis Vulliamy. It passed to his son George Manners (1763–1828), High Sheriff of Lincolnshire for 1826, who further enlarged and renovated the hall to the designs of Vulliamy, adding a stable block (now also Grade II listed). He died unmarried, leaving the estate to his great-niece Mary, who married Robert Dundas, later Robert Nisbet-Hamilton, MP and Privy Counsellor. He died in 1887 leaving an only daughter Mary Georgiana, who predeceased him, having married Henry Olgilvy. The Olgilvys had lived at one of their several Scottish homes and Bloxholm was sold.

The hall was abandoned in the 1940s and the older main wing demolished in 1963. The north wing is now a farmhouse.
