= Ashby de la Launde and Bloxholm =

Civil parish in Lincolnshire, England

Coordinates: 53.07°N 0.42°W

Ashby de la Launde and Bloxholm is a civil parish in the North Kesteven district of Lincolnshire, England. According to the 2001 Census it had a population of 796, increasing to 837 at the 2011 census. The parish includes the villages of Ashby de la Launde and Bloxholm, and the southern part of Scopwick Heath. For administrative reasons the parish council is also responsible for the adjacent parish of Temple Bruer with Temple High Grange.

== Description ==
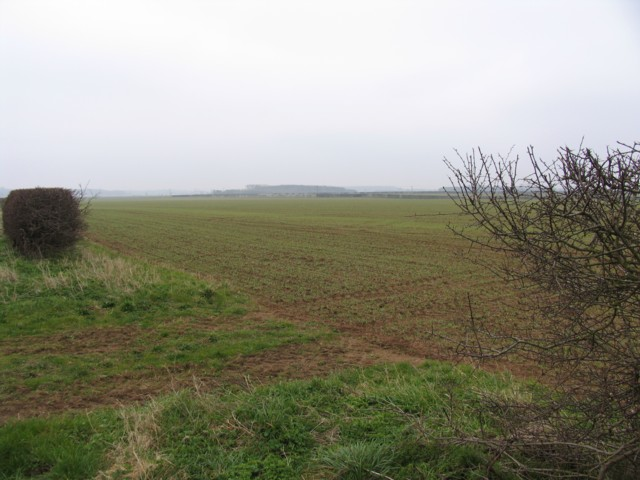
Fields near Ashby Lodge

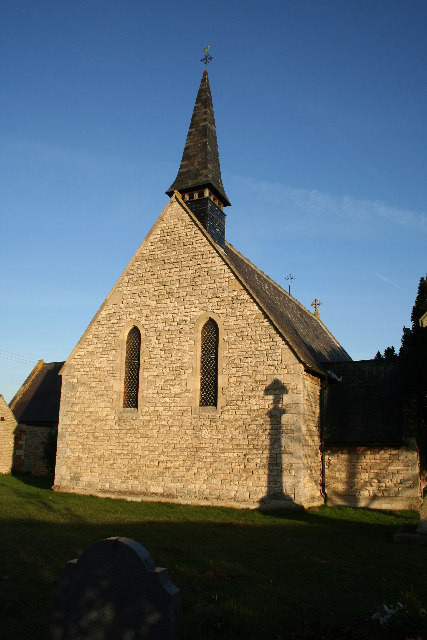
Church at Thompson's Bottom, Temple Bruer

The two parishes straddle the A15 in between Lincoln and Sleaford. The Temple Bruer parish is entirely rural, containing the farm and Knights Templar ruins to the west of the A15, and a hamlet at Thompson's bottom. The Ashby del la Launde parish contains most of the village of Ashby de la Launde and the hamlet of Bloxholm.

Ashby de la Launde is a village to the east of the A15 road, based around two centres. The first, Main Street, is centred on the church, the old Hall, and Home Farm. The second is around RAF Digby, with the associated housing and school at the junction of Heath Road and Cuckoo Lane. Cuckoo lane is the northern boundary of the parish, so only the buildings south of Cuckoo Lane are in the parish. This includes the Tedder primary school.

The western edge of the Temple parish is along the alignment of the former Roman Road of High Dyke park of Ermine Street.

== Terrain ==
The whole of the Temple Bruer parish, and the western and northern part of the Ashby parish (including that part of Scopwick heath) are on the Lincolnshire limestone, the Upper Lincolnshire Limestone. The village of Ashby de la Launde and the hamlet of Bloxholm are founded on a slightly different Limestone formation, the Cornbrash. The B1191 road past RAF Digby is the approximate delimiter. Several limestone streams arise from this area and flow east.

The Temple parish and the Scopwick heath part of the Ashby parish are around 50m above sea level, and the eastern edge of the Ashby parish dips down to the 20m line. The delimiter between the two geologies is roughly along the 30m contour.
