= Ashby de la Launde =

Village in Lincolnshire, England

Coordinates: 53.08°N 00.43°W

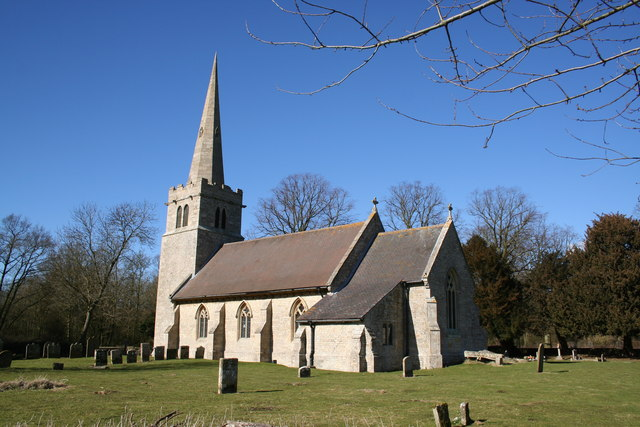
- St Hybald's Church, Ashby de la Launde

- Location within Lincolnshire
- OS grid reference: TF0555
  - London: 105 mi (169 km) S
- Civil parish: Ashby de la Launde and Bloxholm
- District: North Kesteven
- Shire county: Lincolnshire
- Region: East Midlands
- Country: England
- Sovereign state: United Kingdom
- Post town: Lincoln
- Postcode district: LN4
- Police: Lincolnshire
- Fire: Lincolnshire
- Ambulance: East Midlands
- UK Parliament: Sleaford and North Hykeham

Ashby de la Launde is a small village, part of the civil parish of Ashby de la Launde and Bloxholm, in the North Kesteven district of Lincolnshire, England. The village is situated just west of Digby, and east of the A15 and B1191 roads. In 1921 the parish had a population of 200.

== History ==
In the Domesday Book of 1086, the village is called "Ashebi", comprising two manors in the possession of Ralph Paynel and Kolsveinn of Lincoln.

The Lord of the manor, William de Essheby, (or Ashby), founded the Knights Templar preceptory Temple Bruer, around 1150, joining the order himself and increasing his endowment to it before his death. In time, the preceptory became the second wealthiest in Britain, funding the Crusades from sheep rearing and wool exports to Europe.

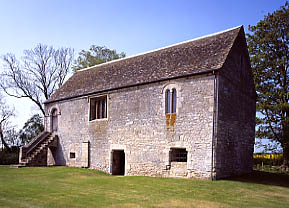
The existing manor at Boothby Pagnell resembles the original manor at Ashby de la Launde, built in 1220.

A descendant, also named William de Essheby, gave the Knights Templar the advowson of the village's church, dedicated to Saint Hybald, in return for the Templars providing, for ever more, a chaplain to perform divine service in the private chapel, dedicated to St. Margaret, in the de Essheby's manor house. This manor house, built in 1220, was 'a rectangular two-storeyed semi-fortified manor with first floor external stair access', similar in style to the surviving manor at Boothby Pagnell, Lincolnshire.

The advowson returned to the family in the 13th century, but after the death of his son, Jordan de Essherby once again gave the Church to the Templars.

In the 13th century, Cecilia, daughter of Jordan de Essheby, married Walter de la Laund (or Launde), Lord of the manor of Laceby. Upon the death of her father circa 1260, Cecilia, his sole heir, inherited the Ashby manor, and the settlement became known as Ashby de la Launde.

In the 15th century, descendant Thomas de la Launde commenced a suit against the Knights Hospitaller, who had been given many of the Templars assets after their dissolution, to regain the advowson of the church, but he died before it was completed. In 1493, another Thomas de la Launde commenced a similar suit.

The de la Laundes finally lost their land holdings in the area in the reign of Henry VIII. The King granted the manor to John Bellow and Robert Brocklesby in 1543; John Bussey then held it from 1555 until, in 1564, the estate was purchased by Thomas York. In 1580, George, the son of Thomas York, sold the estate to Edward King.

On 1 April 1931 the civil parish was abolished and merged with Bloxholm to form the parish of Ashby de la Launde and Bloxholm.

== Ashby Hall ==
Ashby Hall was built in 1595 by Edward King using the original Norman manor house as part of the foundations. It remained in the King family until the late 19th century, when it passed through the female line to Colonel William Vere Reeve King-Fane. Between the years 1814 and 1835 it was let to a Mrs Gardner as a girls' school.

The hall was home to Colonel Edward King (c 1606 – 1681) Member of Parliament for Great Grimsby, as well as to his father-in-law Sir Edward Ayscough. Colonel King was a strong supporter of Oliver Cromwell, serving as a captain in the Parliamentary army and as Governor of Boston during the Commonwealth. Despite his strong republican and nonconformist beliefs, he is credited as being the first Member of Parliament to have called for the restoration of Charles II.

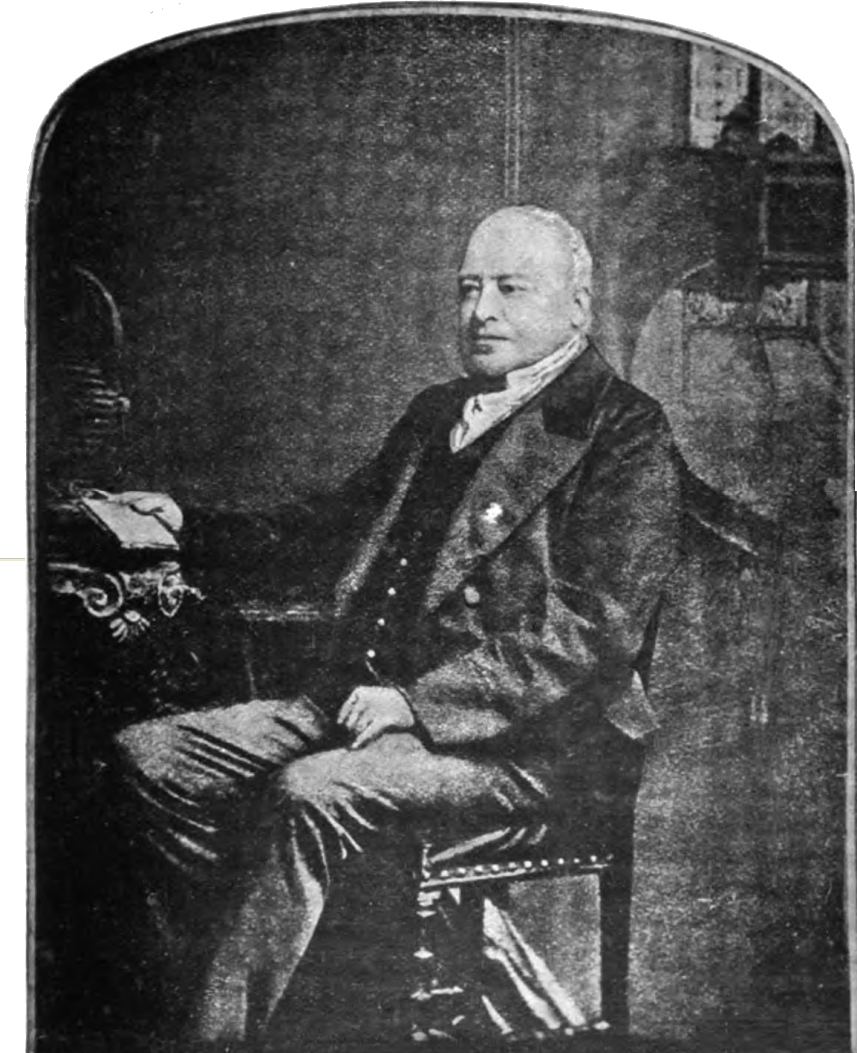
John William King, parson and racehorse breeder, was owner of Ashby Hall in 1841.

In 1841 the Hall and estate passed to John William King who was also the parson of Ashby. Now squire and parson, he took over the stables and stud and set about breeding racehorses. In 1874 his filly Apology won the Triple Crown of the Thousand Guineas, the Oaks and the St Leger. His activities came to the notice of Bishop Wordsworth of Lincoln who demanded his resignation from his church positions. King resigned a year later and died on 9 May 1875.

The Hall was sold in 1925 by Colonel William Vere Reeve King-Fane of Fulbeck to George Canning, 4th Baron Garvagh, who had sold his Irish estates in Garvagh near Londonderry and moved his family to Ashby Hall. Lord Garvagh rebuilt and modernised parts of the Hall, and during the Great Depression, to keep his staff employed, he built a large wooden indoor Badminton court which in later years became the present Village Hall; it has been relocated today in the centre of the village.

Lord Garvagh moved to Keswick at the beginning of the Second World War, and by 1942 various fighter squadrons at RAF Digby had taken over Ashby Hall as their officer's mess. One of the most notable was 609 Squadron (White Rose). By the end of the war, the house became derelict and stood empty until the estate were broken up in the late 1950s. The park was cleared of its oak trees and the walled garden and surrounding farms sold separately, leaving the Hall itself to become the Lake Rendezvous Club, featuring acts including Diana Dors, Bob Monkhouse and Ken Dodd. The Hall was purchased in 1960 by a Mr Roy Baines from Ruskington who renovated parts of the Hall. He converted it into an old fashioned Country Club calling it Ashby Hall Country Club. The facilities were swimming pool, fishing, water skiing, boating, horse riding and nightclub. Members paid an annual Fee. Roy Baines lived there with his wife June and children Carol, Jackie, Tony and Peter. The Hall and Club was purchased by the Ward family in the late 1960s under the new name Ashby Country Club, eventually closing in 1992. The Hall was then purchased to become the headquarters of a defence and security manufacturing company.

== Superfast Broadband ==
In 2010, having been told that high speed broadband was unlikely to reach Ashby De La Launde in the near future, residents brought in an external company to lay a fibre optic ring main around the village, providing access to a 100 Mbit/s connection to every home.
