= Rowston =

Village and civil parish in the North Kesteven district of Lincolnshire, England

Coordinates: 53.094071°N 0.382525°W

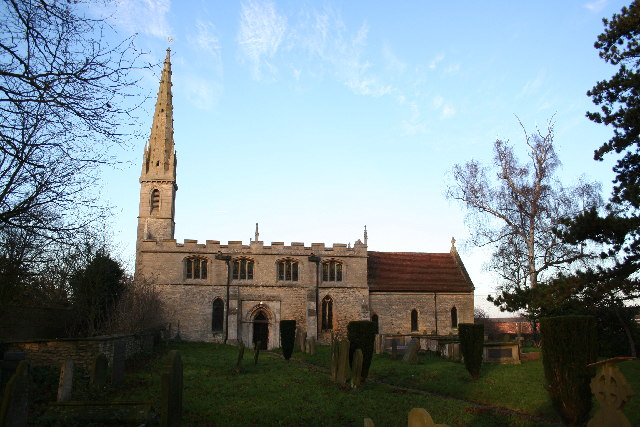
- St Clement's Church, Rowston

- Location within Lincolnshire
- Population: 178 (2011)
- OS grid reference: TF084564
  - London: 110 mi (180 km) S
- District: North Kesteven
- Shire county: Lincolnshire
- Region: East Midlands
- Country: England
- Sovereign state: United Kingdom
- Post town: Lincoln
- Postcode district: LN4
- Police: Lincolnshire
- Fire: Lincolnshire
- Ambulance: East Midlands
- UK Parliament: Sleaford and North Hykeham

Rowston is a village and civil parish in the North Kesteven district of Lincolnshire, England, situated approximately 6 miles (10 km) north from the town of Sleaford. The population of the civil parish at the 2011 census was 178.

In the 1086 Domesday Book Rowston is recorded as "Rowstune", with 34 households.

The limestone parish church is a Grade I listed building dedicated to Saint Clement and dates from the 12th century. Anglo-Saxon decorated stonework has been re-used in the south chancel wall. It was refitted in 1741 and restored 1904–10. There is a 15th-century font, and over a doorway in the tower a 12th-century tympanum decorated with a cross and other motifs.

A restored village cross stands on the green near the church and is both Grade II listed and a scheduled monument. It was restored in 1910 retaining the top step, base and shaft of the 15th-century original.

Rowston Manor is a Grade II* listed limestone house dating from 1741 with an addition in 1985.

A previous National school built here of red brick in 1852, is a Grade II listed building.
