= Ethel Rudkin =

Archaeologist

- Born: Ethel Hutchinson; 1893; Willoughton, Lincolnshire, England
- Died: 21 September 1985 (aged 91–92)
- Occupation: Folklorist
- Notable work: Lincolnshire Folklore
- Spouse: George Rudkin (m. 1917, d. 1918)
- Honours: Coote Lake Medal

Ethel Rudkin (1893 – 21 September 1985) was an English local historian, archaeologist, folklorist and archivist from Lincolnshire. She pioneered the collection of folk material, particularly from Lincolnshire, and her collections are now part of several public institutions, including the North Lincolnshire Museum.

== Early and personal life ==
Ethel Hutchinson was born in 1893 in Willoughton, Lincolnshire to parents Richard and Ethel Hutchinson. Her maternal family were originally from Suffolk. As a young woman, she was employed both as a governess and a groom by the same family.

In 1917, she married George Rudkin from Folkingham; the couple had "a blissful but tragically brief marriage until his early death in 1918". George had served as a commissioned officer in the Machine Gun Corps during the First World War and died in the influenza epidemic. He was also awarded the Military Cross. The North Lincolnshire Museum holds a handbag containing her wedding flowers and letters from him. After George's death, she returned to Willoughton to live with and care for her parents.

In later life, Lucy Arliss moved in with Rudkin, assisted her on archaeological digs and they lived together for the rest of Arliss' life. In 1972, the pair moved into a cottage in Toynton All Saints near Spilsby. Arliss died a few years later. Throughout her life, Rudkin was known to her friends by the nickname "Peter".

== Career ==
Rudkin was interested in the traditions and folklore of Lincolnshire and began to collect stories and objects that reflected those interests, against the wishes of her parents. It was during this time in the 1920s and 1930s that much of her collecting took place. In 1927, she assisted C. W. Phillips to revise ancient monuments for ordnance survey maps. In 1931 she joined The Folklore Society, where her work on Lincolnshire was encouraged, in particular by Margaret Murray. In 1936, Rudkin published her book Lincolnshire Folklore, with an introduction by Murray. In the same year, her seminal essay Black Dogs was published in the journal of the Folklore Society. Other articles included calendar customs, witches and stone-lore. Also in the 1930s, she was active in the Lincolnshire Local History Society, who were hoping to establish a county museum. In 1931–32 she excavated a medieval building close to Willoughton.

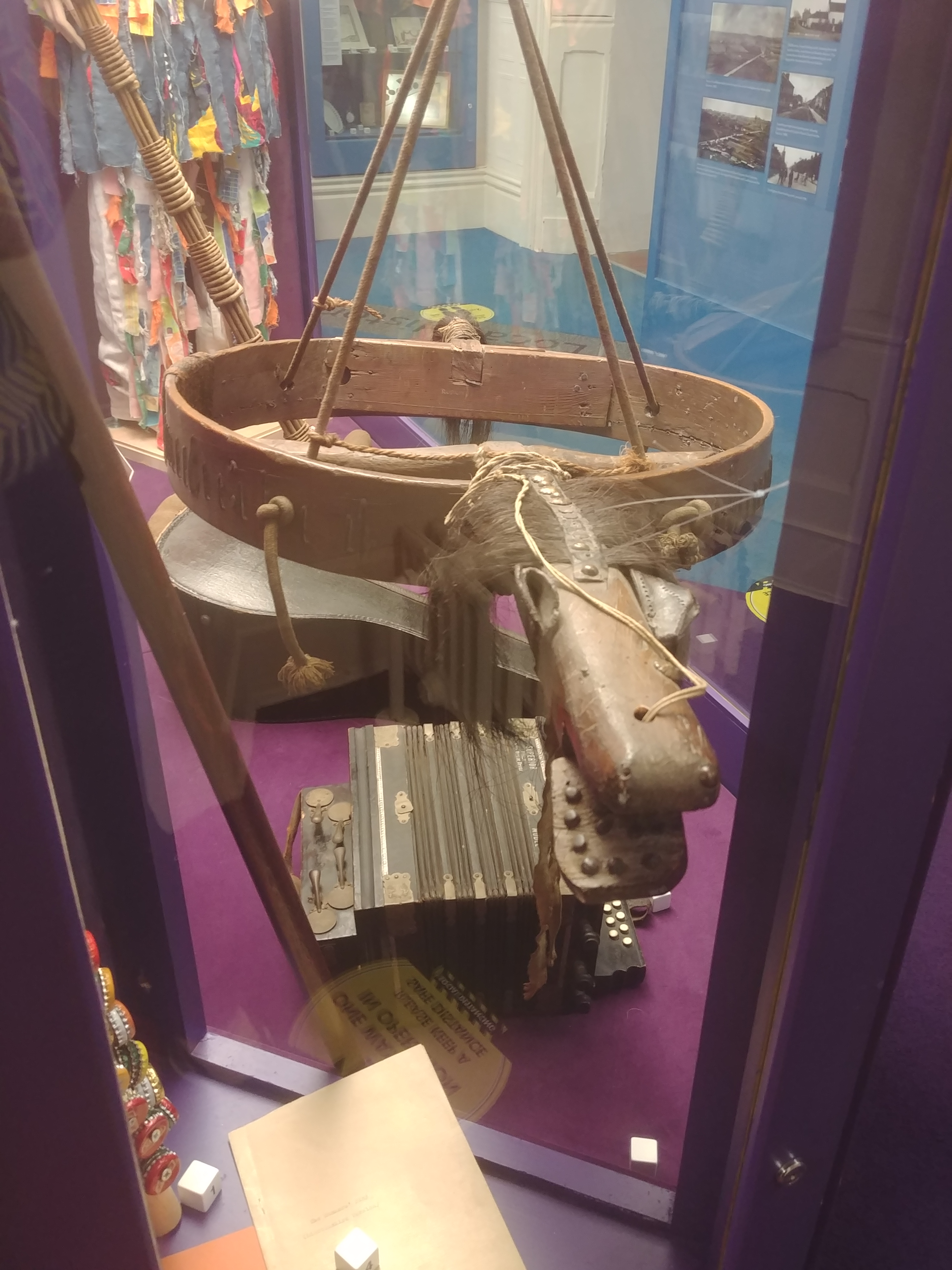
Plough jag (North Lincolnshire Museum)

Folk music was an additional interest of Rudkin's; she collaborated with Robert Pacey on A Lincolnshire Songbook. In later life, she recorded traditional songs she had learned as a child. In addition, she also collected Plough Plays, building an archive which became one of the finest in England. As well as the plays themselves, Rudkin spoke to the performers and made her own notes based on those discussions. In 1952, she published a copy of The Later Bassingham Plough Play, which she worked on from a manuscript held in the North Lincolnshire Museum.

By the 1970s, Rudkin was increasingly interested in the south Lincolnshire fens. By the time of her and Arliss' move to Toynton All Saints, Rudkin possessed such a large collection of objects that she rented a windmill to store them. She also began excavating at Eresby manor during this time, as well as the brickworks at East Keal. She also made a study of pottery and pottery kilns from Toynton All Saints and Bolingbroke.

In 1977, a weekend celebration was held in Horncastle to celebrate Rudkin's life and her contributions to the history of Lincolnshire and the study of folklore in the county. Hosting researchers was an important part of her life and many students worked with her over the years. One such student was the archaeologist Hilary Healey.

Rudkin died on 21 September 1985, aged 92.

== Reception ==
Rudkin's book Lincolnshire Folklore was not initially popular but came to be appreciated over time; when it was re-published in 1976 by E P Publishing, it sold out immediately. In 1984 A Prospect of Lincolnshire was published. This Festschrift, which honoured Rudkin's interests and scholarship, was edited by Naomi Field and Andrew White.

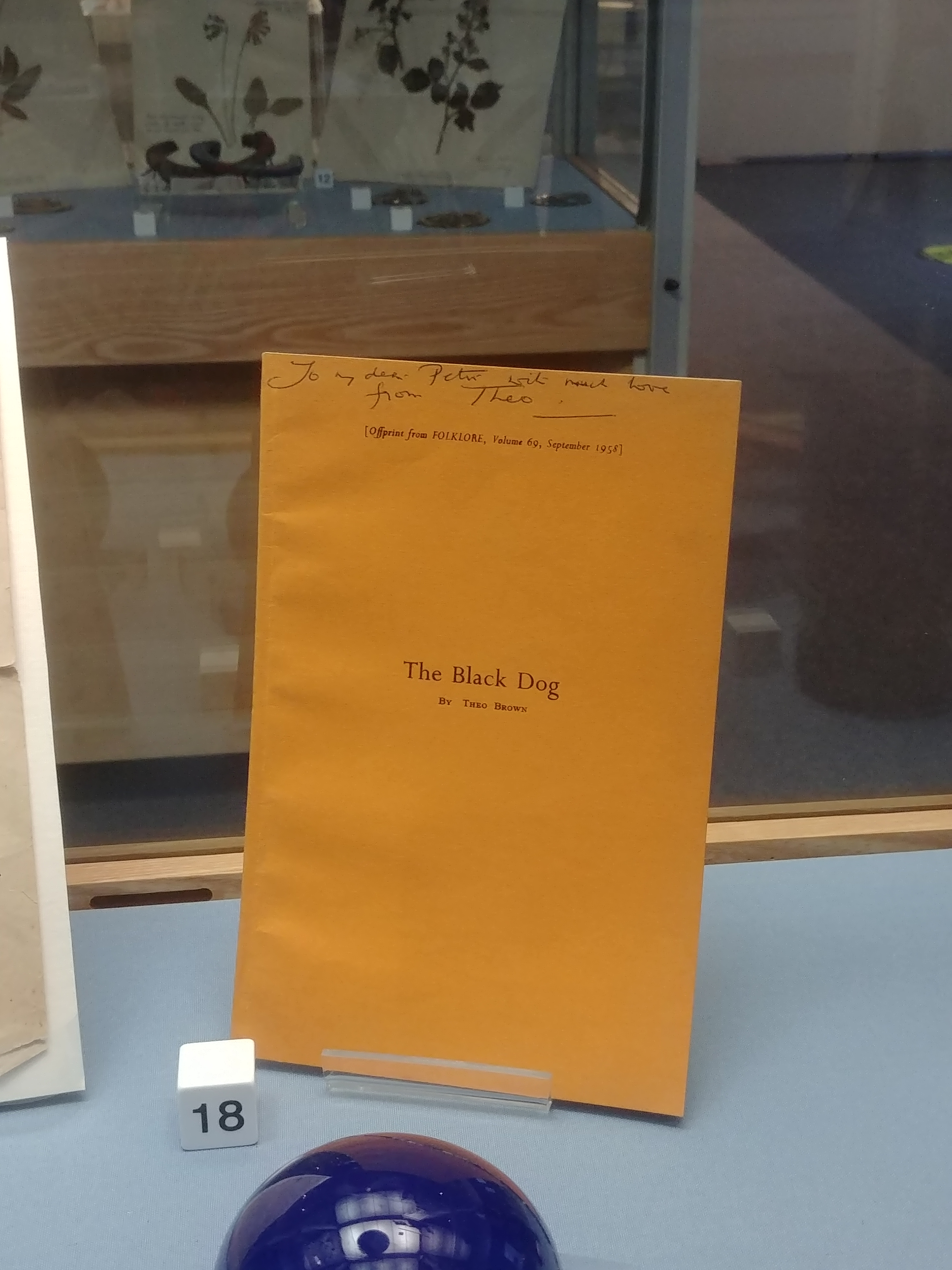
The Black Dog book, owned by Ethel Rudkin at North Lincolnshire Museum

In 1938, Rudkin published what became a seminal paper on the mythology of the Black Dog in Lincolnshire and is one of the most complete for any region of England, including songs, sightings and folktales. By 1958, the folklorist Theo Brown was referring to Rudkin's "famous article" in her own research. One interesting aspect for folklorists today is that Rudkin did not just record malevolent appearances of the dog, but also times when people reported the dog was protecting them from other apparitions. Rudkin claimed the phenomenon was viewed in a more positive light in Lincolnshire than in other counties. She also recorded instances of "black dogs" named and known by local communities. She was the first researcher to empirically categorise "black dog" sightings.

The academic study of the Harry Potter series has also drawn on Rudkin's work on the Black Dog motif.

Rudkin's research is referenced in a wide variety of research papers, including: on the Green Man; landscape history as cultural practice; and portents of death.

== Legacy ==
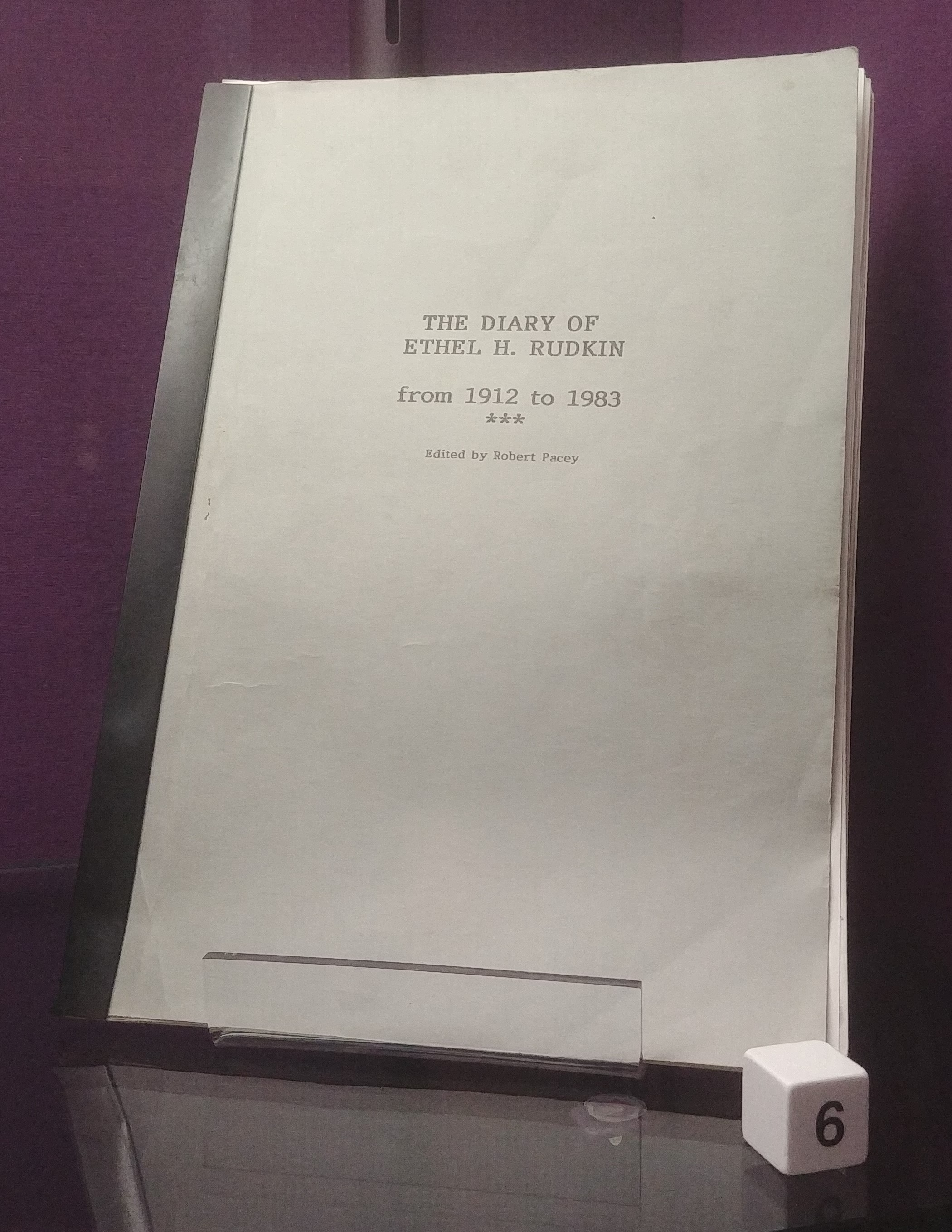
The diaries of Ethel Rudkin (North Lincolnshire Museum)

Rudkin's papers and archives are held by Lincolnshire Archives, and include her archaeological notebooks, notes on her collections, photographs, diaries and correspondence. Holdings at North Lincolnshire Museum consist of archaeological and historical objects she collected, these include: a Neolithic jade axe from Wroot; witch balls; and a hobby-horse from a plough jag team. They also include fifty-five plough pebbles from the Scunthorpe area. A gad whip owned by Rudkin is in the Caistor Heritage Trust collection. Many of the large objects collected by Rudkin are at the Museum of Lincolnshire Life, which began to be acquired in 1966 by curator Brian Loughborough.

== Publications ==
=== Books ===
- Lincolnshire Folklore (E P Publishing, 1974)
- Notes on the History of Toynton All Saints and Toynton St Peter (Old Chapel Lane Books)

=== Articles ===
- "An account of the Haxey hood game 1932" in Folklore (1932)
- "Roman sites north of Lincoln: notes on several known and unknown" in Lincolnshire Magazine (1932)
- 'Collecteana' Folklore (1933)
- "Lincolnshire Folklore Witches & Devils" in Folklore (1934)
- 'The Black Dog' Folklore (1938)
- "Will O'the Wisp" in Folklore (1938)
- "Willoughton, Lincolnshire" in Folklore (1939)
- "Folklore of Lincolnshire, especially the low-lying areas of Lindsey" in Folklore (1955)
- "The Medieval Salt Industry in the Lindsey Marshland" in Lincolnshire Architectural and Archaeological Society Reports and Papers (1960)

== Awards ==
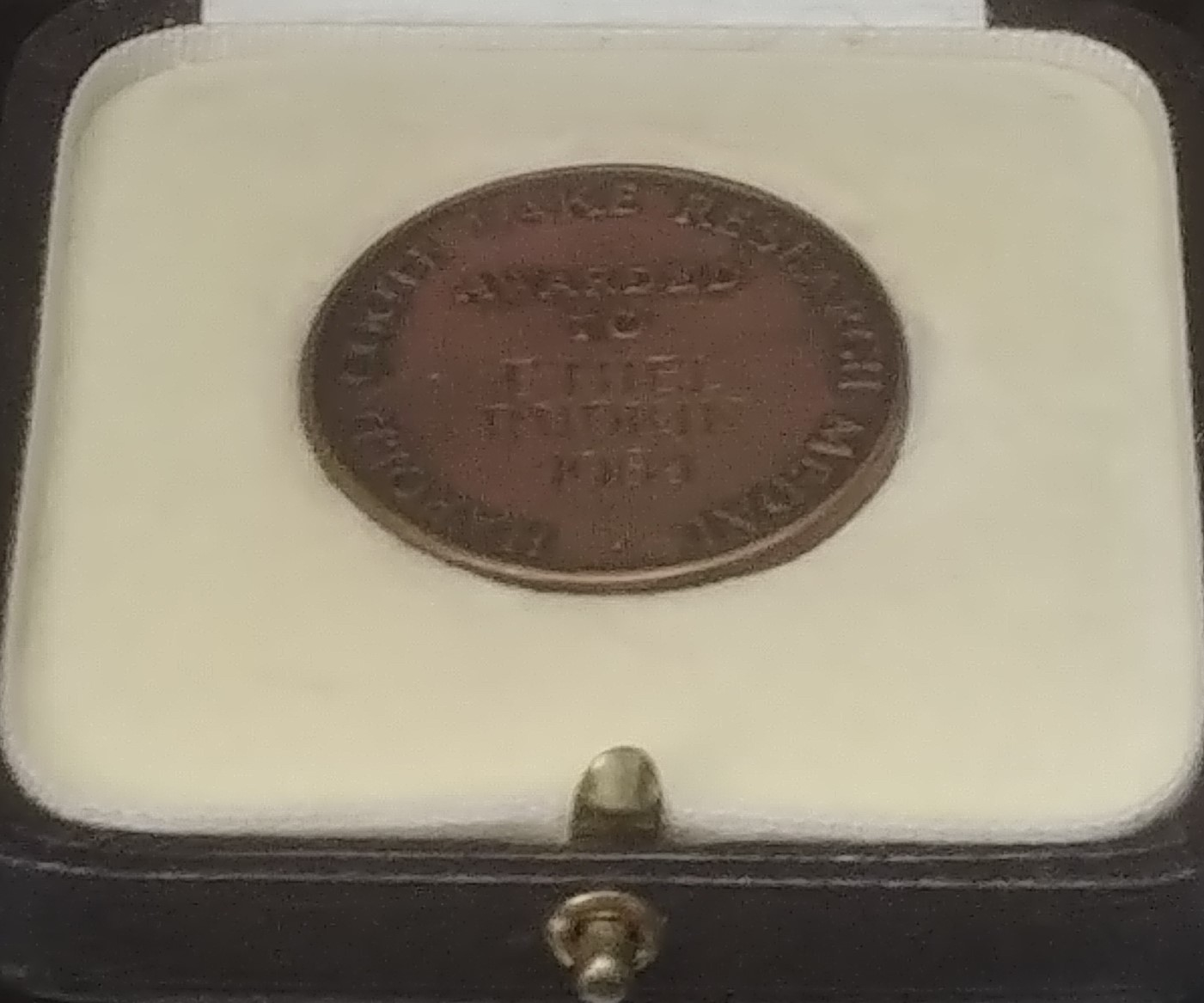
Coote Lake Medal awarded to Ethel Rudkin (North Lincolnshire Museum)

- Rudkin refused the MBE in 1976
- 1984 – the Coote Lake Medal, jointly awarded with Dr Hilda Davidson
