= Witham Preceptory =

South Witham Preceptory
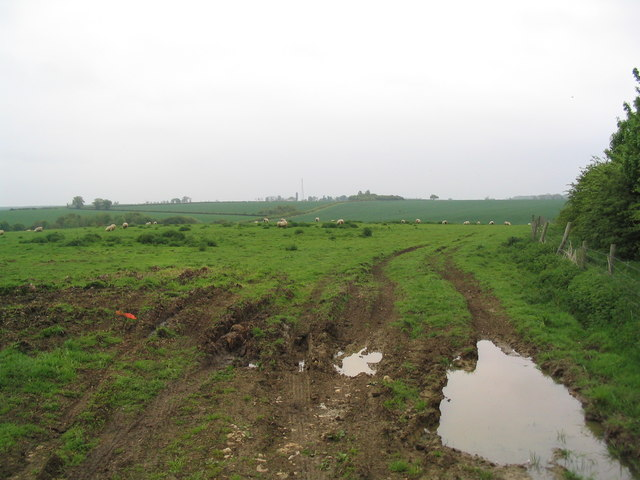
- Site of South Witham Preceptory at Temple Hill

- Location in Lincolnshire
- 52.7744°N 0.6251°W
- Location: Temple Hill
- OS grid reference: TF 08643032

History
- Founded: 1164 or earlier
- Demolished: After 1540

Scheduled monument
- Reference no.: 325499

Withham Preceptory, one of the smallest Knights Templar preceptories in England, was founded, before 1164, at Temple Hill, near South Witham, Lincolnshire, and was abandoned in the early 14th century. The site of the former preceptory at Temple Hill, South Witham. It 'has been largely under pasture' since the Knights Templar left in 1308.

== Founding and establishment ==
Margaret Percy and Hubert de Rie were "great benefactors, if not founders" of the preceptory, which began as "a simple hall with outbuildings" before 1164. Development in the early 13th century led to a "regularly laid-out farmstead complex" comprising "two halls, a chapel, kitchens and agricultural and industrial buildings". The site, which has the River Witham at the base of the hill, and the river's source, half a mile distant, also included a water-mill, fishponds and "other water-control features".

=== Chapel ===
The rectangular chapel, constructed between 1200 and 1220, was unusual for a Knights Templar preceptory, as the Templars typically built distinctive rounded churches, to resemble the Church of the Holy Sepulchre at Jerusalem, a practice which "was unique in medieval England". Its size was around 12.8 by 5 metres (42 by 16 ft), with a stairwell in the northwest corner, that may have led to a bell tower. Two large footings, to the north of the altar, may be evidence of an Easter Sepulchre and a wall safe. During 20th-century excavations, burial remains were found within the chapel: to the south, a body that had once been in a wooden coffin, the coffin having disintegrated over time, and, to the north, a body in a stone coffin without a lid. A possibly corresponding stone coffin lid, dated to 1250, had been used, from around 1550, as part of a nearby footbridge over the River Witham, before being moved to the church of St John the Baptist at South Witham in 1905.

== Late 13th century ==
In the late 13th century the hall and chapel were rebuilt, the farmstead complex was expanded and enclosed by a wall. The preceptory, at its largest, was: "Set about a great court, they had included a gatehouse on the north, a fine range of barns on the west, a domestic complex with hall, chambers, chapel and kitchen on the south-east, and a workshop area, with its ovens and kilns on the east." In total, foundations for eighteen buildings have been located, ranging in size from 4 metres by 8 metres to 10 metres by 24 metres. Remains have also been found for what has been interpreted as a kitchen garden, and also a hall keep, 'intended as a place of refuge in times of crisis'.

== Disestablishment and Knights Hospitaller ==
After the arrest of the Knights Templar in 1308, and the sequestering of their lands by the Crown, records show the preceptory was occupied by eight famuli, or farm servants, twelve ploughmen, a bailiff and three shepherds, all paid from nearby Temple Bruer.

The Knights Templar order was formally disestablished by Pope Clement V, in 1312, and the Witham preceptory was completely abandoned by 1324. The lands passed to the Knights Hospitaller, who, in 1338, held a messuage (dwelling of some kind), eight carucates (units of ploughland) and moiety, in this case half the endowment, of the South Witham church, but are believed to have left the former preceptory uninhabited, and eventually incorporated the landholding into their estate at Temple Bruer.

== Later history ==
In 1563, after the Dissolution of the Monasteries, the property, then known as 'Great Temple', was granted, by Elizabeth I, to Stephen Holford in 1562. It was then owned, with 'buildings as it stood', by Thomas, the son of William Wimberley, of South Witham, (originally of Lancashire), and remained with that family 'until 1761, or thereabouts'.

The preceptory site, recorded as uninhabited in the late 18th century, along with the Wimberley's 'mansion, the post-house, and other lands', then passed to Lord William Manners, younger brother of John Manners, 3rd Duke of Rutland. From Manners, it went to a descendant, Lionel Tollemache, 8th Earl of Dysart, who held possession in the mid-1800s. Describing the preceptory in 1837, Thomas Moule wrote that the 'foundation of the building only remains, and they extend over several acres'.

During the 1960s, archeological excavations commenced, which, as it had mainly been used for pasture, meant that 'post-medieval disturbance' had 'been minimal'. Items found during the digs included a gilded ring, knights head belt buckle, arrowheads and horseshoes.

A second archeological excavation took place in the area, in April 2002, following preliminary work in December 2000. Evidence from the 11th to 15th century suggest large scale ironwork and bread-making in South Witham to supply local religious houses.

== See also ==
- List of Templar sites in Lincolnshire

== Bibliography ==
- Antram N (revised), Pevsner N & Harris J, (1989), The Buildings of England: Lincolnshire, Yale University Press.
- Charles G. Addison The History of the Knights Templars (1997) ISBN 0-932813-40-2
- Larking, L B. and Kemble, J. M (1857), The Knights Hospitallers in England: Being a Report of the Prior Philip de Thame to the Grand Master Elyan de Villanova for A.D. 1338 Camden Society, pp. 153–156
- Mayes, P., (2002), Excavations at a Templar Preceptory, South Witham, Lincolnshire 1965-67 (English Heritage: Society for Medieval Archaeology Monograph)
- Mills, D. The Knights Templar in Kesteven North Kesteven District Council (c.1990)
- Sister Elspeth (1906) in Page, William,(ed). A History of the County of Lincoln Volume 2. Victoria County History. pp. 210–213 Houses of Knights Templars: Willoughton, Eagle, Aslackby, South Witham and Temple Bruer.
