= Bottesford Preceptory =

Community of the Knights Templar in Lindsey, England

Coordinates: 53.55106°N 0.64606°W

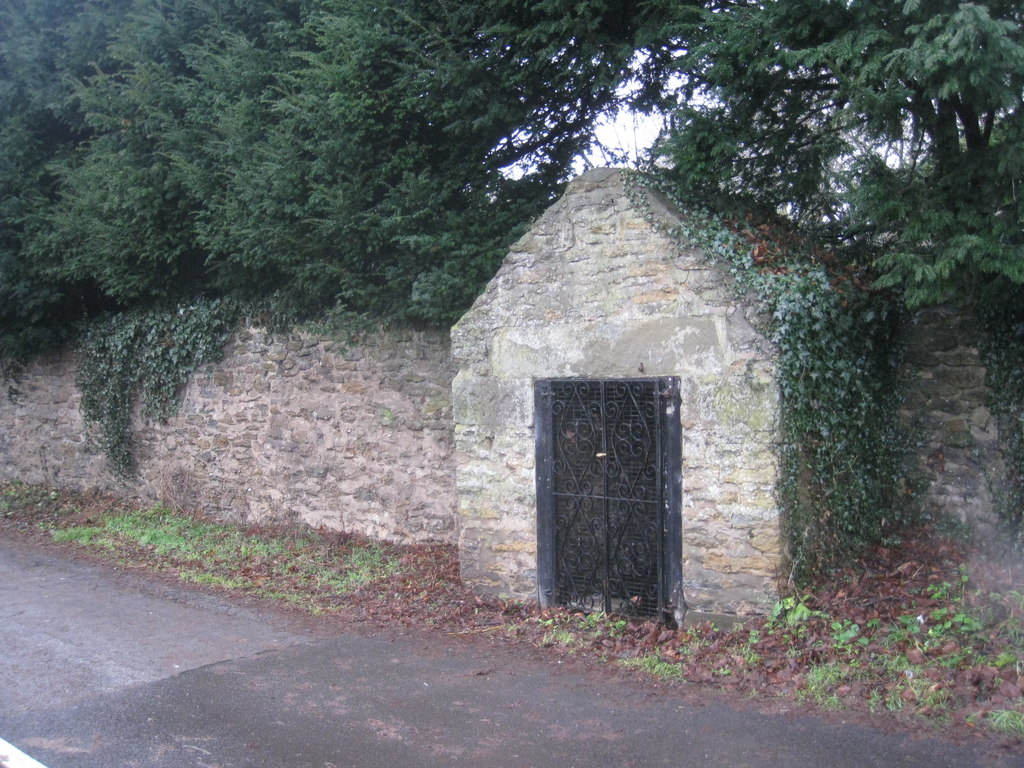
St. John's Well The Victorian well house over the medieval well

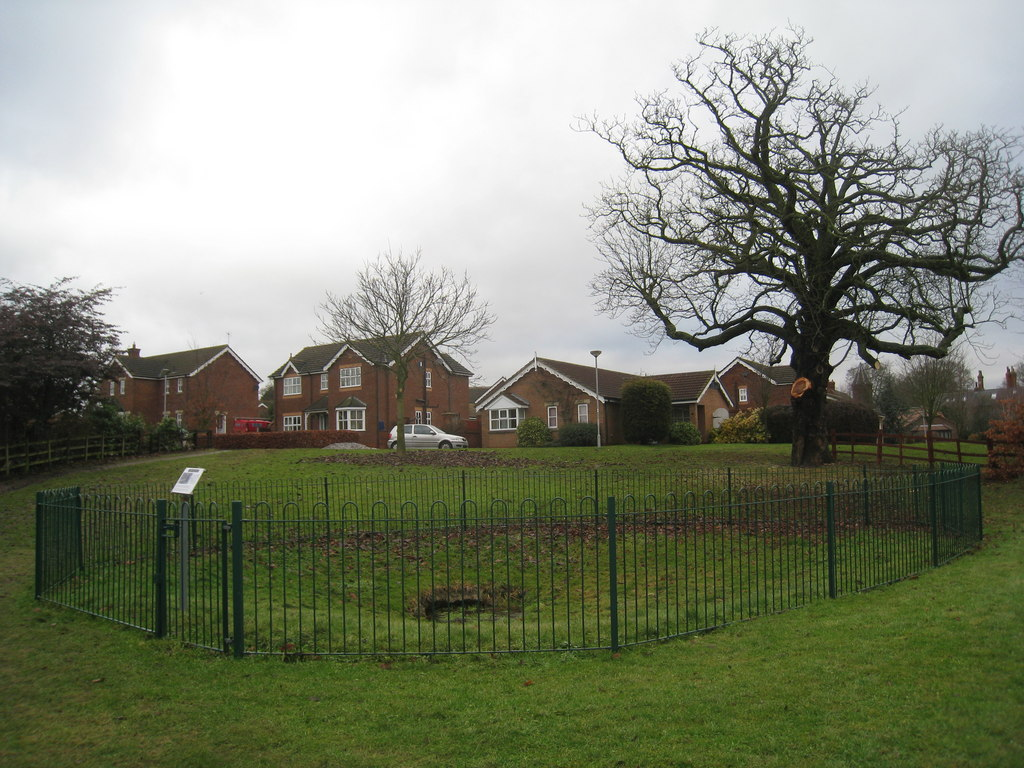
The Templar's Bath The dipping well

Bottesford Preceptory was sited at Bottesford, just to the south of Scunthorpe, in Lindsey, England. It was on low-lying land, near the Bottesford Beck, about 3 miles (5 km) to the west of the escarpment of the Lincoln Cliff limestone upland, and about the same distance to the east of the River Trent. A preceptory was a community of the Knights Templar who lived on one of that order's estates in the charge of its preceptor. A preceptory also referred to the estate and its buildings. The present Bottesford Manor is believed to have been the gatehouse to the preceptory.

Templars Bath, a spring in the field behind Bottesford Manor, is now hardly discernible, being simply a gathering of stones. The bath has been attributed to the Romans but others believe it was a dipping bath or well used by the Templar workers. It was once used as a "magic" health-giving spring. Travellers would drink its waters and leave cloth offerings (a "rag well"). This healing property was probably associated with its position near a Templar hospital. The only distinctive Templar artefact found here was an ancient gravestone with a large cross upon it. It was covering a body buried in a grave that had been placed at the angle formed by the north wall of the chancel and the east wall of the north transept, though this description is inconsistent with a normal Templar round church.

Archaeologists excavated the Templar fields nearby in 1983, but little was found and the land was back-filled.

== See also ==
- List of Templar sites in Lincolnshire
