= Aslackby Preceptory =

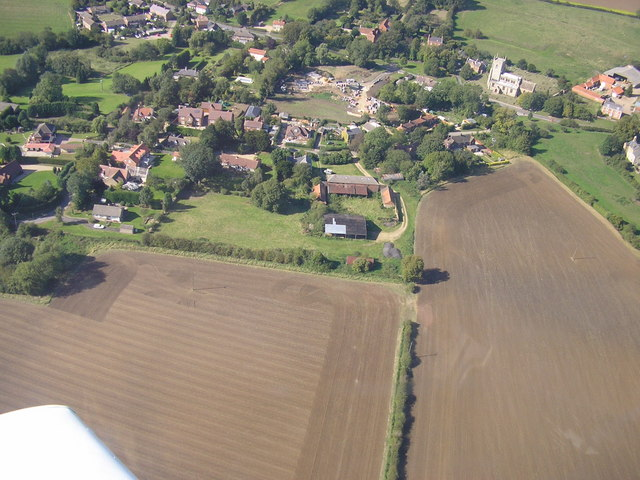
- Aslackby village – the preceptory was to the south-east of the church

- Location in Lincolnshire
- 52.8595°N 0.3878°W
- Location: The Temple Farm
- OS grid reference: TF 08643032

History
- Founded: 1164 or earlier
- Demolished: After 1536 and before 1892

Listed Building – Grade II
- Designated: 06-May-1952
- Reference no.: 1062758

Aslackby Preceptory in Lincolnshire lay to the south-east of Aslackby Church. Until about 1891 a tower, possibly of the preceptory church, together with a vaulted undercroft, survived as part the Temple farmhouse. Temple farmhouse was subsequently rebuilt and a 15th-century window and a stone pinnacle remain in the garden.

== History of the preceptory ==
The preceptory was, according to William Dugdale, founded either in or before 1164. This is recorded in Dugdale’s Monasticon Anglicanum, which states that Hubert de Rye presented the Templars with church of Aslackby with its chapel "in the year when Thomas, archbishop of Canterbury departed from the King [Henry II] at Northampton" – i.e. 1164. After the order was suppressed in the first decade of the 14th century, the property passed to Temple Bruer.

== The Templars ==
The word preceptory is used for the community of the Knights Templar which lived on one of the order's estates in the charge of its preceptor. From that its meaning was extended to include the estate and its buildings. The one at Aslackby was founded in 1192. Little of its structure survives, but early descriptions and sketches indicate that its church was like that at Temple Bruer Preceptory, a chancel with an apsidal east end and a round nave to its west. This was a standard design for Templar churches, in imitation of the Church of the Holy Sepulchre in Jerusalem. The best-known example in England is the Temple Church at the western end of the City of London. Later, towers were built at both the Lincolnshire churches, the one at Aslackby apparently around 1200, on the south side of the round nave.

== See also ==
- List of Templar sites in Lincolnshire

== Bibliography ==
- Addison, Charles G. The History of the Knights Templars (1997) ISBN 0932813402
- Antram N (revised), Pevsner N & Harris J. The Buildings of England: Lincolnshire, Yale University Press. (1989)
- Larking, L B. and Kemble, J. M., The Knights Hospitallers in England: Being a Report of the Prior Philip de Thame to the Grand Master Elyan de Villanova for A.D. 1338 Camden Society, (1857) pp. 153–156
- Mills, D. The Knights Templar in Kesteven North Kesteven District Council (c.1990)
- Sister Elspeth Houses of Knights Templars: Willoughton, Eagle, Aslackby, South Witham and Temple Bruer in Page, William, (ed). A History of the County of Lincoln Volume 2. Victoria County History. pp. 210–213 (1906)
- White, A. The Knights Templar of at Temple Bruer and Aslackby, Lincolnshire Museums Archaeology Series No.25. (1981)
