= Eagle, Lincolnshire =

Village in the North Kesteven district of Lincolnshire, England

Coordinates: 53.193900°N 0.688775°W

Eagle
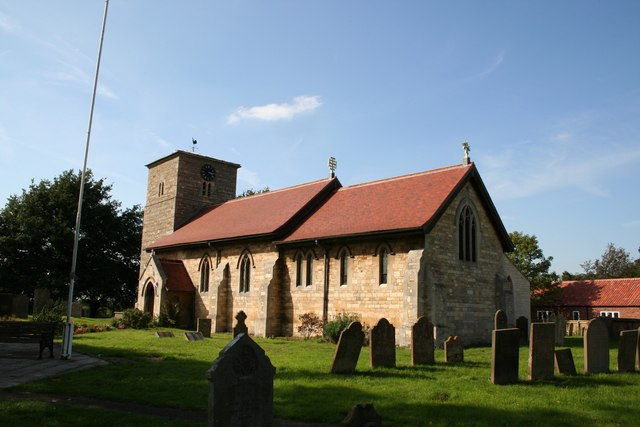
- Church of All Saints, Eagle

- Location within Lincolnshire
- Population: 793 (2011)
- OS grid reference: SK 87700 67115
  - London: 120 mi (190 km) S
- Civil parish: Eagle and Swinethorpe
- District: North Kesteven
- Shire county: Lincolnshire
- Region: East Midlands
- Country: England
- Sovereign state: United Kingdom
- Post town: Lincoln
- Postcode district: LN6
- Police: Lincolnshire
- Fire: Lincolnshire
- Ambulance: East Midlands
- UK Parliament: Sleaford and North Hykeham (UK Parliament constituency)

Eagle is a village in the civil parish of Eagle and Swinethorpe, in the North Kesteven district of Lincolnshire, England. It is situated 7 miles (11 km) south-west from Lincoln and 2 miles (3.2 km) east from North Scarle. The population of the civil parish of Eagle and Swinethorpe taken at the 2011 census was 793.

All Saints Anglican church dates from the 13th century and is Grade II listed. It was rebuilt in the 18th century and again in 1904.

The village has a primary school, post office, village hall, park, nursing home, playing field, and public house.

== Toponymy ==
Scholars believe that the name means "Oak-tree wood or clearing.", from Old English āc, an oak-tree and Old English lēah, a forest, wood, glade or clearing, and in consequence, there is no connection to the large bird of prey, the eagle.

== History ==
Eagle appears in the Domesday Book of 1086: the landowners were: Roger of Poitou (property formerly by Arnketill Barn), Durand Malet, Odo the Crossbowman (land formerly owned by Gunnketill), and Countess Judith (land formerly owned by Earl Waltheof of Northumbria). Eagle had a church and a priest. Countess Judith's manor had a value of £12. Countess Judith was a niece of King William I of England – she was the daughter of his half-sister Adelaide of Normandy and her husband Lambert II, Count of Lens. She was also the widow of Earl Waltheof of Northumbria (1072–75, the last of the Anglo-Saxon Earls of England) who she had betrayed over his part in the Revolt of the Earls, and who was executed in 1076.

A preceptory of the Knights Templar was founded in Eagle by King Stephen. In 1312 it passed to the Hospitallers and became one of only two infirmaries for Templars in England. Stephen's original endowment included the manor of Eagle and the churches of Eagle, Swinderby and Scarle.

In 1921 the parish had a population of 371. On 1 April 1931 the parish was abolished to form "Eagle and Swinethorpe".

== Geography ==
The village main road is High Street, running approximately north-east to south-west. To the north of High Street the road to Scarle branches off towards the west; in the centre of the village Thorpe Road branches off towards the south-east. Church Lane on the west side of the village is a horseshoe loop joining High Street at both ends. Older maps show Green Lane, now a footpath, approximately parallel to High Street on its east.

There are three small housing estates: Falcon Close off Thorpe Lane, built in the 1960s; Hilltop Close off Scarle Lane, built in the 1970s; and Kestrel Rise off the southern High Street, built in the 1980s.

The areas and hamlets adjacent to the village are Eagle Moor, north-east; Eagle Hall, south-west; and Eagle Barnsdale, south-east. The nearest villages are Swinderby, south; North Scarle, west; and Thorpe on the Hill, east.

=== Transport ===
Eagle is situated close to major road connections, being located close to the A57 and A46 roads, which lead onwards to the A1. It is also located close to Lincoln Central station and Newark Northgate station on the East Coast Main Line. The closest airports are East Midlands Airport and Humberside Airport

== See also ==
- Eagle Barnsdale
- List of Templar sites in Lincolnshire
