= Willoughton Preceptory =

- Site of Willoughton Preceptory at Temple Garth.

- Location in Lincolnshire
- 53.4269°N 0.6053°W
- Location: Temple Garth
- OS grid reference: SK92769325

History
- Founded: earlier than 1164 by Roger de Builli
- Built: by Roger de Builli
- Demolished: After 1540

Scheduled monument
- Reference no.: 327087

Willoughton Preceptory was a holding of the Knights Templar at Willoughton, in north Lincolnshire, England. The preceptory stood at the farm, still called Temple Garth.

Willoughton, founded during the 1135–1154 reign of Stephen, was the richest of the English houses of the Templars. After the suppression of the order in 1312, the house passed to the Hospitallers in 1338. It was dissolved in 1540, the lands passing to King's College, Cambridge.

Horkstow Camera was a monastic cell dependent on the Preceptory.

== See also ==
- List of Templar sites in Lincolnshire
