= Great Limber =

Village and civil parish in the West Lindsey district of Lincolnshire, England

Coordinates: 53.562832°N 0.289850°W

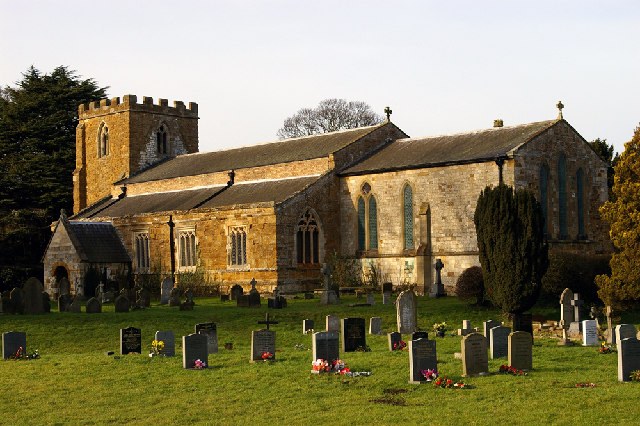
- St Peter's Church, Great Limber

- Location within Lincolnshire
- Population: 271 (2011)
- OS grid reference: TA133087
  - London: 145 mi (233 km) S
- District: West Lindsey
- Shire county: Lincolnshire
- Region: East Midlands
- Country: England
- Sovereign state: United Kingdom
- Post town: GRIMSBY
- Postcode district: DN37
- Police: Lincolnshire
- Fire: Lincolnshire
- Ambulance: East Midlands
- UK Parliament: Gainsborough

Great Limber is a village and civil parish in the West Lindsey district of Lincolnshire, England. The population of the civil parish at the 2011 census was 271. It is on the A18, 8 miles (13 km) west from Grimsby and 8 miles east from Brigg.

In 1885 Kelly's Directory noted a Wesleyan chapel, built in 1841. The parish of 4,970 acres (20 km^{2}), including 936 acres (3.8 km^{2}) of woodland, was farmed on four and five field systems, and produced chiefly wheat, barley and turnips. Its population in 1881 was 489.

Great Limber Grade I listed Anglican church is dedicated to St Peter. It is built in Norman and Decorated styles, consisting of chancel, nave, and aisles, with attached chapels and south porch, and a low crenellated west tower with three bells. The church was partly restored in 1873. Its chancel is mostly Victorian, although its arch is 13th-century as is the font. An 1890 stained glass window in the north aisle is by Kempe.

== See also ==
- List of Templar sites in Lincolnshire
