= Temple Bruer with Temple High Grange =

Coordinates: 53.0711°N 0.4962°W

- Civil parish and former extra-parochial area
- Location within Lincolnshire
- OS grid reference: TF008537
  - London: 110 mi (180 km) S
- District: North Kesteven
- Shire county: Lincolnshire
- Region: East Midlands
- Country: England
- Sovereign state: United Kingdom
- Post town: LINCOLN
- Postcode district: LN5
- Police: Lincolnshire
- Fire: Lincolnshire
- Ambulance: East Midlands
- UK Parliament: Sleaford and North Hykeham

Temple Bruer with Temple High Grange is a civil parish and a former extra-parochial area in North Kesteven, Lincolnshire, England which had in the Medieval period been held by the Knights Templar and later by the Knights Hospitaller of Temple Bruer Preceptory. By an Act of Parliament passed on 5 March 1879, Temple Bruer with Temple High Grange was constituted as a parish. At that time the parish was in Flaxwell wapentake, Sleaford Union and County Court district, and the ecclesiastical rural deanery of Longobody.

The parish lies 10 mi (16 km) to the southeast of Lincoln, 4 mi (6 km) southeast of Navenby and 6 mi (10 km) northwest of Sleaford. Wellingore and Welbourn parishes lie to the west and Brauncewell to the south. The old Roman road, Ermine Street, passes through the western edge of the parish, which at this point is a bridleway not a modern road. Temple High Grange is part of the parish. The parish covered about 3,900 acres (16 km^{2}). The parish is now within the electoral area of Ashby de la Launde and Cranwell Ward in North Kesteven District Council. It shares a parish council, the lowest tier of local government, with the adjacent parish of Ashby de la Launde and Bloxholm.

== Notable buildings ==
The 13th-century church tower of Temple Bruer Preceptory is a Grade I listed. There are three other listed buildings (two farmhouses and a stables), at grade II, in the parish.

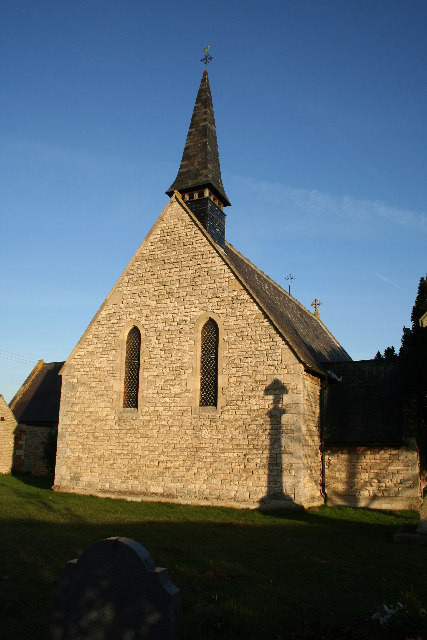
St John's Church, Temple Bruer

St John's Church, Temple Bruer was built to designs by James Fowler of Louth in 1874.

The village school was built in 1873 with accommodation for 45 children.
