= Preceptor =

Teacher responsible to uphold a certain law or tradition

A preceptor (from Latin, "praecepto") is a teacher responsible for upholding a precept, meaning a certain law or tradition.

== Buddhist monastic orders ==
Senior Buddhist monks can become the preceptors for newly ordained monks. In the Buddhist monastic code of discipline, the Buddha instructed that one of the criteria to conduct the "Higher Ordination" Ceremony (Upasampadā) is that the candidate will need to have a preceptor to provide guidance on monastic discipline, consisting of 227 precepts. During the ordination, the candidate will request one of the senior monks to be his preceptor. When the senior monk agreed to do so, he will be the preceptor of the candidate and guide him as long as he remains a bhikkhu in the Buddha's Dispensation (Buddha Sāsana).

== Christian military orders ==
A preceptor was historically in charge of a preceptory, the headquarters of an order of monastic knights, such as the Knights Hospitaller or the Knights Templar, within a given geographical area. The preceptor exercised supreme control over his brethren and was answerable only to the Grand Master of his order. A preceptory's main focus was on its church and on accommodation for the brethren. Examples in the UK include the Hospitaller Torphichen Preceptory in West Lothian; West Peckham Preceptory in Kent; the Templar Aslackby Preceptory in Lincolnshire; Keele Preceptory in Staffordshire; and Temple, Midlothian.

== Freemasonry ==
Within modern Freemasonry, the preceptor is the head of a lodge of instruction. Lodges of instruction operate within a geographical area and provide training in the performance of the order's rituals. The preceptor, whose position is elective, is usually a Freemason who has spent several years as a director of ceremonies in his local lodge and is considered an expert in the rituals.

In English Freemasonry, the Preceptor of the lodge is usually appointed by the Master. His main responsibility is to prompt those masons who have forgotten their words. Some lodges, and some preceptors, take the role as teacher more seriously than others.

== Music ==
In the world of music, the title of preceptor usually refers to a monk responsible for making music in a monastery. He trains the monks in the traditions of plainchant for daily services and prayers.

== Education ==
In some universities in North America, preceptors are student volunteers who assist the professor and teaching assistants of a large lecture class by helping to design lessons, and holding office hours and review sessions. In some cases, volunteers are required to take outside classes focused on "leadership development", where the final grade is determined by both the professor and a leadership development teacher. The term "preceptor" can also refer to a paid student grader.

At some universities, including Harvard, Cambridge and Oxford, "preceptors" are not students but faculty members teaching courses in writing, music, mathematics, languages or life sciences. In some departments, they are not tenured faculty but rather non-ladder faculty, generally PhDs, who help to administer courses. Harvard preceptors, who teach introductory writing, have included the New Yorker staff writer George Packer, the novelist Tom Perrotta, the former Boston Globe music critic Richard Dyer and the poet Dan Chiasson. At Columbia University, on the other hand, "preceptors" are senior graduate students who, along with senior faculty, teach courses on "Literature Humanities" and "Contemporary Civilization". The title is also used to refer to teaching assistants at Princeton, who are typically graduate students.

At Elon University School of Law in North Carolina, a preceptor is an attorney who mentors two or three first-year law students.

== Health ==
In medicine, allied health, midwifery, paramedicine, pharmacy and nursing education, a preceptor is a skilled practitioner or faculty member who supervises students in a clinical setting to allow practical experience with patients.
