= St James' Church, Aslackby =

Church in Lincolnshire, England

St James the Great Church, Aslackby
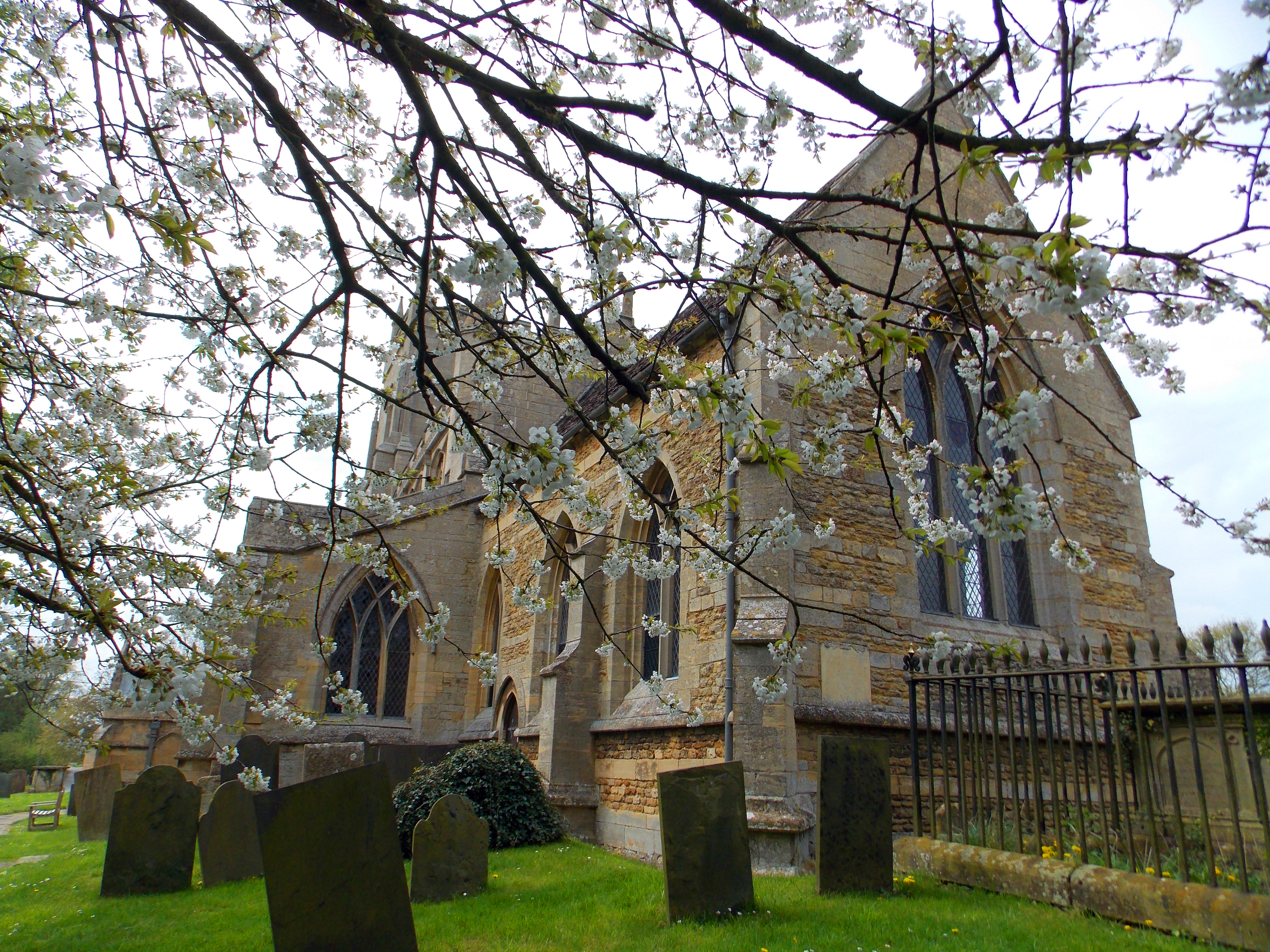
- Church of St James the Great, Aslackby
- St James the Great Church, Aslackby
- 52.860098°N 0.38934472°W
- OS grid reference: TF 06883 45893
- Country: England
- Denomination: Church of England

History
- Founded: early 13th century
- Dedication: James, son of Zebedee

Architecture
- Heritage designation: Grade I
- Designated: 30 October 1968
- Architectural type: Early English ; Perpendicular

Specifications
- Materials: limestone-ashlar; ironstone rubble

Administration
- Province: Canterbury
- Diocese: Lincoln
- Deanery: Lafford
- Parish: Aslackby

St James the Great Church is a Grade I listed Church of England parish church dedicated to James, son of Zebedee in Aslackby, Lincolnshire, England. The church is 7 miles (11 km) north from Bourne, and in the Aslackby and Laughton parish on the eastern edge the South Kesteven Lincolnshire Vales.

The church is significant for its historic association with the Aslackby Preceptory of the Knights Templar, and its unusual arch details in the tower.

St James' is in the ecclesiastical parish of Aslackby, and one of six churches in the Billingborough Group of Parishes, with their associated churches, in the Deanery of Lafford and the Diocese of Lincoln. Other churches in the group are: St Andrew's Church, Horbling; St Andrew's Church, Billingborough; St Andrew's Church, Sempringham; St Andrew's Church, Dowsby; and Christchurch, Pointon. The Group constitutes the Gilbertine Benefice. St James' is within the Aslackby conservation area.

== History ==
St James' parish register dates from 1558.

No church or priest for Aslackby is recorded in the 1086 Domesday Book. The first mention of a priest is of Geoffrey de Temple in 1225, attendant to the Knights Templar who had established a preceptory at Aslackby the previous century. In 1164 benefactor Hubert de Rye provided a church and round chapel for the Templars, the remains of which stood until the 18th century when it became part of a farmhouse. The preceptory itself was probably founded in 1194 following the 1185 patronage of Robert de Rye. In 1312 the Templar preceptory was appropriated by King Edward II, and by 1338 it had been transferred to the Knights Hospitaller with an income of £40 per annum as a messuage—including church and associated land—under the control of Henry, 3rd Earl of Lancaster. Following this the preceptory for administrative purposes became part of the previous Knights Templar property of Temple Bruer. The first Knights Hospitaller sponsored priest at Aslackby was Nicholas de Camelton in 1321. In 1541-42, following the dissolution of the monasteries, the lands were granted to Edward, Lord Clinton and his wife, Ursula. Parts of the original Templar round church still existed until 1800. The remaining preceptory tower was demolished in 1891. The building of the present St James' church was begun c.1300, conjoined to the appropriated Templar property. The church was extended in the mid-15th century, with a further restoration in 1856 at which time the chancel was rebuilt.

By 1840 and until at least 1856, the parish vicarage and living, with a yearly net income of £453 from tithes and 39 acres (0.16 km^{2}) of glebe—land used to support a parish priest—was granted as property to layman R. F. Barstow (as impropriator), who became patron of Aslackby incumbent clergy. By 1876 the living, increased to a value of £480 with an included residence, was in the gift of Rev John Smithson Barstow who was also the recipient as incumbent until 1906, after which Rev Robert Stanley Coupland became vicar initially through the gift of Barstow who had removed to Aldershot. By this time the value of the living had dropped to £260. Coupland remained vicar until at least 1933.

St James' achieved English Heritage Grade I building listing status on 30 October 1968.

In 2010 the church received a grant of £10,000 for 'community' purposes from the National Churches Trust.

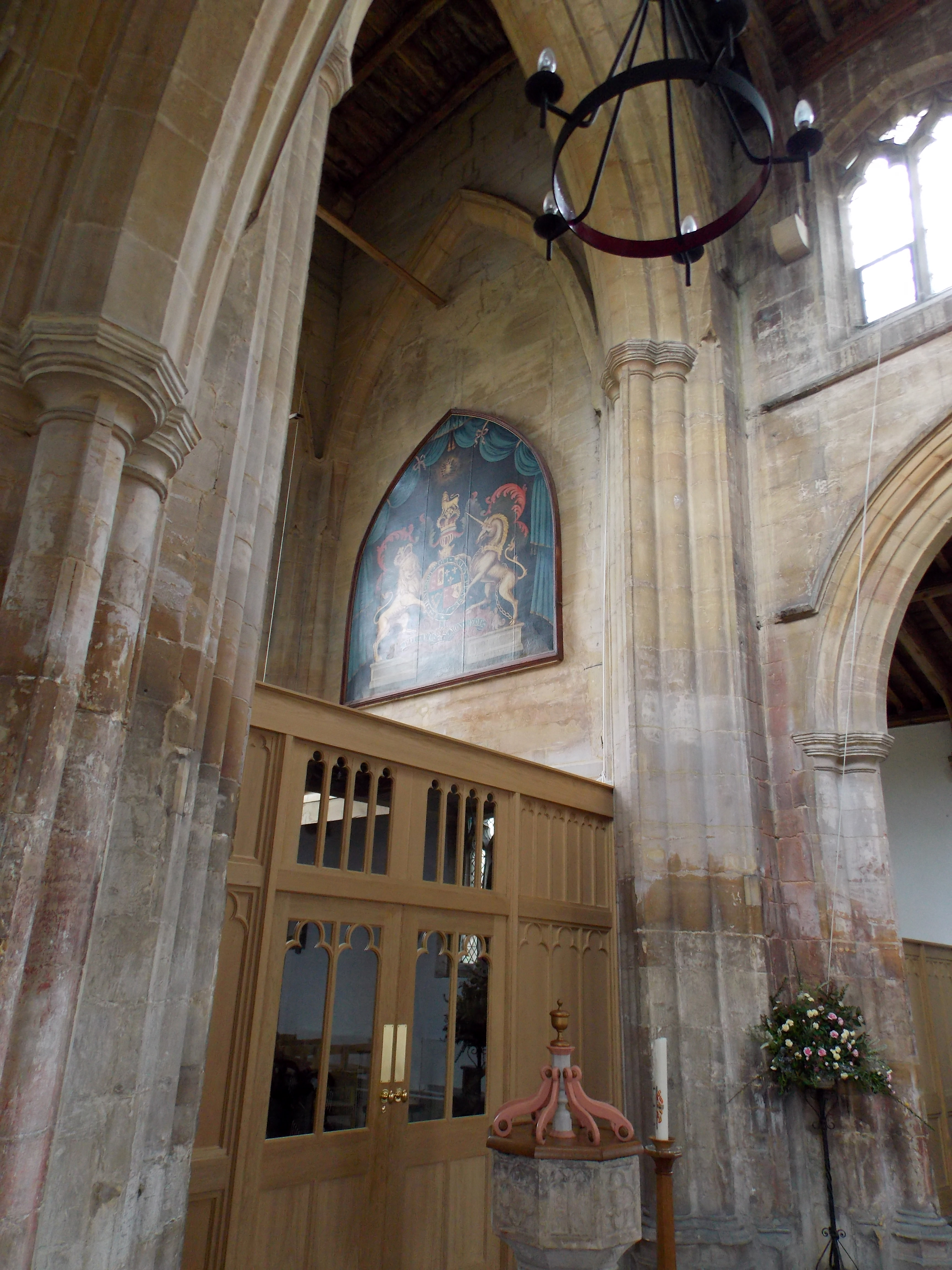
Tower arch showing the 2010 screen; the restored Hanoverian coat of arms on the north wall is set within the tower blind arch

Also in 2010 the church was subject to Archaeological Monitoring and Recording during excavations as part of the establishment of welfare services. The £135,000 refurbishment added a tower meeting room behind a new screen, an oak kitchen, toilets and central heating. The works included construction of a pit for an oil storage tank for a new boiler. Trenches were dug within the churchyard, tower and north aisle. Some human remains, including a child's, were unearthed in the churchyard—subsequently reburied—as was animal bone. Stone foundations at the south from the church were found that predate the tower. Pieces of 5th- to 8th-century Saxon to 19th-century pottery were found, and possible post holes that might indicate timber structures as part of the church's history. Some pottery was identified as being from Staffordshire and Derbyshire. An Early Medieval floor of layered straw was exposed. Tower floor excavations uncovered fragments of 19th-century glass and ironwork, and evidence of pre-14th- or 15th-century stonework that had been integrated into the tower.

As part of the 2010 refurbishment an 18th-century Hanoverian coat of arms was restored. The arms, possibly originally positioned within the chancel arch, had been held in storage for perhaps 150 years, since probably after an 1856 chancel restoration. In 2008 the neglected arms were removed from storage to its present position within the tower to await the recent restoration.

The church was pictorially featured in the July 2009 edition of Country Life magazine, under the title "Let there be light". In the same issue the magazine described the St James' restoration as one of community involvement and fundraising over five years, particularly referring to the Hanoverian coat of arms "restored by the community". Church use was open to non-liturgical activities including concerts, talks, family activities, and a film club. St James received a runner-up £5,000 prize and silver medal for its restoration in the 2012 'Village Church for Village Life Award' sponsored by Country Life, mentioning a church transformation with new upholstered seating, kitchen, toilets and west screen.

The Lincolnshire International Chamber Music Festival staged a 2012 'Meet the Composer' event at St James' with composer and violist Sally Beamish, and held string instrument workshops for children. In August the same year a concert was performed under the Festival by classical pianist Ashley Wass.

In 2007 St James' was subject to theft of lead to the value of £13,000 from the church roof by a "trio from Lithuania" who had been responsible for twenty such thefts, particularly in Lincolnshire, resulting in £1 million of damage.

== Architecture ==
=== Exterior ===
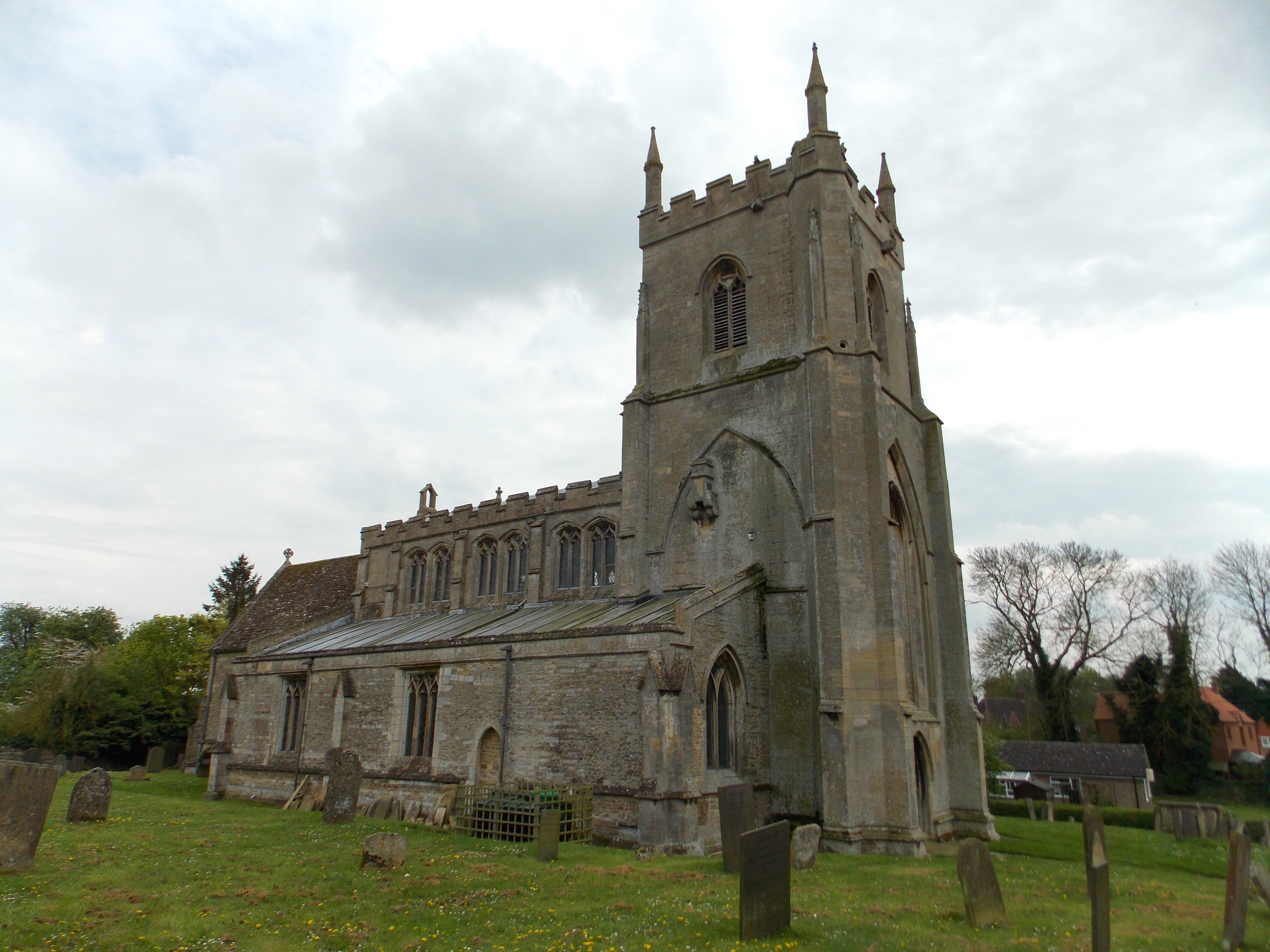
Church from the north-west

St James' is of limestone-ashlar and coursed-ironstone rubble construction. It comprises a chancel, nave, north and south aisles, a west tower and a south porch, and is of Early English and Perpendicular styles.

The tower is early 14th-century, Perpendicular, and of two stages—a tall lower stage, with belfry above—and is partly clasped by the north and south aisles. Angled buttresses of three steps run at each corner to the belfry stage and are continued to near the parapet by square shafts, topped by crocketed pinnacles set away from the tower face. On both west corners the buttresses sit on a moulded socle (plinth) topped by a cill band—angled projection that allows water to flow from a building face—that continues in this style around the tower and south aisle only. The north-east and south-east buttresses spring from the north and south aisle and nave roofs. The north-west corner has a five-sided stair turret built out from the tower, with a slit window at the west, and belfry stairs within. Between each angle buttress, except those at the stair turret corner, is a projecting gargoyle at the height of the clerestory parapet. The tower 14th-century west doorway is pointed, with four set-back continuous mouldings set on a single running plinth. Around the doorway, from the spring, is a hood mould. Within the doorway is a plank double door with large decorative iron face hinges.

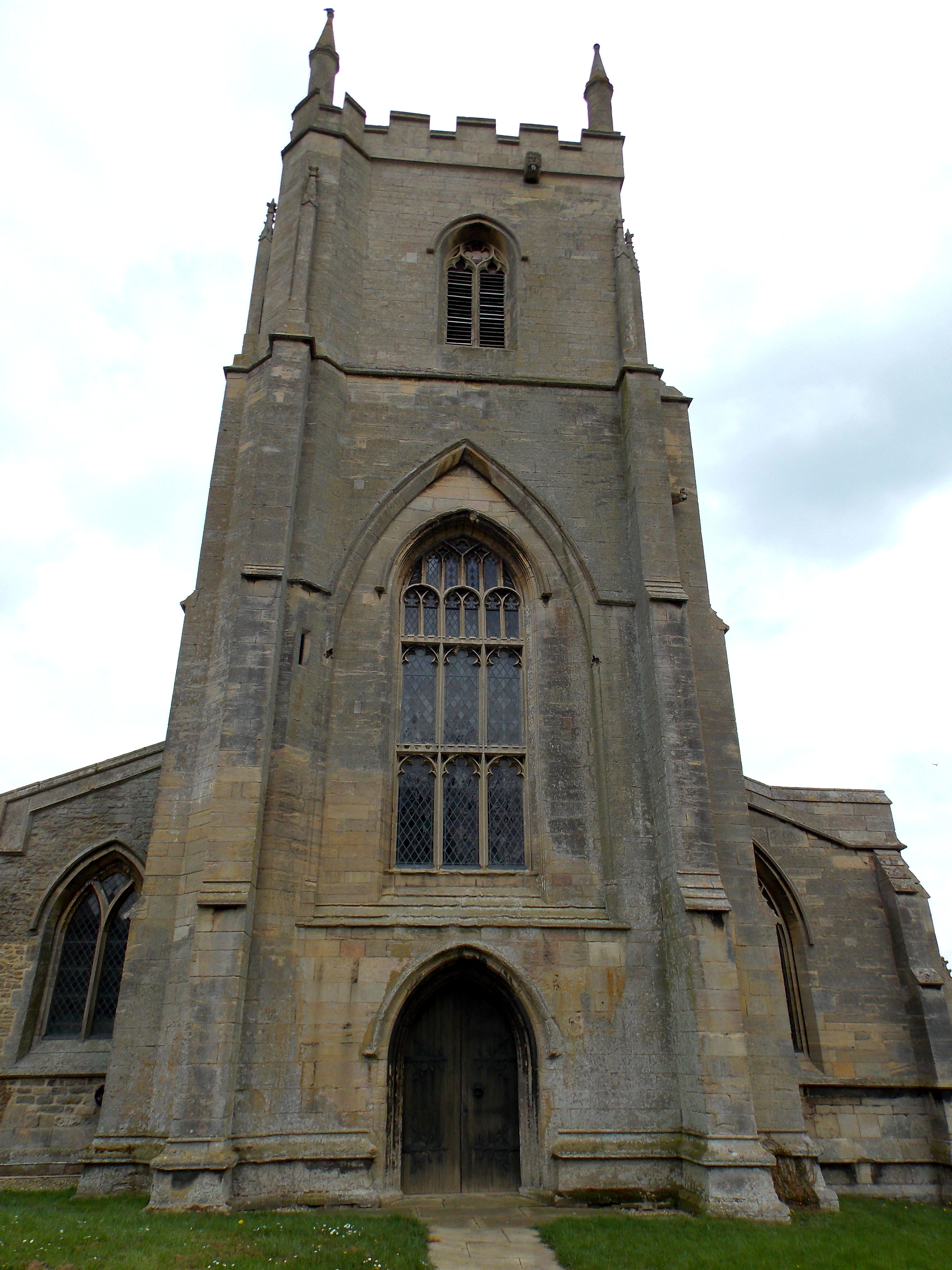
Tower showing the west door, and window within the blind arch

Above the west tower door is a large blocked pointed arch, chamfered above the spring, and vertically edged with round moulded jambs ending in open cusped devices. Around the arch is a hood mould. Within the arch is a 14th-century (Pevsner) or late 15th-century (National Heritage) window surrounded by a hood mould. The window opening jambs are single-chamfered, with the arch double-chamfered, and lead to a Perpendicular window. The lower part of the window is of three lights, separated by chamfered mullions and divided and topped by transoms containing castellated details, with tracery of trefoil heads and spandrels. Two further ranks of lights above are subdivided vertically into panel tracery—a Perpendicular style of upright straight openings above lower lights—with 'Y' tracery, trefoil heads, and quatrefoil openings. All lights are clear glazed within diamond leading.

On the south and north side of the tower are blocked arches mirroring that on the west side, but cut through by the later added north and south aisles. Pevsner debates whether these arches are "relieving arches" or decorative. Within the north blocked arch is a protruding 15th-century capped vent stack supported by corbels.

A string-course runs between the tower lower and belfry stages. Each belfry side contains a pointed arch opening of same style surrounded by a hood mould. A straight reveal leads to a louvered twin-light window with trefoiled ogee head, and a quatrefoil device above. The south belfry window also contains the tower clock: circular, blue, with gold numerals and hands. The tower parapet is embattled with a pinnacle at each corner. It projects slightly at the eaves and contains one gargoyle each side offset to the right.

The 13th-century north aisle is of limestone and ironstone work, with a string course at the eaves, and a plinth—defined by a simple raised band below the line of the windows—broken by a blocked chamfered and arched doorway to the west end. Both ends of the aisle are supported by clasping buttresses terminated with gables. An angled buttress of the same style sits between the two identical rectangular north windows, each of three lights with cusped ogee heads. The north aisle pointed west window opening has a chamfered reveal and a hood mould, with an inset window of two simple pointed lights. The pointed east window with hood mould is of four lights—two central lights, with cusped heads with quatrefoil device above, define a dropped section of the cill below, with a simple raised pointed light each side. All north aisle windows are clear glazed. Above the aisle runs a plain parapet which meets a raised half gable at the east and west ends.

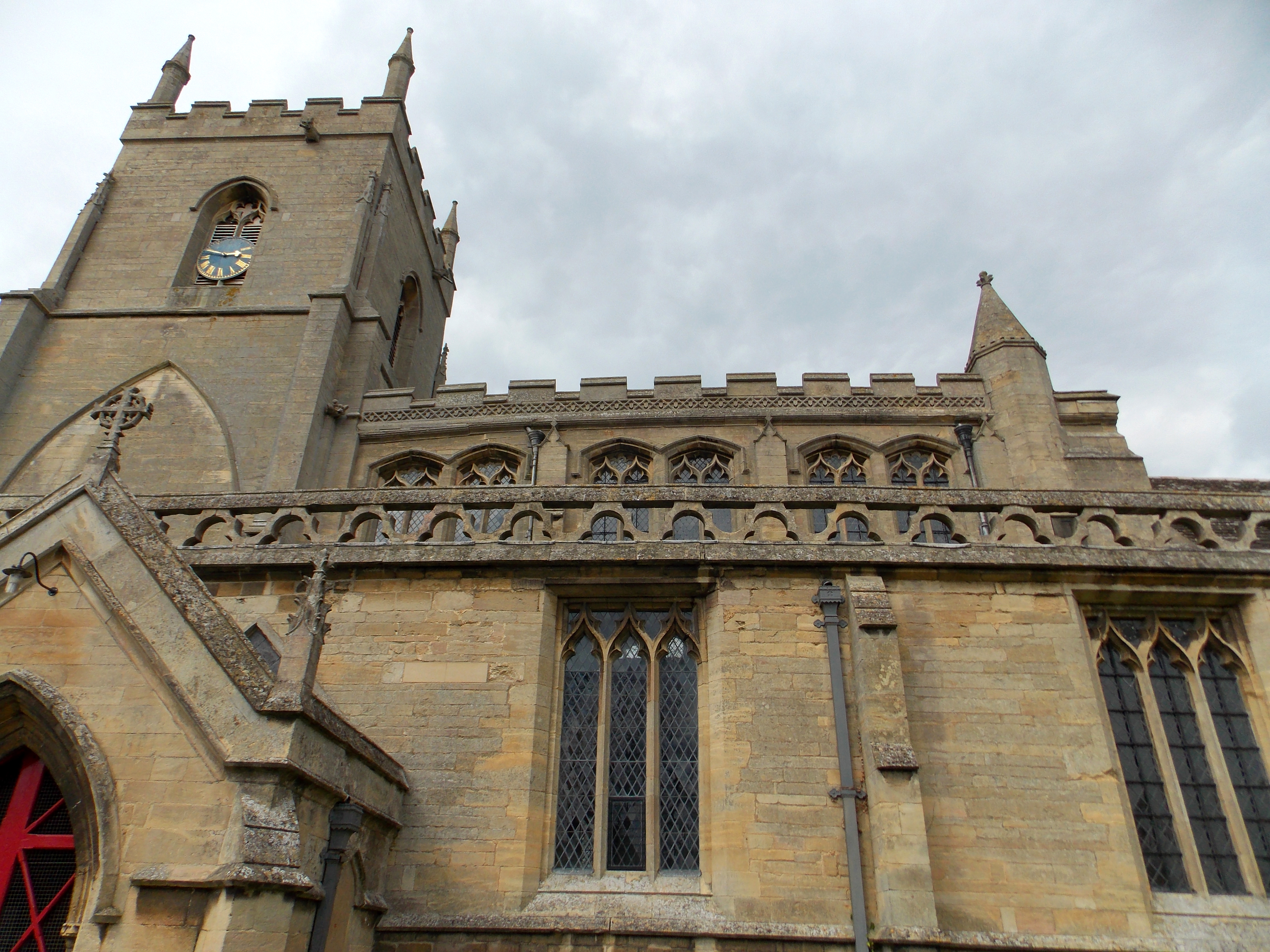
The south aisle with cusped parapet, and clerestory with octagonal turret

The south aisle is early 14th century. It is supported by twin-stepped clasping buttresses at the south-east and south-west corners, and an angle buttress on the south side. A moulded string course runs at the eaves, and a plinth just below the window line. There are five windows: one at the east end; one at the west end; and three at the south with two of these at the west separated by the church porch. The east window is of concave chamfered intersecting 'Y' tracery, creating three lights set within a chamfered pointed arch with hood mould. The west window is similar, but narrower, and of two lights. The south wall windows are identical: rectangular chamfered openings within which are three lights with cusped ogee heads. The parapet is of a coping set above a repeated c.17th-century cusped fretwork device.

The Perpendicular nave is defined at the exterior by its mid-15th-century clerestory. It is of three pairs of windows each side, separated by buttresses as gable-topped pilasters. Each pair is of shallow-arched openings with hood moulds incorporating both. Each window is of two ogee-headed lights and cusping, with central quatrefoils above. The clerestory is topped by an embattled parapet with a diamond frieze below which, at the south-east end, meets an octagonal turret with castelations, faceted spire and finial. This turret houses stairs from the south aisle to the roof. The east end of the nave roof rises to a gable end on which sits a gabled bell-cot, originally for a sanctus bell.

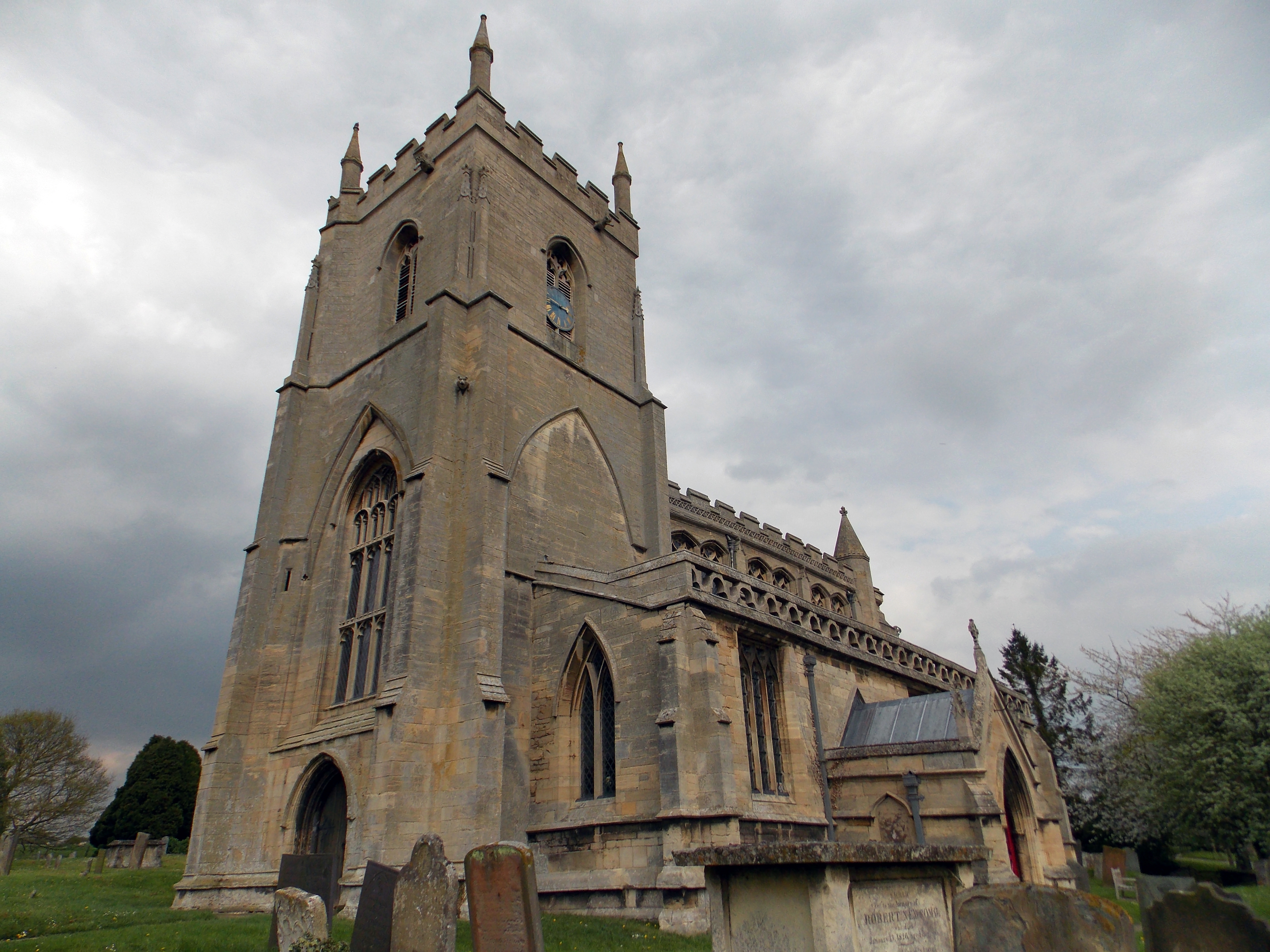
South porch, with south aisle cutting through the earlier blind arch

The chancel is of the 1856 rebuild and restoration. It is of ironstone and limestone work with a Collyweston slate roof. Ashlar is used in the east wall above the spring of the east window, and in the cornerstones and plinth. Twin stepped diagonal buttresses are at the south-east and north-east corners, with a further angled buttress on the south wall. A moulded plinth runs below windows on the east wall, and on the south wall where at the west, it is broken by a pointed doorway with chamfered opening and hood mould; the door is planked with decorative metal face hinges. On the south side are three windows of identical style and construction, with twin lights and 'Y' tracery set within a chamfered pointed arch. The north side contains two identical plain lancet windows. The chancel east window with hood mould is of three lights with intersecting 'Y' tracery within a double-chamfered surround. Immediately to the east of the east window is a table tomb within iron railings, to Mary Skelton (died 1767).

The church south porch is 15th-century. It is a gabled structure with a cross finial at the centre, and crocketed pinnacles at each corner of its south face. It is set on a plinth which runs over diagonal buttresses at the south corners. A string course runs into a hood mould surrounding a blocked pointed window opening at both the east and west side. The pointed doorway arch is hood moulded, and has a continuous chamfered surround meeting a flat reveal, which in turn holds a further roll mould arch ending at the spring with capitals unsupported by piers. Within the porch are stone benches either side. The nave door, with its wrought iron face hinges, sits inside an arched opening with continuous moulded reveal surround, with simple chamfered hood mould above.

=== Interior ===
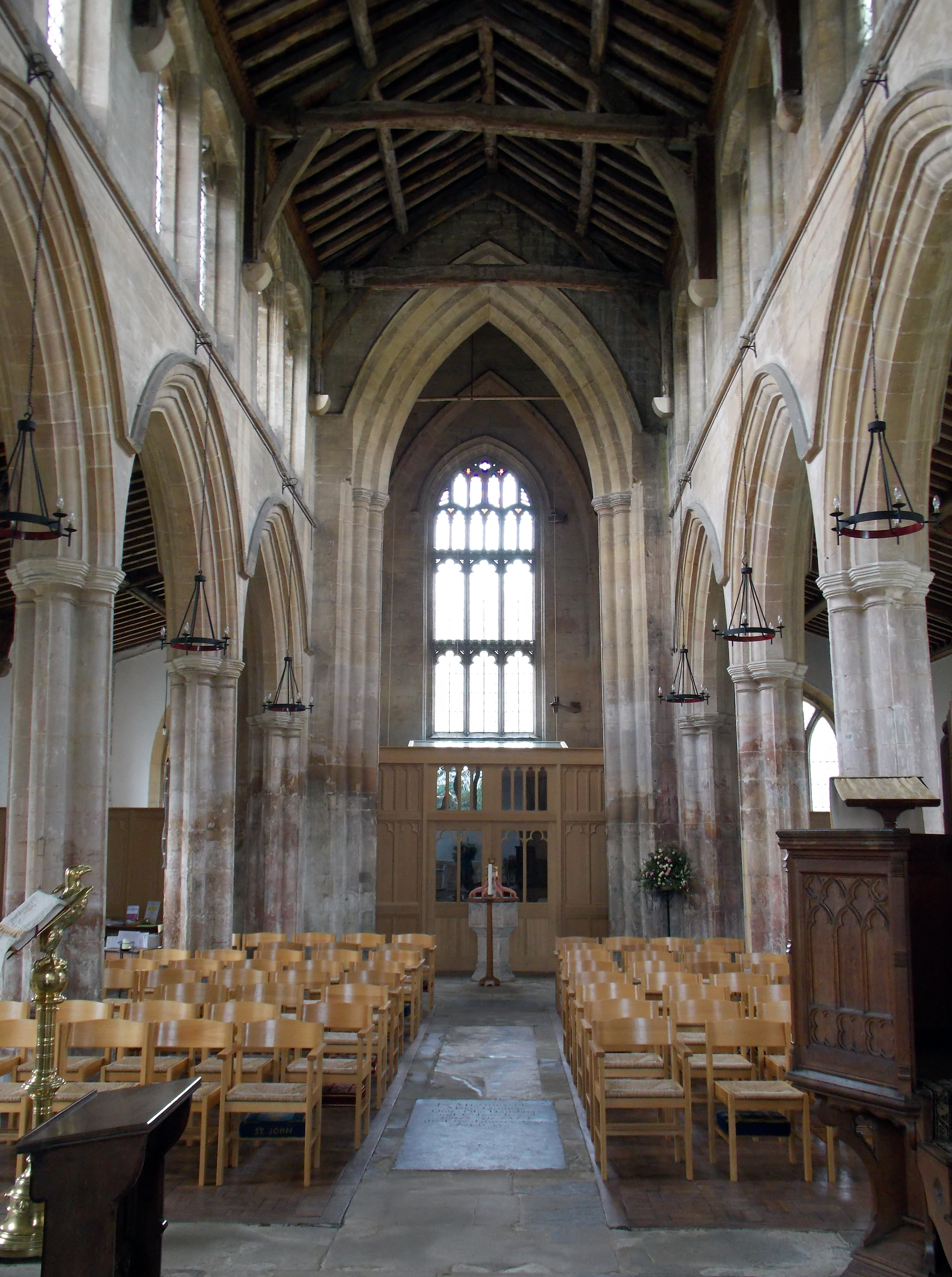
Tower arch from the nave

The tall c.13th-century tower arch is of a continuous triple chamfer leading to triple part-circular shafts terminating in moulded capitals at the height of the nave clerestory. A hood mould surrounds the arch to the same height of the blocked arches in the north, west and east sides. It finishes at the spring with the same open cusped devices as found on the equivalent internal arches on each side, and that on the external west wall. The plank door to the stair turret is at the north west, and sits within a continuous surround mould with pointed head. The lower part of the tower arch, behind which is a meeting room, is closed off by a 20th-century wood screen of traceried panels, the central of which are open above a glazed double door. Within the tower, on the north side is a restored arched Hanoverian royal coat of arms. The tower contains one bell by Thomas Newcombe of Leicester (c.1550) and three by Tobias Norris of Stamford (1611; 1622; c.1683). Only three of the bells are used today.

The nave north and south arcades leading to the north and south aisles are of three bays each, and date to the 13th century. The arcade pointed arches, of double-faceted flat and rounded mouldings, sit on piers incorporating four rounded columns each with a central raised flat projection continuous along the full length. Between each rounded column is a continuous annulet (flat hollow). The piers' capitals and abaci are flat-faced Doric of five sides; the deep base octagonal and moulded. A continuous hood mould runs above the arches throughout each arcade. The 15th-century nave roof is of tie beam construction; it was restored in the 19th century when stone corbels and cross braces were replaced. Within the nave, beneath the tower arch, is a 14th-century octagonal font (PastScape: 15th-century). The stone plinth and bowl is panelled on each side: the plinth with plain recessed fields, each alternate with carved twin flower-head reliefs; the bowl with panels of carved quatrefoils with inset shields, alternating with blind tracery. A font cover is of plain wood, with eight raised pink open scrolls attached meeting an octagonal shaft topped by a gold-painted urn.

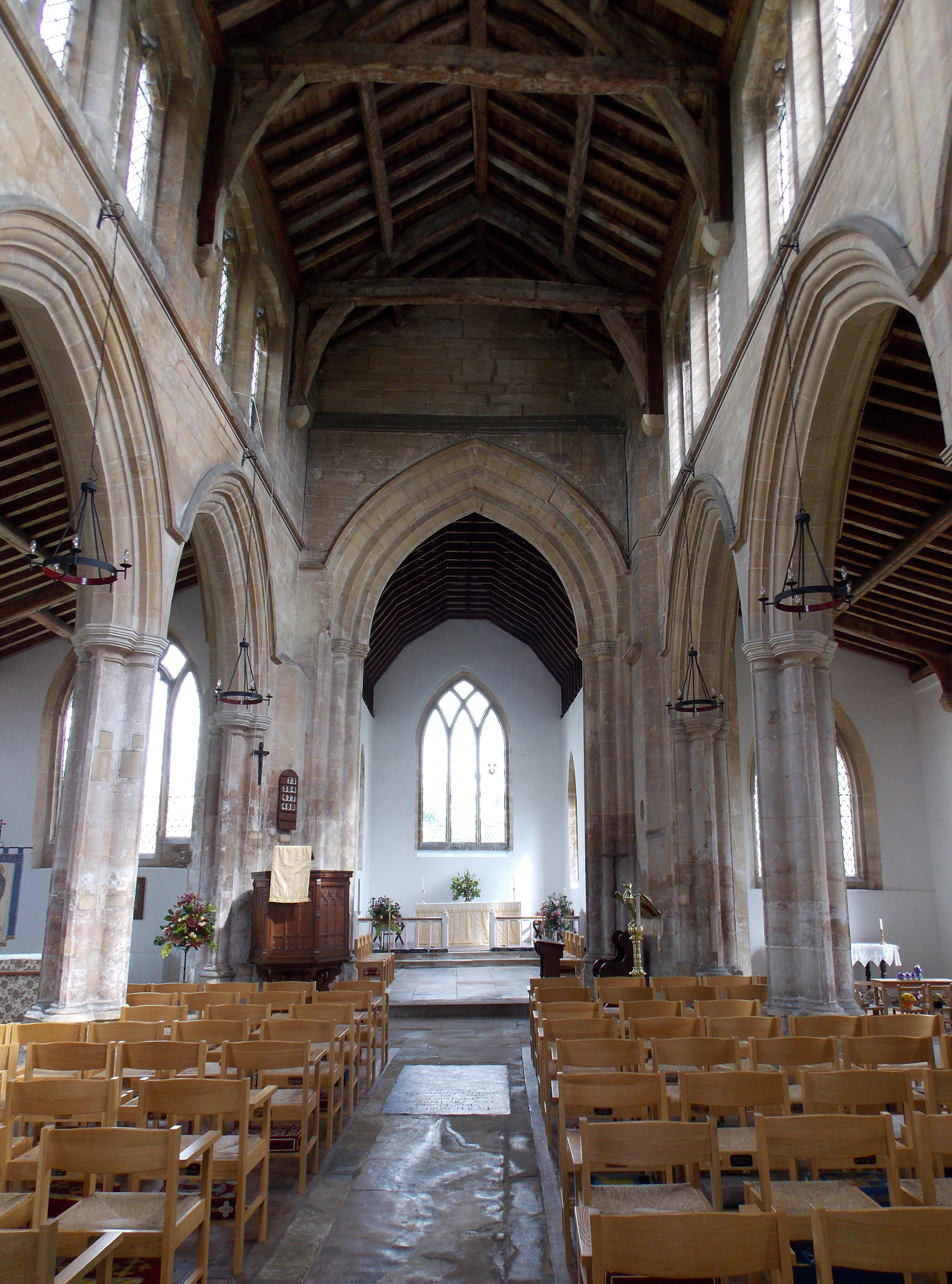
Chancel arch from the nave

The pointed chancel arch is 13th century. It is moulded of three chamfers leading to responds—half-piers against a wall supporting an arch—of three part round columns with continuous annulet between, and with polygonal capitals and base reflecting those of the arcade piers. At the spring of the arch are open cusped devices similar to those on the tower arch. The chancel roof is 19th century and of barrel vault construction. In the north wall of the chancel is a rectangular aumbry. In the south wall is an arched door, of planking over cross bracing and heavy surrounds, recessed within a plain right angle opening with pointed and chamfered double-arch head. From the 19th-century restoration are chancel altar rails, choir stalls, a brass eagle lectern, and a wood pulpit. The pulpit is octagonal with one side open and receiving steps. The upper level is moulded top and bottom, with each side paneled with inset tracery and quatrefoils, and is supported by scrolled brackets set on an inset base.

The 13th-century south aisle contains the church square-paneled and plank south door, that is recessed to the same style as the chancel south door. A further small plank door at the south aisle north-east wall is within a pointed doorway with a continuous moulded surround, an entrance to a previous rood loft, defined externally by the south aisle turret. To the east of the door are twin aumbries. In the south wall is a 14th-century piscina with cusped head, set within an ogee headed recess. The north aisle, also 13th-century, contains within the north side of the chancel arch pier a further piscina with a seven-cusped arch surround with spandrels within a rectilinear frame, this sitting on a projecting ledge, with above, an entablature containing three floriate carvings; running on the entablature are crenellations. In the north wall is a further aumbry with wooden door. At the west end of the north aisle sits the church organ.

== Memorials ==
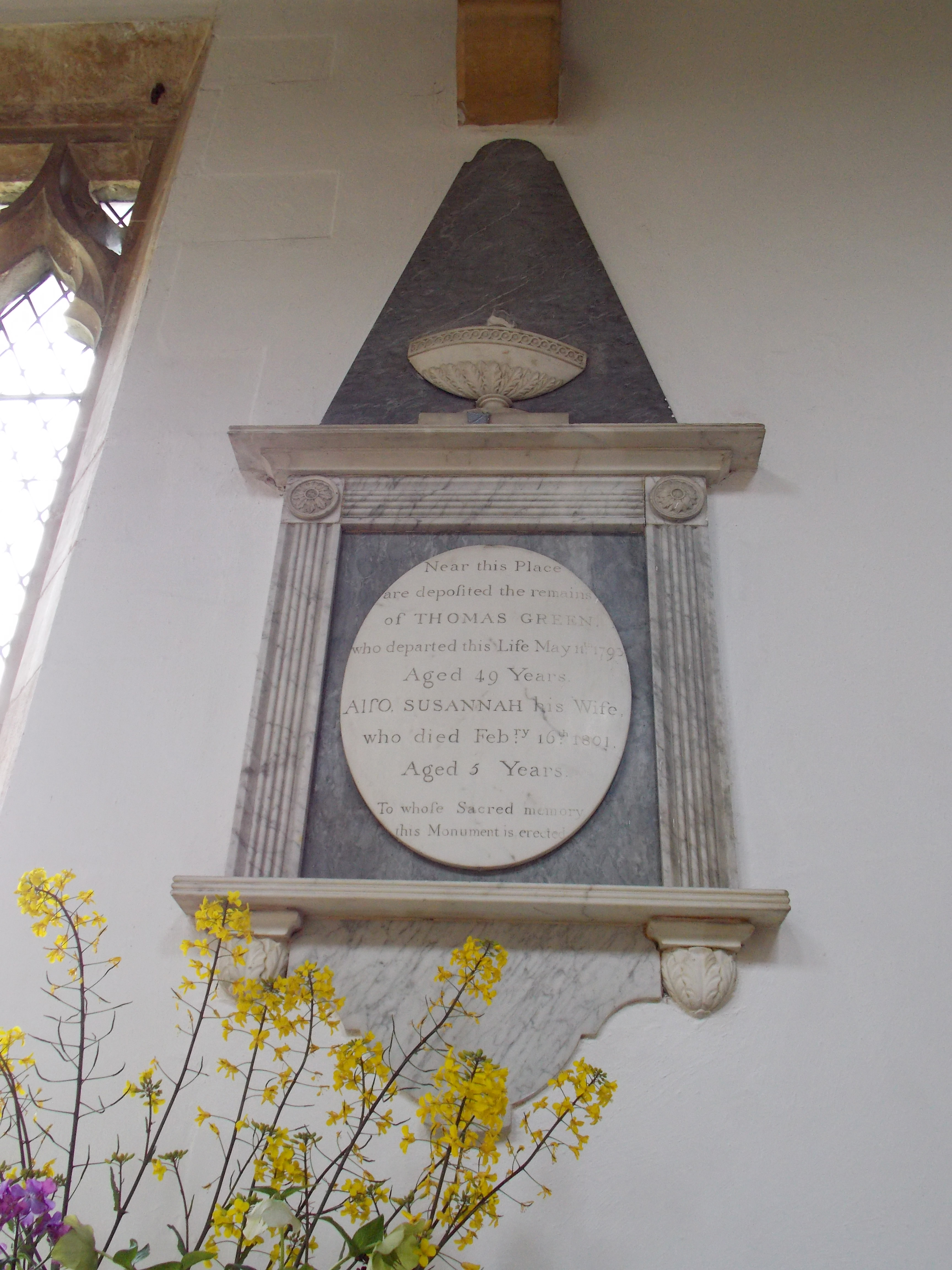
Tablet to Thomas Green, and his wife aged 5 [sic]

On the south aisle south wall at the west end is a white marble memorial tablet with entablature, set on a grey marble surround, to Samuel Darby (died 1819), and his wife, Frances (died 1837). To its east is a wall memorial as an oval white marble plaque set on a grey marble field, set within a fluted pilaster frame with flower-head devices at the top corners. The plaque is supported below by a fluted shelf held by floriate-carved corbels, with apron between. Above the pilasters is a shelf on which sits a carved marble relief chalice with decorative friezing. This memorial is to Thomas Green, who died 1793, and his wife, Susannah, who died 1801, aged 5 years [sic]. Further to the east is a grey marble oval plaque supported by a single scrolled corbel, to Colby Graves (died 1799, aged 17), and his mother Grace Graves (died 1824, aged 75). The most eastern south aisle tablet is a white marble memorial on a black marble ground with urn above, to Samuel Newzam (died 1826); his wife, Ann (died 1799); his and Ann's sons, John (died 1788), and Henry (died 1802).

North aisle wall memorials include a tablet at the east end, of white marble on black marble ground, to Joseph Barwis (died 1828), Aslackby vicar from 1798, and his wife, Bridget (died 1834). At the apposite end of the aisle is an oval white marble tablet to Colby Graves (died 1791, aged 41).

A black memorial floor slab in the nave is to Mary Quincy (died 1780, aged 88), a co-heiress of John Quincy. A further small black nave slab is to John Edward Oldham (1808-1846). On the chancel north wall is a pink marble plaque dedicated to eleven Aslackby men who died in the First World War. The memorial is repeated twice in the nave at the south of the tower arch, by a framed brass plaque and a printed and framed Roll of Honour. Within the south porch is a handwritten dedication to all Aslackby men who served in the "European War" of 1914 to 1919, signed by Rev Robert Stanley Coupland and churchwardens, referring to the tower memorial church clock erected in 1920 for this purpose.

== Priests ==
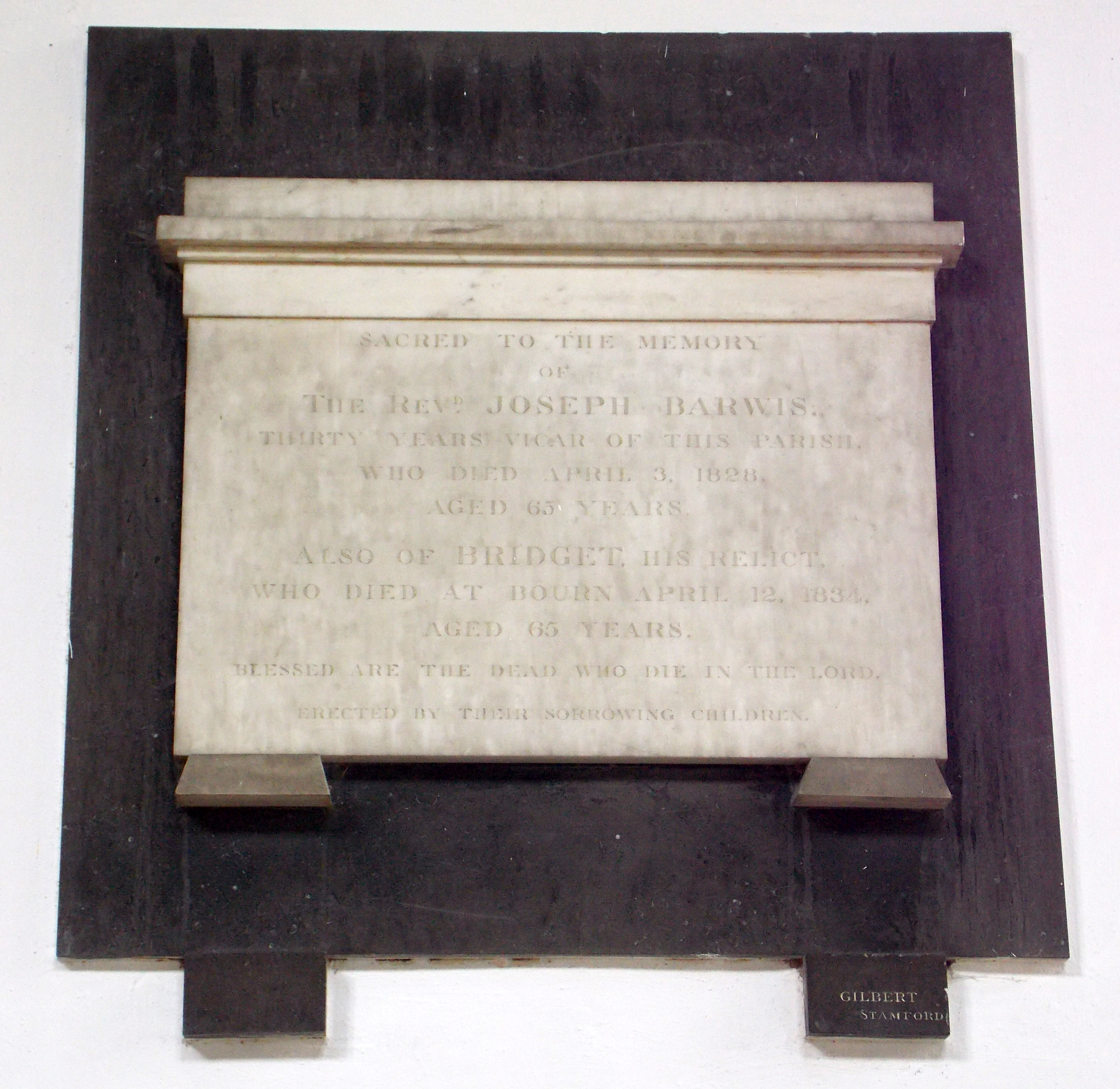
North aisle tablet to Rev Joseph Barwis, St James' vicar from 1798 to 1828

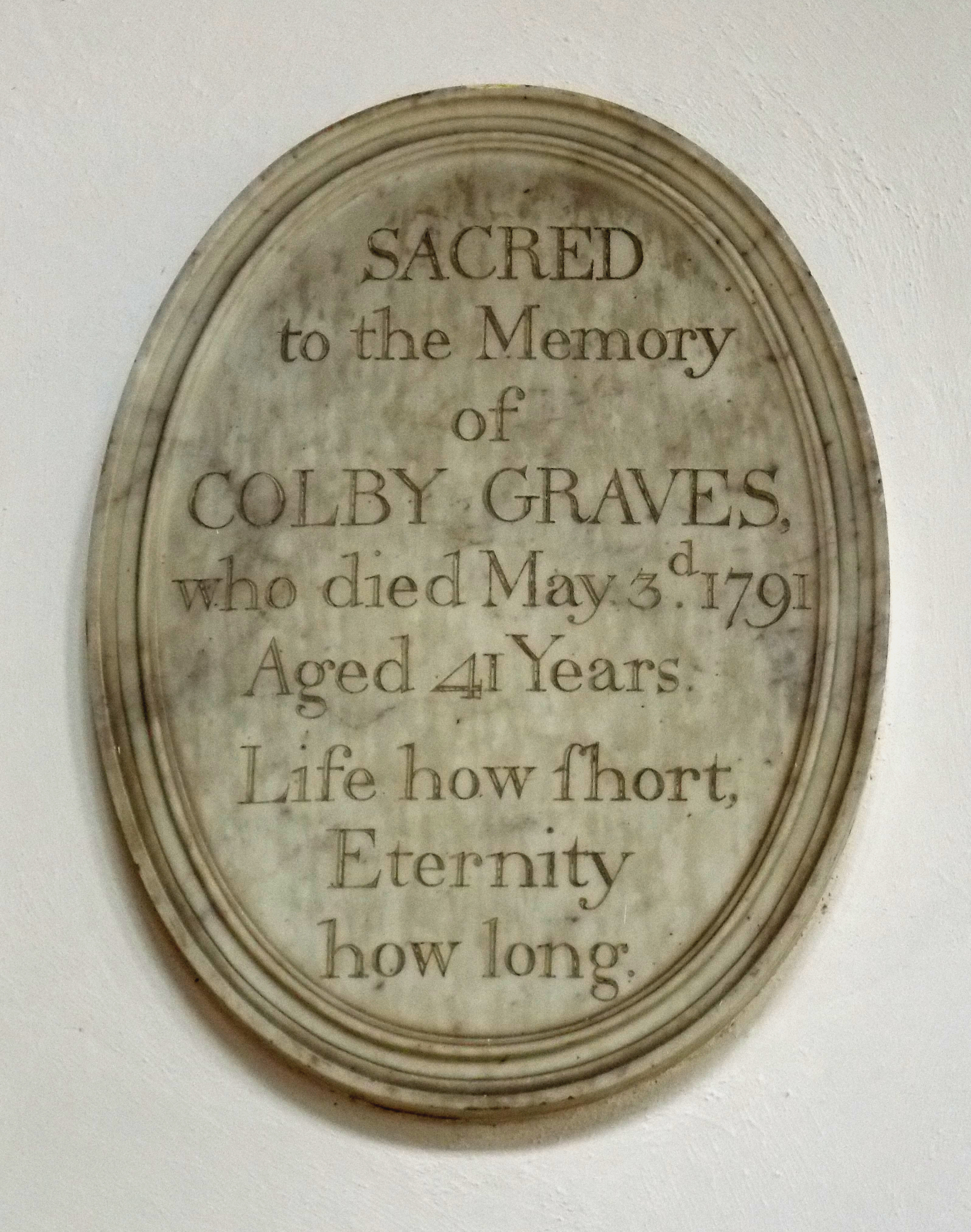
North aisle tablet to Colby Graves

List of priests, and parish rectors, vicars and curates, from the Clergy of the Church of England database, church commemorative plaques and listings, and Kelly's Directory for Lincolnshire 1855/1885/1896/1905/1909/1919/1933.

- 1225 – Geoffrey de Temple. Patron: Knights Templar
- 1226 – Ralph de Caurnell
- 1233 – Geoffrey de Beckingham. Patron: Knights Templar
- 1237 – William de Aldabois. Patron: Knights Templar
- 1279 – Magister John de Melton. Patron: Knights Templar
- 1279 – William de Doursely. Patron: Knights Templar
- 1300 – William
- 1301 – Charles de Estuyk. Patron: William de la Nene, Master of the Temple
- 1320 – Thomas
- 1321 – Nicholas de Camelton. Patron: Knights Hospitaller

Secession and break with Rome (1534), and dissolution of the monasteries (1536–41)

- ????-1542 – Radulpus Smalle (vicar)
- 1542-44 – Johannes Williamson LL.B. (vicar). Patron: Nicolaus Wilson
- 1544-51 – Thomas Ellis (vicar). Patrons: Laurence Lawland / John Beche
- 1551 – Alyn Echard (curate)
- 1557 – Robert Maryborne. Patron: Edward Clinton, 1st Earl of Lincoln
- 1557-1605 – Thomas Stevenson (vicar). Patrons: Anthony Dickenson / Miles Mordinge
- 1557-85 – Sir Robert Mawborne or Mayborne (vicar). Patron: Sir Edward Fynes
- 1585-1605 – Alexander Mawborne or Maborne (vicar; reader to 1597)
- 1605-11 – Ralph Palfreyman BA (vicar). Patron: Henry Clinton, 2nd Earl of Lincoln
- 1611-14 – George Wayt BA (vicar)
- 1614 – Mathew Mitchell (schoolmaster)
- 1614 – Samuel Asheton (vicar) Patron: Richard Neile, Bishop of Lincoln
- 1614-27 – Samuel Assheton (vicar) Patron: Theophilus Clinton, 4th Earl of Lincoln
- 1621 – John Graye (curate)
- 1622-24 – Thomas Griffith (curate)
- 1627-62 – Baronian or Barjonas Dove BA (vicar). Patron: Theophilus Clinton, 4th Earl of Lincoln

Interregnum (1649)
Restoration (1660)

- 1673 – Richard Kelham BA, Emmanuel College, Cambridge, MA (curate)
- 1702 – Robert Clipsham (vicar)
- 1702-21 – Thomas Raven (vicar). Patron: John Garland
- 1711 – Richard Lee
- 1721-53 – Charles Bywater BA, St John's College, Cambridge (vicar). Patron: Daniel Douglas
- 1749 – Charles Hyett
- 1753-94 – John Wheatley BA, Christ's College, Cambridge, MA (vicar). Patron: Michael Barstow
- 1758 – Thomas Whitaker BA, Emmanuel College, Cambridge (curate)
- 1794-97 – Francis Barstow MA, Emmanuel College, Cambridge (vicar). Patron: Francis Barstow
- 1798-1828 – Joseph Barwis (vicar). Patron: Sir George Pretyman Tomline, Bishop of Lincoln
- 1829 – Richard Lee SLC, Lincoln College, Oxford (vicar). Patron: Francis Barstow
- 1839 – William Stanton
- 1840 – William Gurden Moore
- 1851 – Edmund Alderson MA (vicar; curate in 1845)
- 1875 – J. Christopherson
- 1876 – John Smithson Barstow MA, Queen's College, Oxford
- 1906 – Robert Stanley Coupland
- 19?? – John Smithson Barstow
- 1950 – Arthur M. Dutton
- 1959 – T. Street
- 1988 – Raymond Harris
- 1995 – Christopher Wilson
- 2003 – Anna K. Sorensen

== Gallery ==
Gallery

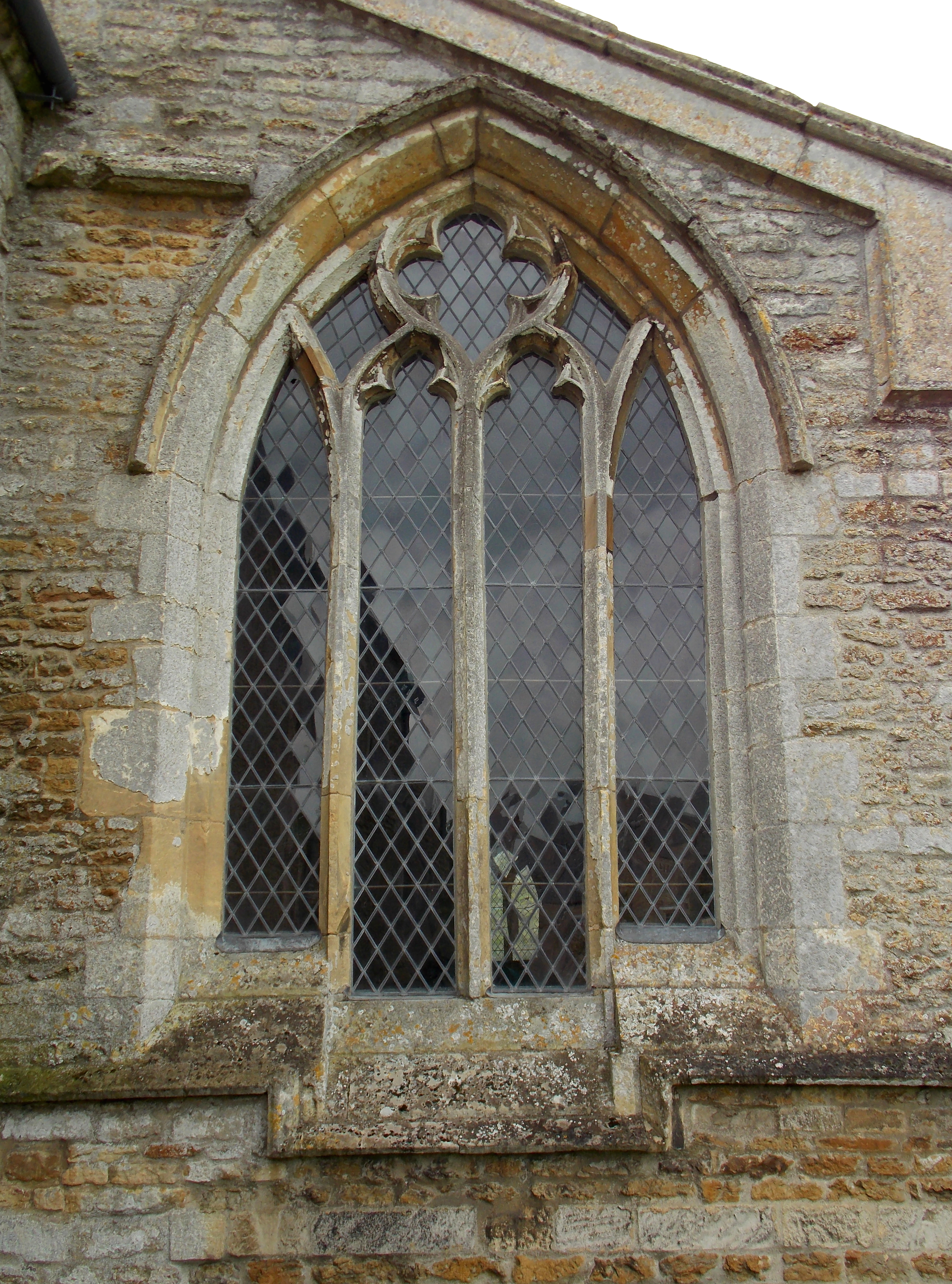
North aisle east window

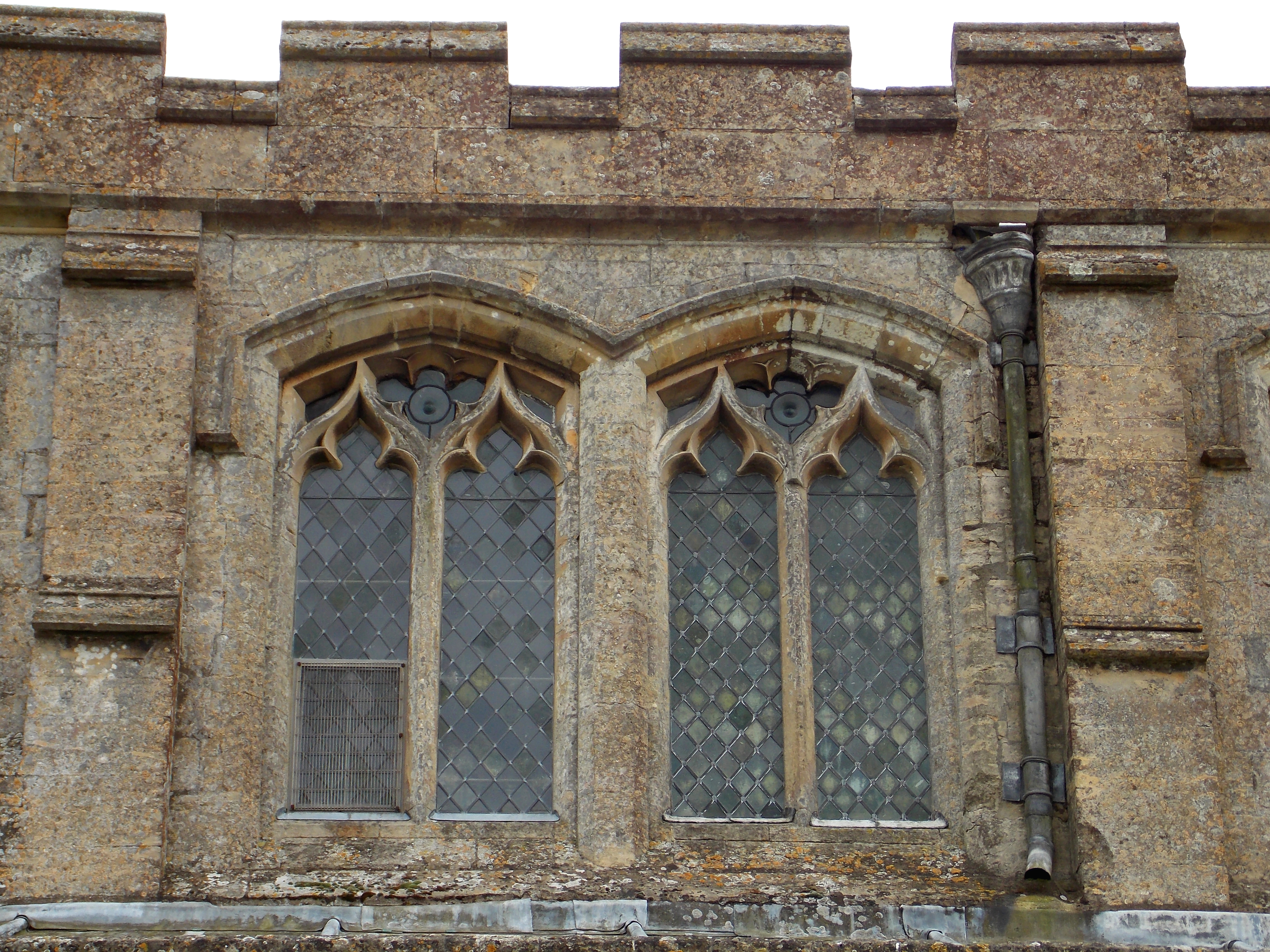
North clerestory windows

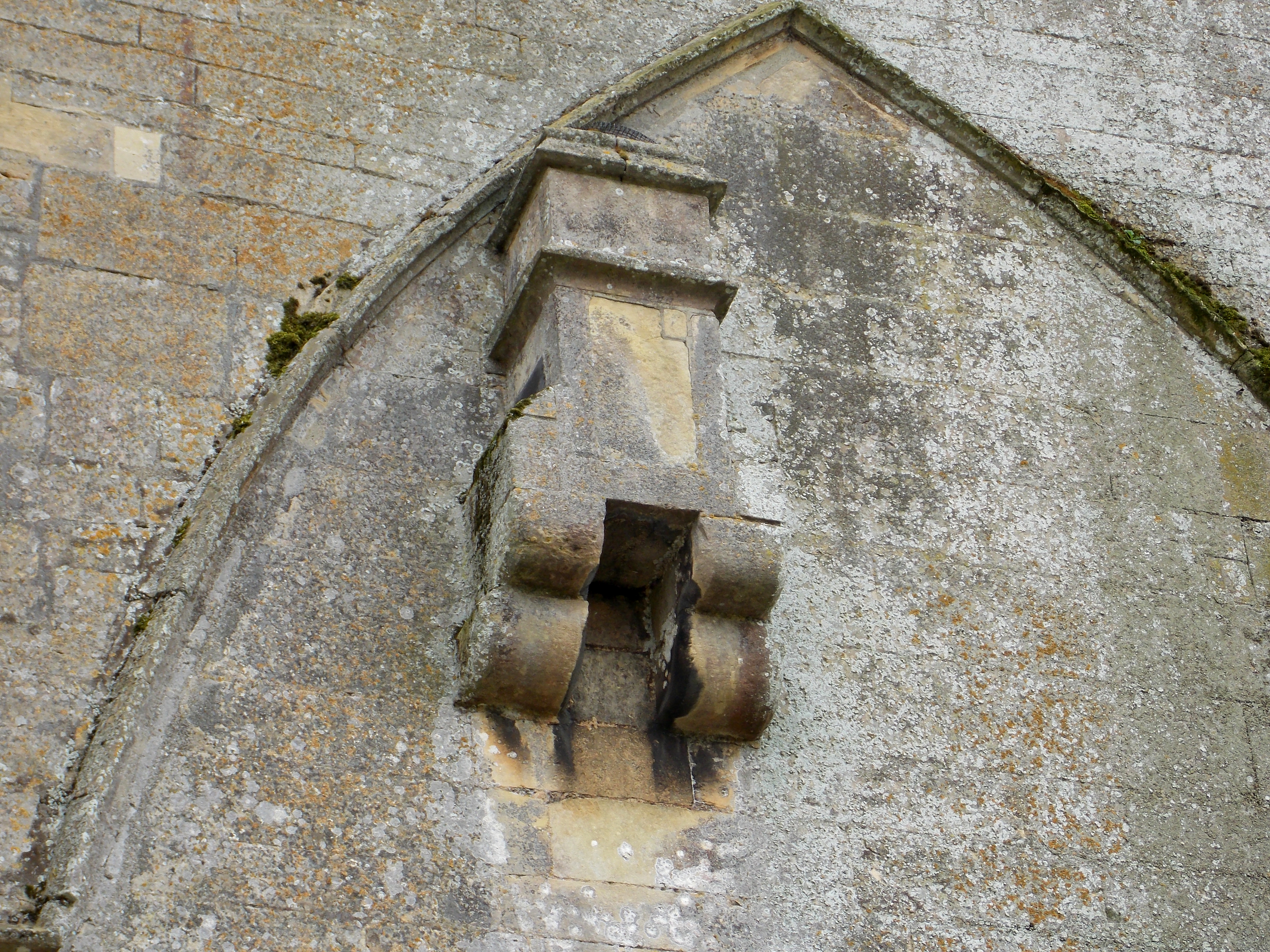
Flue from historic heating system within the north blind arch on the tower

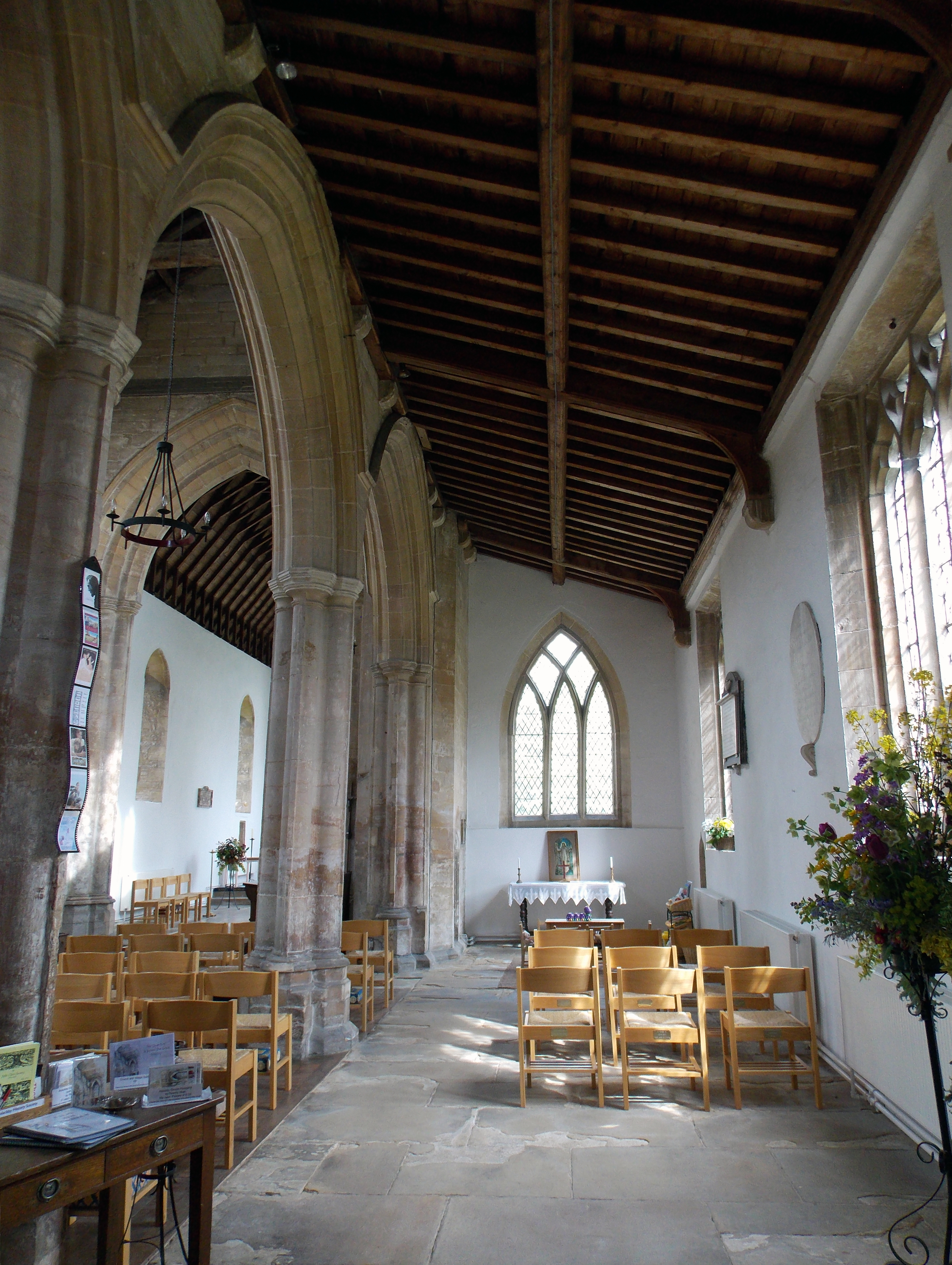
South aisle from the west

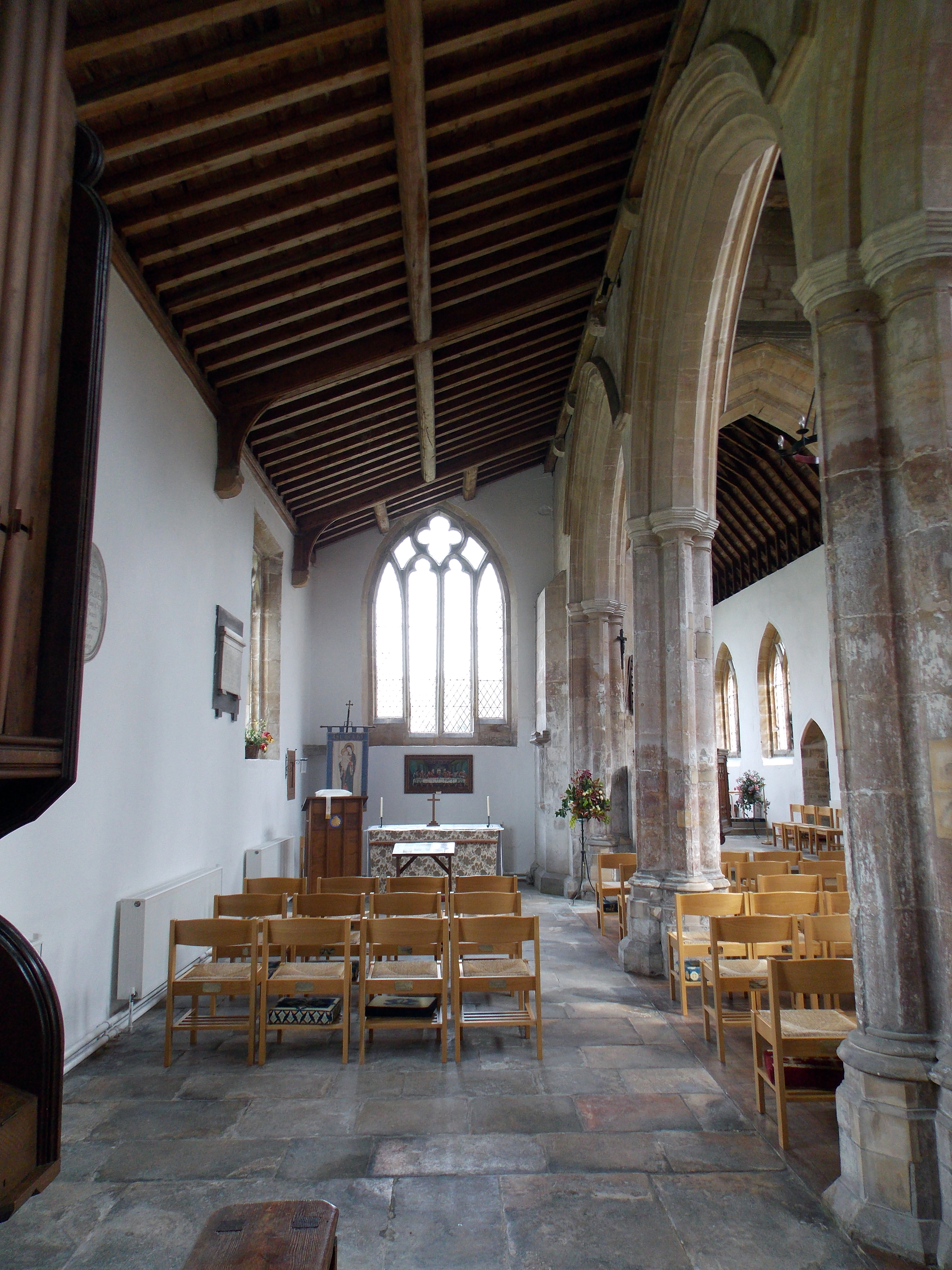
North aisle from the west

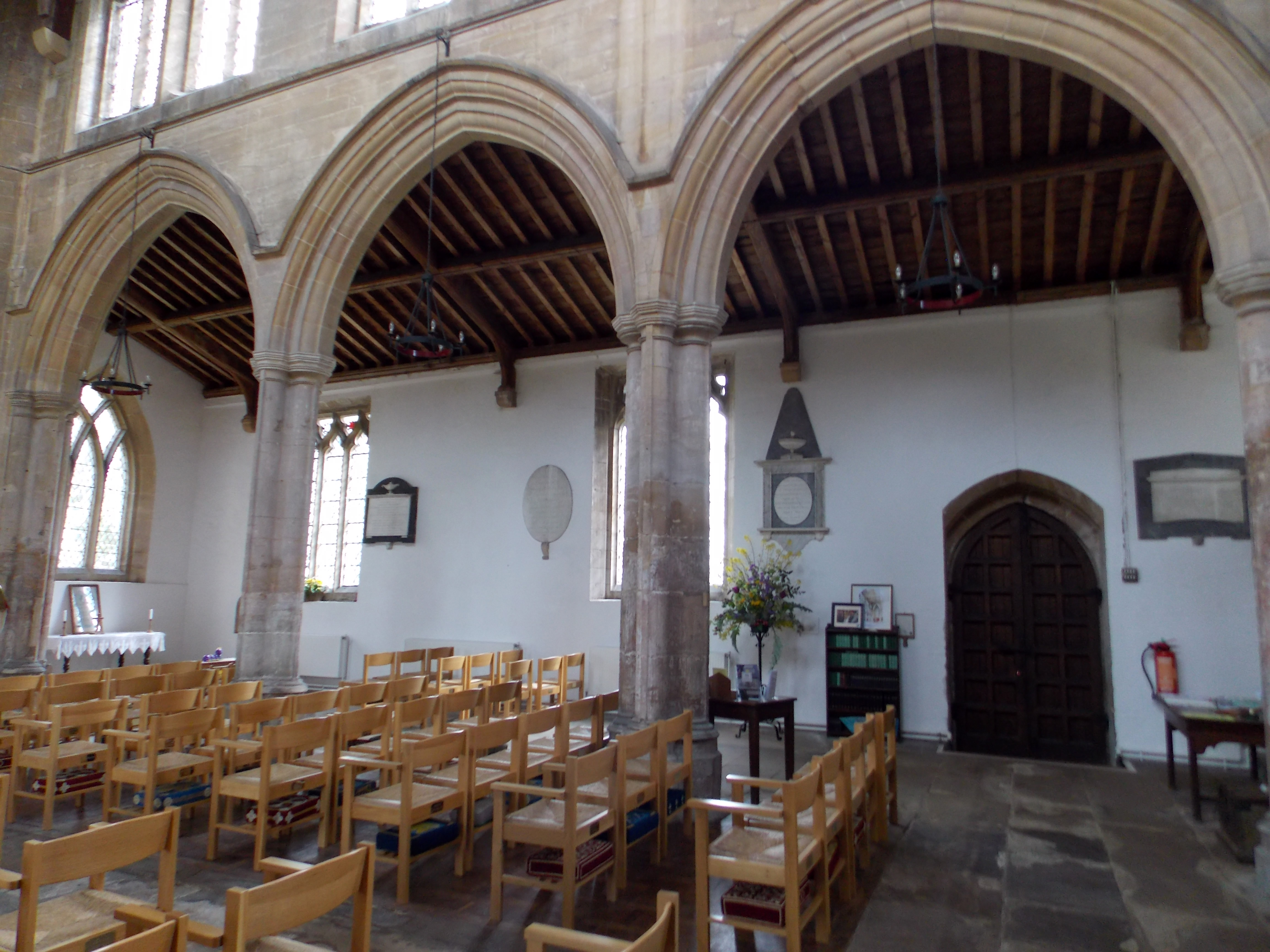
South aisle and arcade from the nave

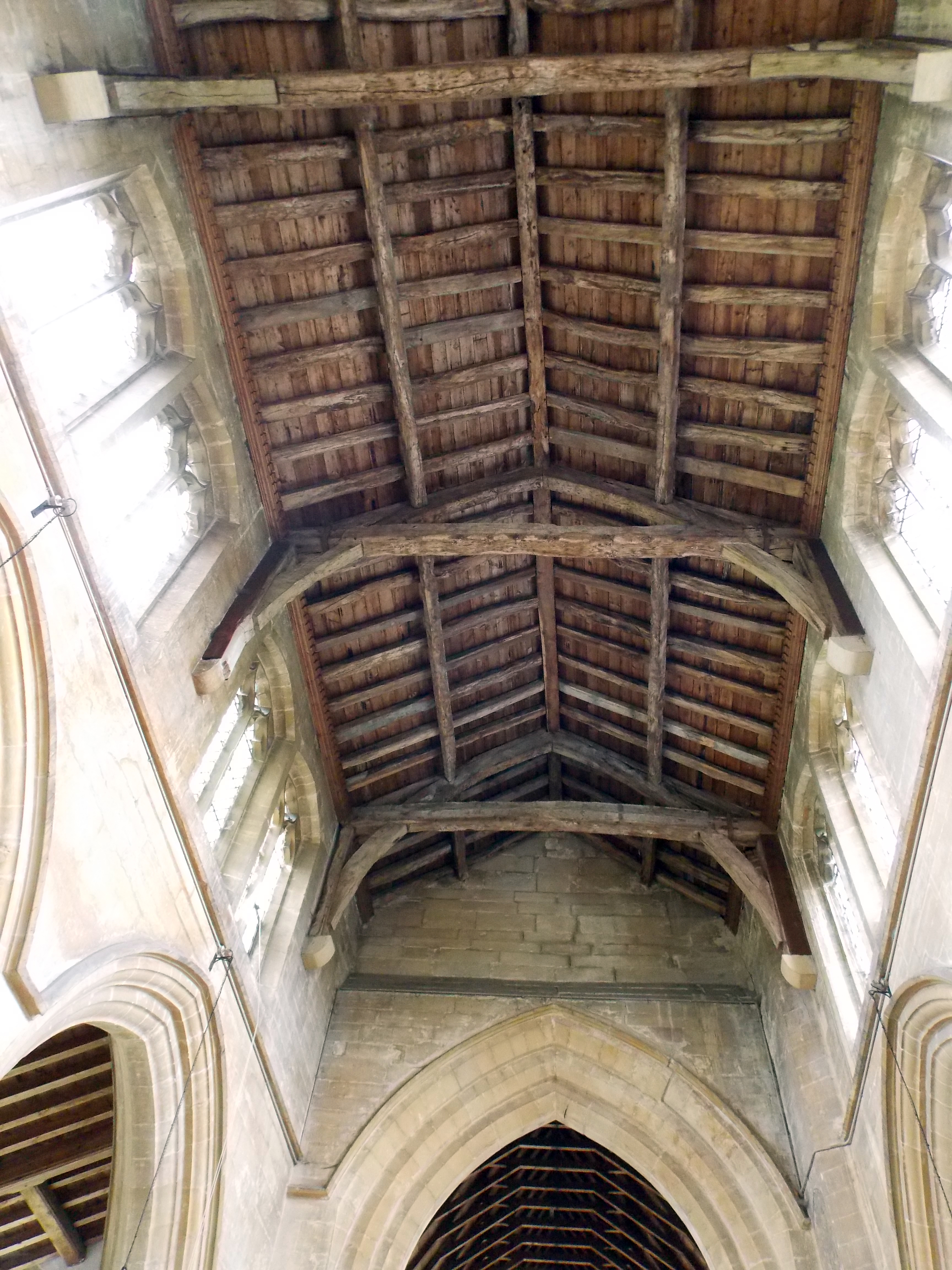
Nave tie beam roof

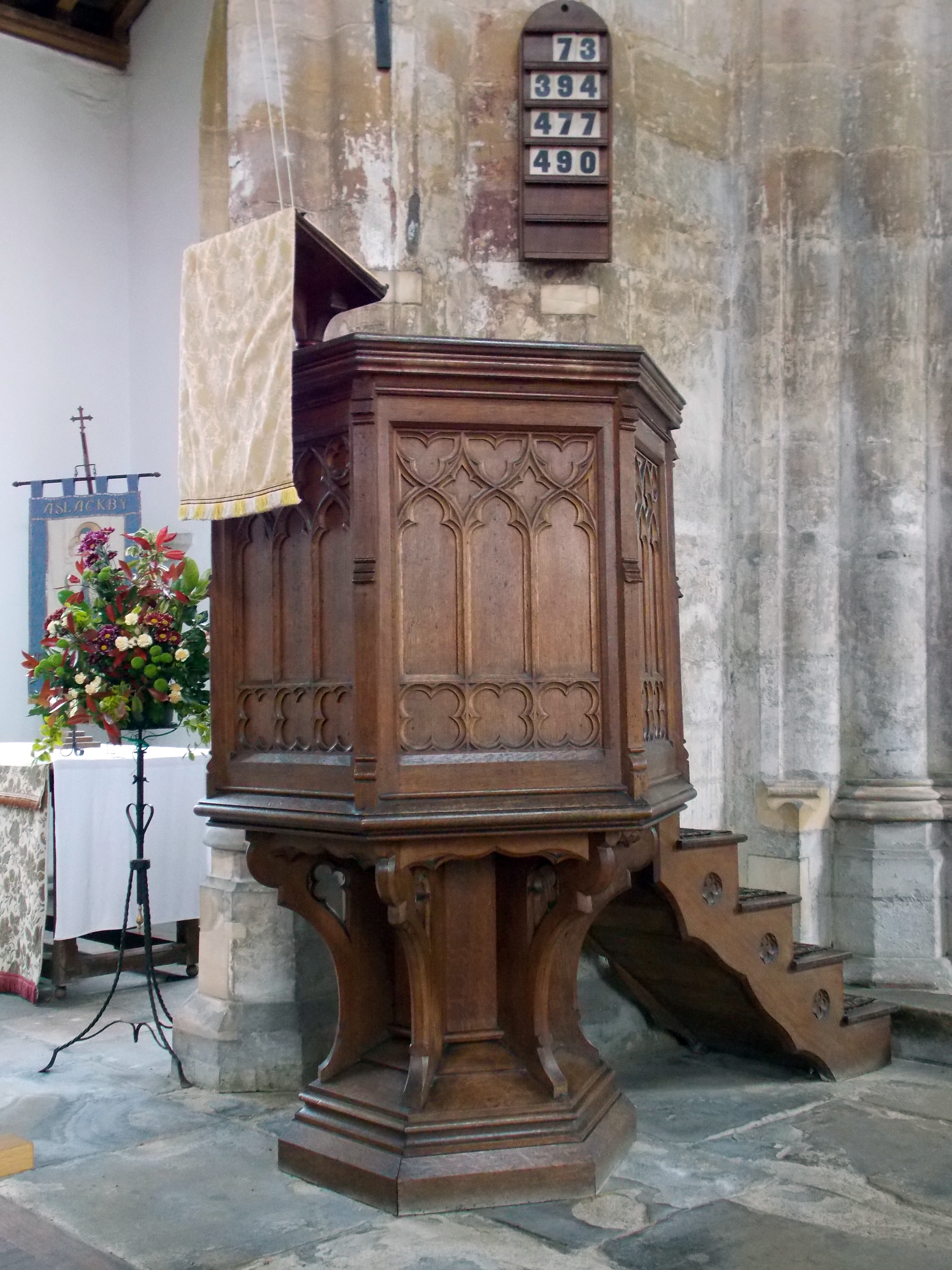
Pulpit

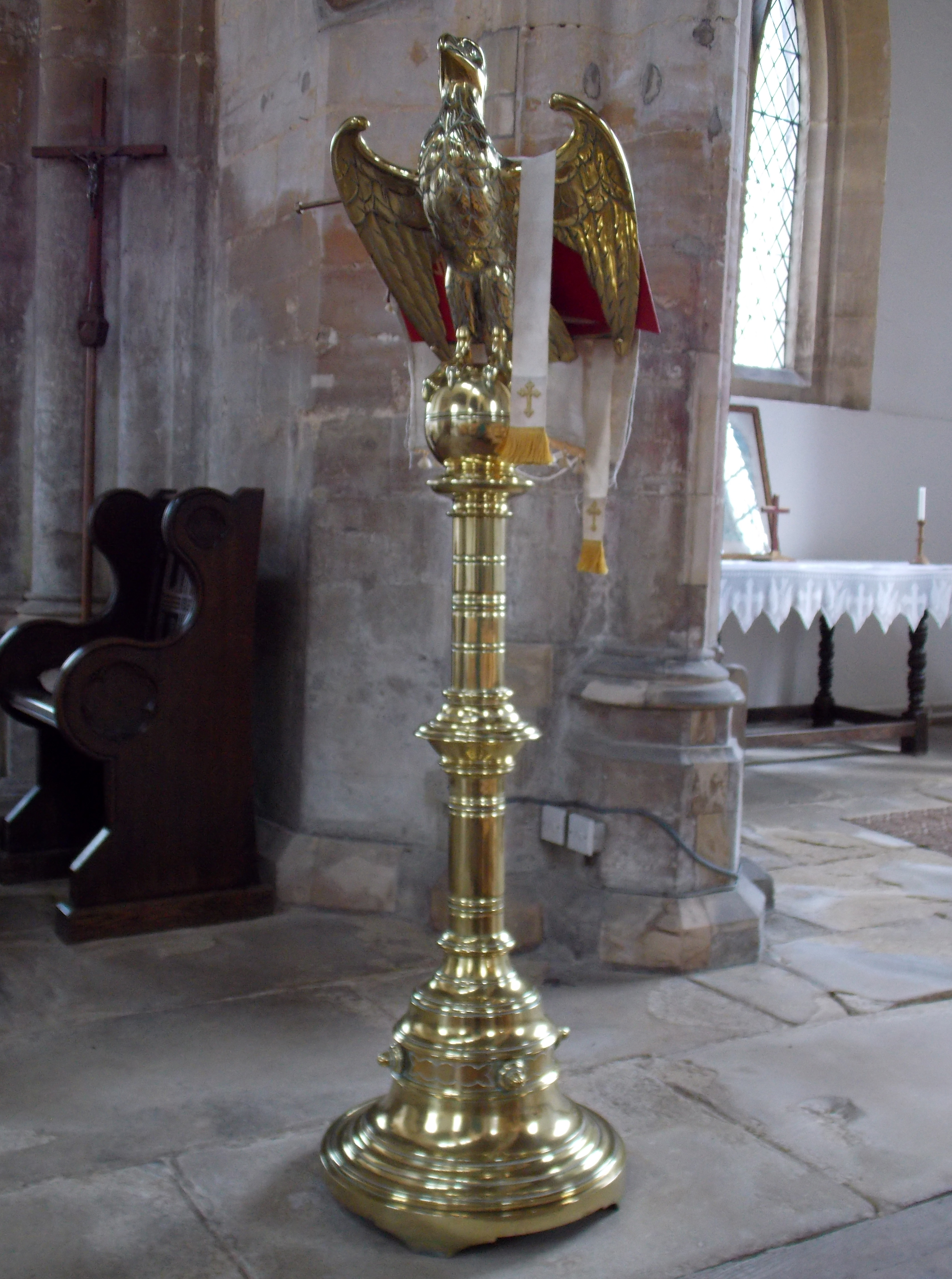
Eagle lectern

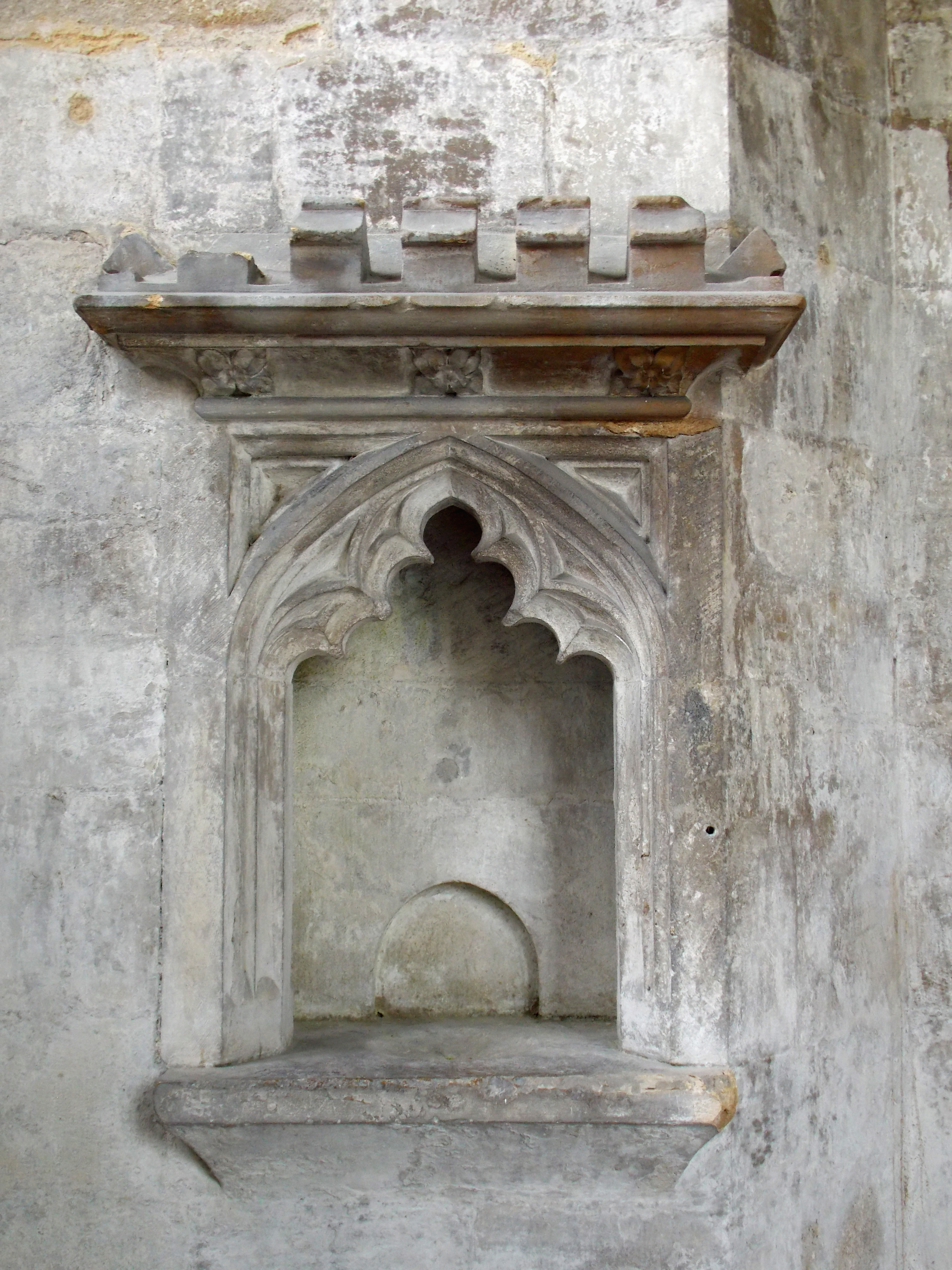
North aisle aumbry
