= St Andrew's Church, Billingborough =

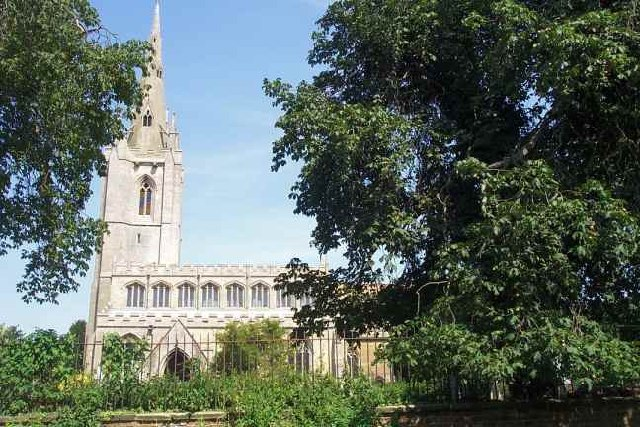
- Church of St Andrew, Billingborough
- St Andrew's Church, Billingborough
- 52.894053°N 0.339766°W
- OS grid reference: TF 11788 34244
- Country: England
- Denomination: Church of England
- Previous denomination: Roman Catholic

History
- Founded: 1251 or 1312
- Dedication: St Andrew

Architecture
- Heritage designation: Grade I
- Designated: 1968
- Architectural type: Perpendicular, Decorated

Specifications
- Capacity: 375
- Materials: limestone, rubble

Administration
- Province: Canterbury
- Diocese: Diocese of Lincoln
- Deanery: Deanery of Lafford
- Parish: Billingborough

St Andrew's Church is a Grade I listed Anglican parish church dedicated to Andrew the Apostle, in Billingborough, Lincolnshire, England. The church is 7 miles (11 km) south-east from Sleaford, and at the western edge of the Lincolnshire Fenlands.

St Andrew's is in the ecclesiastical parish of Billingborough, and is part of the Billingborough Group of churches in the Deanery of Lafford, and the Diocese of Lincoln.

== History ==
There was a church at Billingborough in the 11th century, noted in the 1086 Domesday Book. The present St Andrew's dates from 1251 according to one source, and 1312 to another, with later additions to the late 15th century, and with restorations carried out in 1868 and 1891. The church parish register dates from 1561.

In 1717 Henry Penn of Peterborough installed five bells in the church. The bells were re-hung in 1846 within a replaced wooden frame, and a further treble bell was added in 1914 within a new steel frame installed by John Taylor and Co of Loughborough. The nave was re-roofed in 1870 at a cost of £780, and in 1887 new oak benches and a carved pulpit were added, and the aisles repaved. In 1891 the early 14th-century chancel was rebuilt—the previous chancel contained a barn roof brought from Birthorpe—and, in 1892, a window at the east was added to the memory of the late Duke of Clarence, who died 14 January the same year. A reredos was added in 1894, its sides extended in 1913. New stained glass was incorporated into the west window in 1912 by Lieutenant Colonel Albert De Burton, and the church organ was restored in 1929 at a cost of £200.

The earliest record of a Church of England rector at Billingborough is of John Jackson, parish priest from 1546 to 1577. The Revd Robert Kelham, buried 4 May 1752, was for 50 years the vicar of Billingborough with Threekingham and Walcot, and village schoolmaster from 1704. His son, another Robert Kelham, who died aged 91 in 1808, was an author and antiquarian, and a lawyer at Lincoln's Inn, who wrote an illustrated version of the Domesday Book and a dictionary of Norman language. In 1855 the living was a vicarage, valued at £295, with 139 acres (0.6 km^{2}) of glebe land in the gift of Earl Fortescue, held by William Moxon Mann BA, as the incumbent parish priest. The Revd John Kynaston MA, of Christ Church, Oxford became parish priest during 1855 and was still in post by 1885. By the 1930s the living had become the gift of the Crown, with the Revd Samuel Skelhorn LTh, of Durham University, as priest.

St Andrew's received an English Heritage Grade I listing in 1968, and is part of Billingborough's Heritage at Risk and Conservation Area, designated in 1997.

The church became part of the Gilbertine Benefice of Lafford Deanery in 2010, linking St Andrew's to the churches of Aslackby, Dowsby, Horbling and Pointon with Sempringham.

A 2011 fundraising effort was set in place to provide money to "make safe the timber that supports the bells." The cost of repairs to the bell support structure was estimated at £4000, and events were organised to this end. Repair work was also required to stained glass windows following vandalism around the same time.

== Architecture ==
=== Exterior ===
St Andrew's is of ashlar-faced limestone and rubble construction. It comprises a chancel, nave, north and south aisles, tower with spire, and a south porch, and is of Early English, and Early and Late Perpendicular and Decorated styles.

Recessed and set at the north-west of the church is a mid-14th-century Decorated and embattled tower with corner buttresses. A stair turret to the upper parts of the tower is part of the larger polygonal south-west buttress. The tower contains six bells, and a clock on both east and west sides, below pointed-arch bell openings on all four sides. Two gargoyles set on each side of the tower drain the roof. On each of the four corners are ornate crocketed pinnacles, supported by slight flying buttresses attached to the Decorated 150 feet (46 m) octagonal spire. Cox describes the church as "...remarkable for the height of its slender spire...", and Kelly's, "...tower and spire, remarkable for the narrowness and height of the former in proportion to the latter." The spire has three tiers of lucarnes in alternating positions around its flat faces.

The nave parapet is embattled with corner pinnacles, with "a fine set of clerestory windows... so close together that there is much more glass than stone" (Cox). The 15th-century Perpendicular clerestory windows, eight each at the north and south, contain three cusped lights. The nave roof is slate, as is that of the 19th-century chancel. The pointed gabled south porch dates from about 1312, and contains a pointed-arch entrance opening. Its church south door within has 14th-century ironwork on its lock. The porch is lit by mullioned side windows, its interior containing a stone bench at each side.

=== Interior ===
St Andrew's accommodates seating for 375. The nave includes early 14th-century arcades with quatrefoil piers, comprising three bays at the north, and four at the south. The south aisle, which date is that of the porch, retains a piscina and locker at its east end. Within the 19th-century chancel is a piscina of the same date.

Two further stained glass windows to that dedicated to the Duke of Clarence, and that supplied by Albert De Burton, are one in the south aisle to the memory of a Dr Blasson, and one in the chancel to Lieutenant C. R. Winckley, son of a former vicar who was killed in action during the First World War. In the east window are the arms of Eleanor, daughter of Henry, 3rd Earl of Lancaster, those of John de Beaumont, 2nd Baron Beaumont (died 1342), her husband, and of the Marmion family. In the south aisle east window are fragments of medieval stained glass, including a haloed and yellow-robed figure.

Within the church are marble monuments and plaques commemorating eighteen people, dated between 1719 and 1848, and others to charitable bequests. Included are those to Billingborough rector Robert Kelham (died 1752), to Revd Brownlow Toller (died 1794), and to Thomas Buckberry (died 1828), who in 1827 provided for a charity to distribute bread to the poorest parishioners. Church plate includes a chalice, dated 1829, and a paten, probably by William Bellchambers.
