= St Andrew's Church, Folkingham =

Coordinates: 52.8904°N 0.4093°W

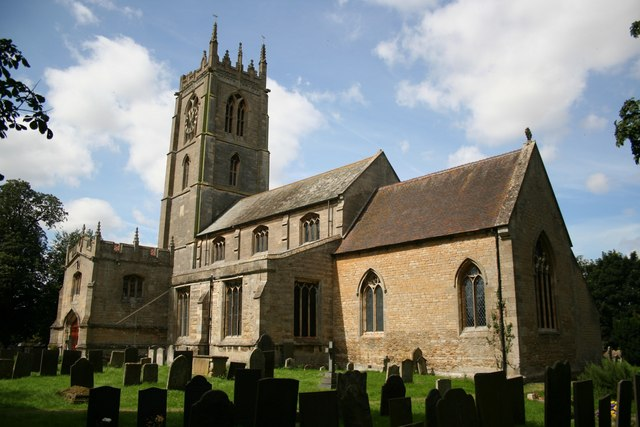
- View from the South East with missing pinnacle
- St Andrew's Church, Folkingham
- OS grid reference: TF 07126 33731
- Country: England
- Denomination: Church of England

History
- Dedication: Saint Andrew

Administration
- Province: Canterbury
- Diocese: Lincoln
- Deanery: Deanery of Lafford

Clergy
- Rector: Rev Rebecca Rock

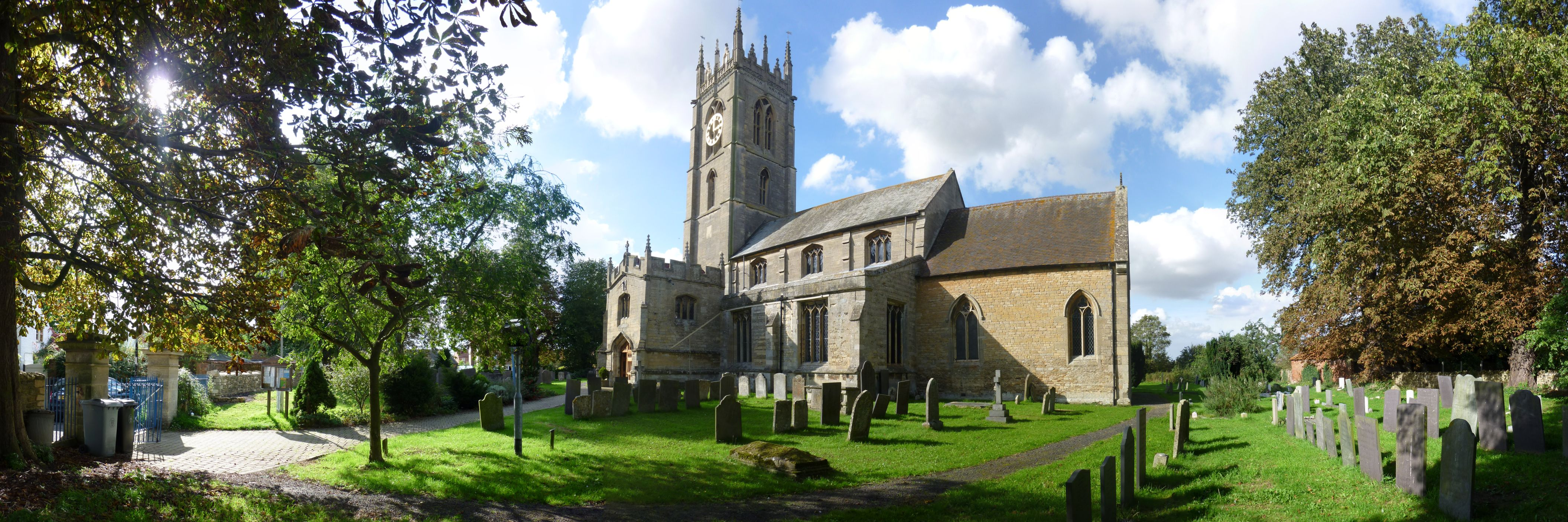
St. Andrew's Church churchyard

The Church of St Andrew in Folkingham, Lincolnshire, England, is Grade I–listed Anglican church. Originating in the late 12th century, it was largely completed by the late 15th, with restorations carried out in 1825, 1858 and 1860. It has early Decorated style arcades and a mainly Early English chancel, with a Norman pier where there was an opening into a chantry chapel. On the south side of the church are the remains of stocks and a whipping-post.

The churchyard contains the war graves of two army personnel of the First World War.

The church is a prominent feature of the village, but is inconspicuous from the Market Place. In 2006 it was damaged when gale force winds blew down two of the four pinnacles, one of which fell onto the roof causing damaging costing more than £100,000 to repair.

Folkingham is part of the Parish of South Lafford in the Deanery of Lafford, Diocese of Lincoln.
