= Deanery of Lafford =

Coordinates: 53.0444°N 0.3875°W

The Deanery of Lafford is an historic deanery in the Anglican Diocese of Lincoln in England. Located around the market town of Sleaford, it covers an area of c.200 square miles and serves a population of c.36,000.

In 1910 the Deanery was divided into the Deaneries of Lafford i or North Lafford, and the Deanery of Lafford ii or South Lafford. The two Deaneries re-merged in 1964 to form Lafford Deanery.

Parishes of the Gilbertine Benefice were added in 2010.

== Rural Deans of Lafford ==
- 1978-1987: Thomas George Williamson
- 1987-1996: John Stephen Thorold
- 1996-2002: Canon Samuel Hall Speers
- 2002-2003: Graham Parry Williams
- 2003-2007: Peter John Mander
- 2008-2012: John Andrew Patrick
- 2012-present: Christine Pennock

== Parish churches ==
The following ecclesiastical parish churches were part of Lafford Deanery as of April 2012.

Note: The parish churches marked † were not part of the deanery as it was constituted in the nineteenth century.

- Anwick, St Edith
- Asgarby, St Andrew
- Aslackby, St James
- Aswarby, St Denys
- Aunsby, St Thomas Of Canterbury
- Billingborough, St Andrew †
- Billinghay, St Michael And All Angels
- Bloxholm, St Mary
- Burton Pedwardine, St Andrew/Blessed Virgin Mary/St Nicholas
- Cranwell, St Andrew
- Dembleby, St Lucia
- Digby, St Thomas Of Canterbury
- Dorrington, St James
- Dowsby, St Andrew †
- Evedon, St Mary
- Ewerby, St Andrew
- Folkingham, St Andrew
- Great & Little Hale, St John The Baptist
- Heckington, St Andrew
- Helpringham, St Andrew
- Horbling, St Andrew †
- Kirkby Green, Holy Cross †
- Kirkby Laythorpe, St Denys
- Leasingham, St Andrew
- Martin, Holy Trinity†
- New Sleaford, St Denys
- Newton, St Botolph
- North Kyme, St Luke †
- Osbournby, St Peter & St Paul
- Pickworth, St Andrew
- Quarrington and Old Sleaford, St Botolph
- Rowston, St Clement
- Ruskington, All Saints
- Scopwick, Holy Cross
- Scot Willoughby, St Andrew
- Scredington, St Andrew
- Pointon, Christchurch
- Silk Willoughby, St Denys
- South Kyme, St Mary & All Saints
- Swarby, St Mary And All Saints
- Swaton, St Michael
- Threekingham, St Peter
- Timberland, St Andrew †
- Walcot, St Nicholas
- Walcott, St Oswald †
