= List of monastic houses in Lincolnshire =

Locations of monastic houses in Lincolnshire
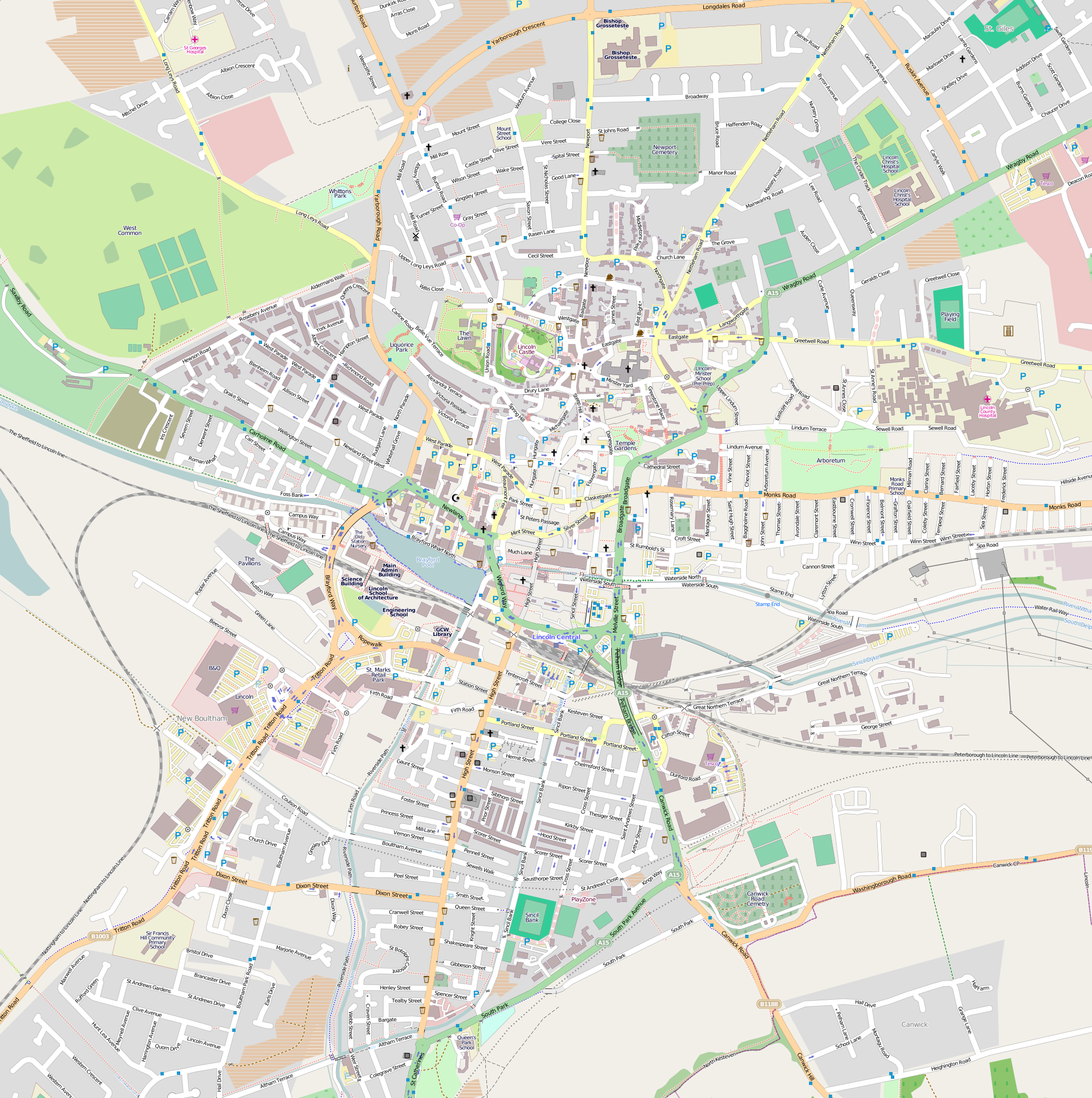
Locations of monastic houses in Lincoln
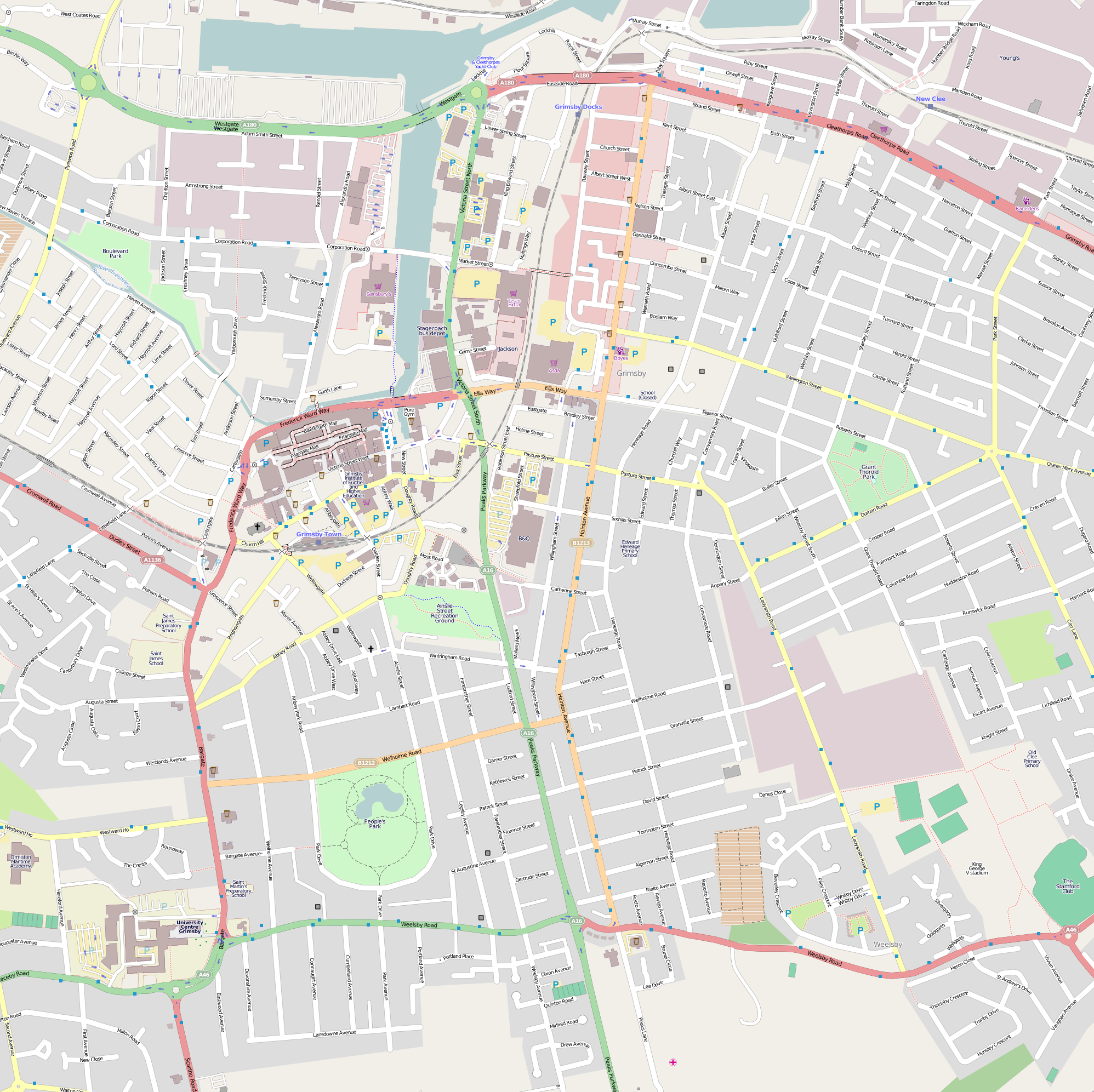
Locations of monastic houses in Grimsby
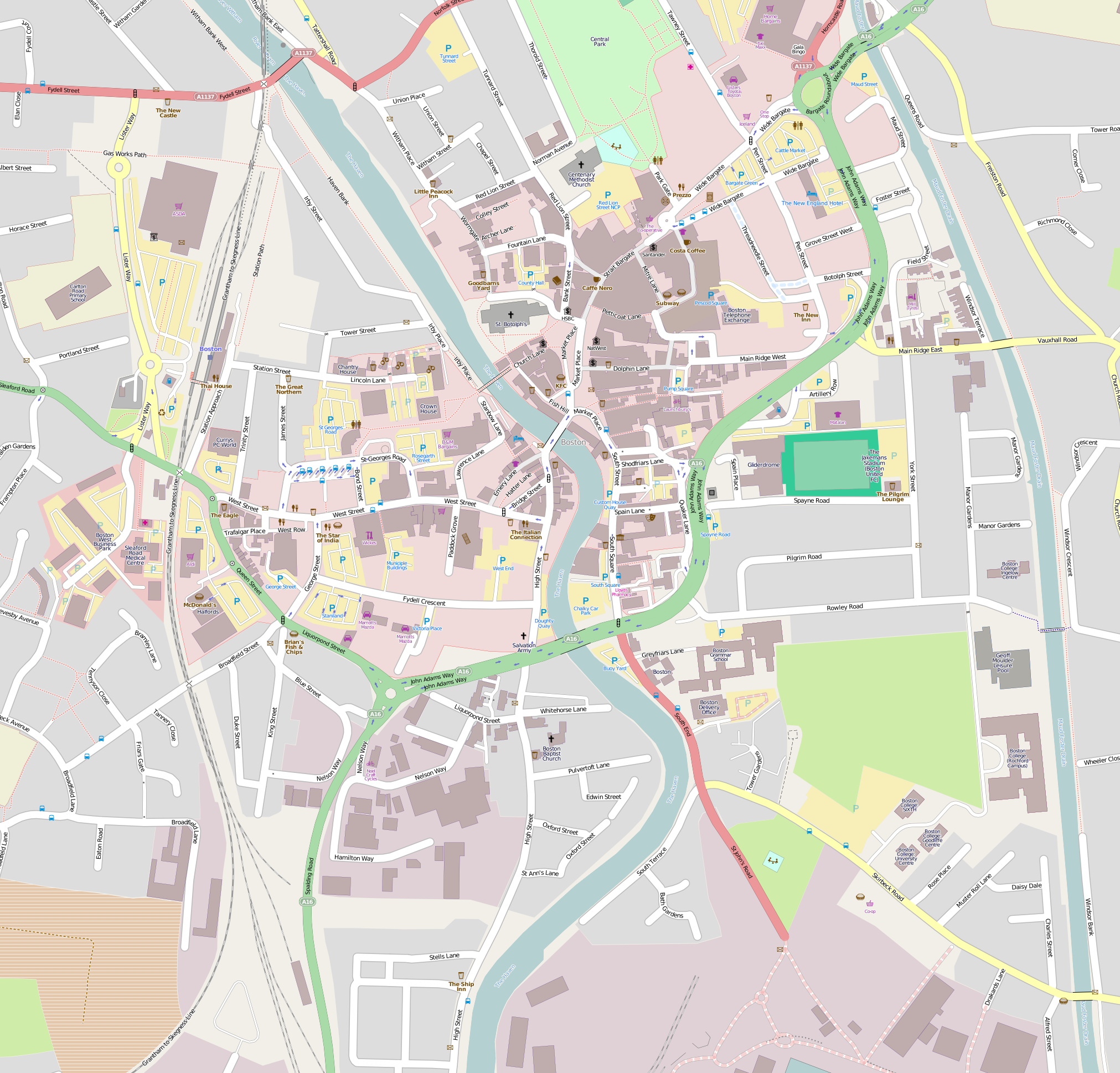
Locations of monastic houses in Boston
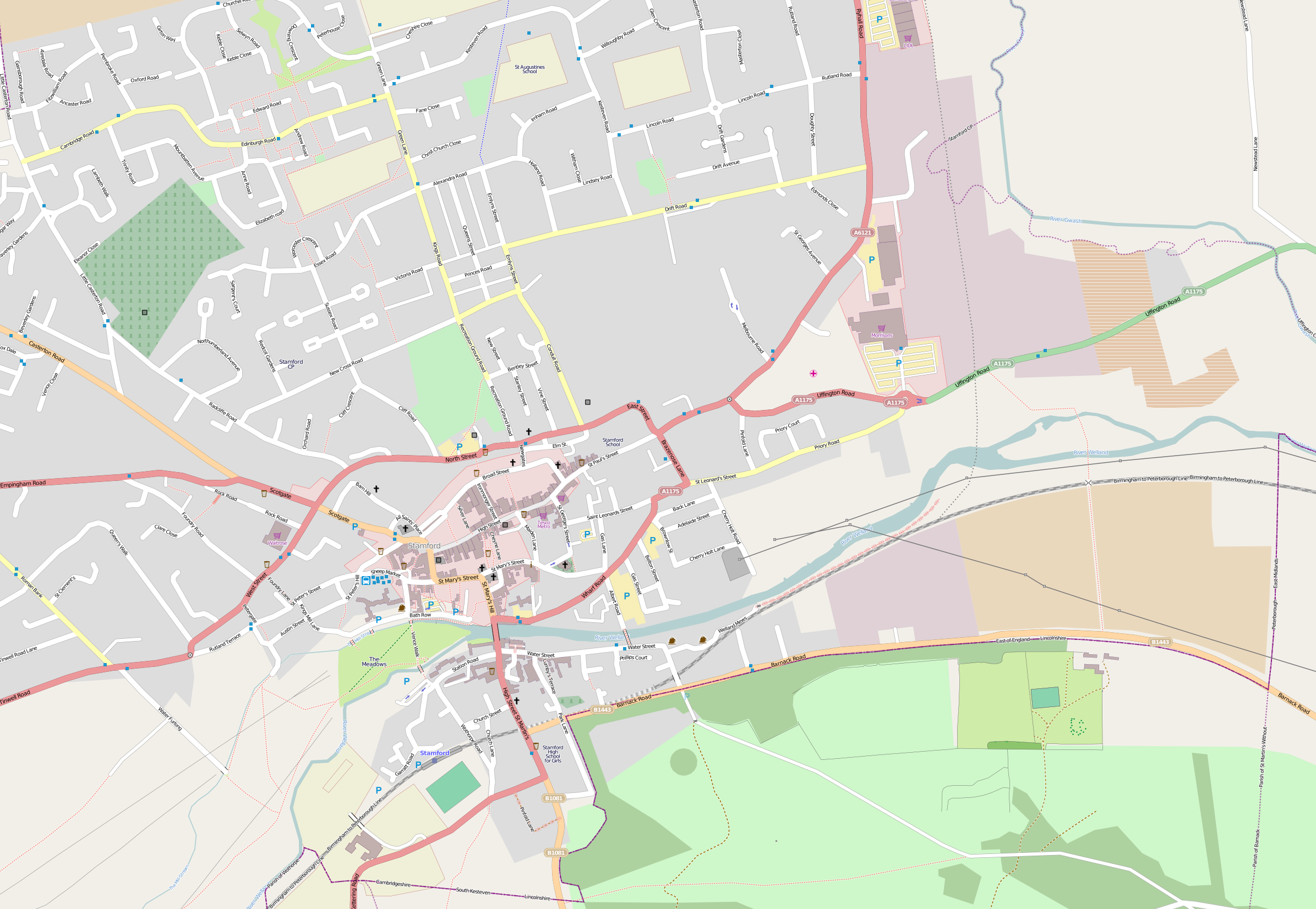
Locations of monastic houses in Stamford

The following is a list of monastic houses in Lincolnshire, England.

One unusual feature is the large number in the Witham Valley.

Alien houses are included, as are smaller establishments such as cells and notable monastic granges (particularly those with resident monks), and also camerae of the military orders of monks (Knights Templar and Knights Hospitaller). Monastic hospitals are included where they had the status or function of an abbey, priory, or preceptor/commandery.

Abbreviations and key

Status of remains
Symbol	Status
None	Ruins
*	Current monastic function
^{+}	Current non-monastic ecclesiastic function (including remains incorporated into later structure)
^	Current non-ecclesiastic function (including remains incorporated into later structure) or redundant intact structure
^{$}	Remains limited to earthworks etc.
^{#}	No identifiable trace of the monastic foundation remains
^{~}	Exact site of monastic foundation unknown
^{≈}	Identification ambiguous or confused

Locations with names in italics indicate possible duplication (misidentification with another location) or non-existent foundations (either erroneous reference or proposed foundation never implemented) or ecclesiastical establishments with a monastic name but lacking actual monastic connection.

Trusteeship
EH	English Heritage
LT	Landmark Trust
NT	National Trust

== Listing ==
Foundation	Image	Communities and provenance	Formal name or dedication and alternative names	References and location
Alkborough Priory ^{+}		Benedictine monks dependent on Spalding; founded 1052: granted to Spalding by Thorold; granted to Peterborough Cathedral (then Northamptonshire, but from 1974 in county of Cambridgeshire) by Abbot Brand between 1066 and 1069; alien house: cell 1074; dissolved 1220; partly rebuilt after the Reformation	St John the Baptist	53°41′00″N 0°40′02″W
Alvingham Priory ^^{/$}		Gilbertine Canons and Canonesses — double house founded 1148-54 (during the reign of Stephen or Henry II) possibly by William de Friston, Hugh de Scotene, or Hamelin the Dean or Robert Cheiney, Bishop of Lincoln; dissolved 29 September 1538; granted to Edward, Lord Clinton 1551/2; subsequently in parochial use; now redundant	St Mary	53°24′06″N 0°03′22″E
Aslackby Preceptory ^		Knights Templar founded c.1164 (early in the reign of Henry II (or Richard I)) by John le Mareschal: church of Aslackby and chapel granted to the Templars by Hubert de Rye 1164; Knights Hospitaller transferred 1308-12, under Temple Bruer; granted to Lord Edward Clinton 1543/4; remains incorporated into 18th century Temple Farmhouse built on site; gatehouse demolished as unsafe 1891	Aslakeby Hospital	52°51′33″N 0°23′17″W
Axholme Priory		Carthusian monks founded 1395-6: projected before 1389 by Thomas Mowbray, Earl of Nottingham, Earl Marshall of England; built from 1397 on the site of a Premonstratensian chapel; incorporated into Carthusian order 1432; founded 1397-8; dissolved 18 June 1538; granted to John Candysshe (Candish) of Westbutterwick and converted into manor house	The House of the Visitation of St Mary Virgin, Axholme ____________________; Epworth in the Isle of Axholme Priory; Axholme Charterhouse; Low Melwood Priory	53°30′28″N 0°47′08″W
Bardney monastery		Saxon monastery founded before 697 by Æthelred, King of Mercia (becoming a monk and abbot here) destroyed in raids by the Danes 870; Benedictine priory built on site (see immediately below)		53°13′13″N 0°20′01″W
Bardney Abbey		Benedictine monks alien house: dependent on Charroux; priory founded 1087, on site of Saxon monastery (see immediately above); independent: raised to abbey status 1115/6; dissolved 1538; granted to Sir Robert Tirwhit; now in ownership of Bardney Parochial Council, with public access	The Priory of Saint Peter, Saint Paul and Saint Oswald The Abbey of Saint Peter and Saint Paul	53°13′13″N 0°20′01″W
Barlings Abbey, earlier site		Premonstratensian Canons daughter house of Newsham; founded 1154-5 by Ralph de Haya; transferred to new site shortly after (see immediately below); earlier site becoming a grange of the new abbey	The Abbey Church of the Blessed Virgin Mary, Barlings	53°15′20″N 0°23′01″W (possible) or 53°15′34″N 0°23′23″W (possible)
Barlings Abbey		Premonstratensian Canons daughter house of Newsham; (community founded at earlier site (see immediately above) 1154-5); transferred here shortly after foundation; dissolved 1537; granted to Charles, Duke of Suffolk	The Abbey Church of the Blessed Virgin Mary, Barlings ____________________; Oxney Abbey	53°14′52″N 0°22′08″W
Barrow Monastery		Benedictine? monks founded between 669 and 672 by Wulfhere, King of Mercia and St Chad, Bishop of Lichfield; suggested to have been a minster or secular canons' foundation (Note: Barrow — minster: Pauline Stafford, 1985, The East Midlands in the early middle ages); destroyed in raids by the Danes c.870	Barrow-on-Humber Monastery; Ad Bavuae Monastery	53°40′52″N 0°22′37″W
Barton-upon-Humber Minster		Saxon minster monks or secular canons collegiate founded 10th century		
Belvoir Priory	Historical county location. See entry under List of monastic houses in Leicestershire			
Bonby Priory		Benedictine monks alien house: cell/grange, dependent on St Fromond; founded after 1199 dissolved before 1403; granted to Beauvale, Nottinghamshire after 1403; became parochial church prior to the dissolution; restored 1894	St Andrew	53°37′36″N 0°29′01″W
Boston Austin Friars		Augustinian Friars (under the Limit of Lincoln) founded 1317/8; dissolved 1539; granted to the Mayor and burgesses of Boston 1545/6	Austin Priors	52°58′17″N 0°01′07″W
Boston Blackfriars		Dominican Friars (under the Visitation of York) founded before 1288 (1222); church and other buildings were destroyed by fire during the chamberlain's riot 1287-8; dissolved 1538 (1539); granted to Charles, Duke of Suffolk 1540/1; Shodfriars Hall and Blackfriars Hall (both pictured) incorporate remains of the monastic house		52°58′35″N 0°01′22″W
Boston Greyfriars		Franciscan Friars Minor, Conventual (under the Custody of York) founded before 1268; dissolved 1539; granted to the Mayor and burgesses of Boston 1545/6		52°58′29″N 0°01′17″W
Boston Whitefriars, earlier site		Carmelite Friars founded 1293 by Sir ____ Orreby, Kt.; transferred to new site (see immediately below) 1307 (1308)	Skirbeck Whitefriars	52°58′32″N 0°01′23″W
Boston Whitefriars		Carmelite Friars transferred to from earlier site (see immediately above) 1307 (1308); dissolved 1539; granted to the Mayor and burgesses of Boston 1545/6		52°58′32″N 0°01′33″W
Boston Priory		Benedictine monks dependent on St Mary's, York; founded 1089 (before 1098): Alan Rufus granted church of St Botolph to St Mary's; dissolved before 1291? (c.1300); Parish Church of St Botolph built on site 1309-c.1520; Knights Hospitaller purchased advowson from St Mary's 1480, church refounded as collegiate; church restored 1845 by George Gilbert Scott, 1851-3 by George Place and by Sir Charles Nicholson in 1929		52°58′45″N 0°01′27″W
Bottesford Camera		Knights Templar dissolved 1308-12; Knights Hospitaller refounded 1308-12; leased 1338; 17th century manor house built on site		53°33′04″N 0°38′46″W
Bourne Abbey ^{+}		Augustinian Canons Regular — Arroaisian founded 1138 by Baldwin Fitz Gilbert de Clare, who invited canons to settle at Bourne and granted St Peter's Church, land and resources; dissolved 1536 (1539); granted to Richard Cotton 1538/9 the church, as since modified, in parochial use	The Abbey Church of Saint Peter and Saint Paul, Bourne ____________________; Bourn Abbey	52°45′59″N 0°22′32″W
Bridge End Priory ^{$}		Gilbertine Canons founded before 1199 (during the reign of John) by Godwin, a citizen of Lincoln; burned 1445, becoming a cell of Semprimgham after 1445; dissolved 1538; granted to Edward, Lord Clinton 1541/2; masonry used in construction of Priory Farm (50 m to the north); only cropmarks visible on site	The Priory Church of Saint Saviour at Bridgend in Horbling ____________________; Holland Bridge Priory; Hollandbridge Priory	52°54′37″N 0°18′01″W
Broadholme Priory ^{$}		Premonstratensian canonesses (initially with canons and lay brothers) founded before 1154 by Agnes de Camville, land granted by her husband, Peter of Goxhill (or possibly in the reign of Stephen by the abbot and canons of Newsham); dissolved 1536	St Mary ____________________; Brodholm Priory	53°15′04″N 0°39′36″W
Bullington Priory ^{$}		Gilbertine Canons and Canonesses — double house founded 1148-1154 by Simon de Kyme (FitzWilliam); dissolved 26 September 1538; granted to Charles, Duke of Suffolk 1538/9; earthworks and cropmarks remain	The Priory Church of Saint Mary, Bullington	53°16′32″N 0°21′04″W
Burwell Priory		Benedictine monks alien house: cell, dependent on La Grande-Sauve; founded (before) 1100-7 ("by the Lords of Kyme"): church granted by Ansgot of Burwell; dissolved 1427; granted to Charles, Duke of Suffolk 1544/5; parochial church of St Michael (pictured) possibly tied to, and adjacent to the monastic house	St Michael	53°17′47″N 0°02′02″E
Bytham Abbey		Cistercian monks daughter house of Fountains, Yorkshire; founded 23 May 1147 by William le Gros, Count of Albemarle; transferred to Vaudey after 1149(?)		52°45′02″N 0°32′14″W
Cammeringham Priory		Premonstratensian Canons alien house: daughter house of Blanchelande (Normandy); founded c.1192 by Richard de Haya and his wife Maud; sold to Cistercians of Hulton, (Staffordshire) in 1396; Cistercian monks refounded 1396; granted to Robert de Tirwhit 1545/6; 18th century manor house built on its cellary range	St Michael ____________________; Cameringham Priory	53°19′41″N 0°34′36″W
Catley Priory ^{$}		Gilbertine Canons and Canonesses — double house founded 1146/(1148)-1154 by Peter de Belingey (Billinghay); dissolved 1538; granted to Robert Carr, of Sleford 1539/40	The Gilbertine priory of St Mary, Catley ____________________; Catterley Priory	53°05′08″N 0°19′53″W
Covenham Priory		Benedictine monks alien house: cell, dependent on St-Calais; founded c.1082 by William the Conqueror at the instance of William de St Carilef (St Calais), Bishop of Durham; transferred to Kirkstead 1303	The Priory Church of Saint Mary, Covenham ____________________; Coverham St Mary's Priory	53°26′25″N 0°02′10″E
Croyland Monastery ^{#}		Saxon Benedictine? monks founded after 716/757 by Æthelbald, King of Mercia; destroyed in raids by the Danes 870; Benedictine monastery built on site (see immediately below)		52°40′23″N 0°09′55″W
Croyland Abbey ^{+}, Crowland		Benedictine monks restored and rebuilt 948 by King Edred; founded 971 built on site of earlier monastery (see immediately above); dissolved 1539; eastern side of church destroyed; part of church now in parochial use as the Parish Church and part in ruins	The Priory Church of Saint Mary the Virgin, Saint Bartholomew and Saint Guthlac, Crowland ____________________; Crowland Abbey	52°40′23″N 0°09′55″W
Deeping St James Priory ^{+}		Benedictine monks priory cell, dependent on Thorney, Cambridgeshire; founded 1139 by Baldwin Fitz Gilbert (Baldwin Fil. De Gilsberti); dissolved before 1539; granted to the Duke of Norfolk 1540/1; priory church now in parochial use as the Parish Church of St James	St James ____________________; Deeping Priory; Deping Priory	52°40′19″N 0°17′20″W
Eagle Preceptory ^{#}		Knights Templar — hospital and preceptory founded before 1154 by King Stephen; dissolved 1308-12; Knights Hospitaller refounded 1312; dissolved 1540; granted to Thomas, Earl of Rutland and Robert Tirwhit 1541/2	Egle Hospital	53°10′55″N 0°42′23″W
Elsham Priory ^{#}		hospital founded before 1160; Augustinian Canons Regular founded before 1166 by Beatrice de Amundeville; dissolved 1536; granted to Charles, Duke of Suffolk 1538/9	The Hospital of SS Mary and Edmund at Elsham ____________________; Ellesham Priory; Ellesham Priory; Allesham Priory	53°35′57″N 0°26′12″W (approx)
Fosse Priory		Cistercian nuns founded before 1184 by the inhabitants of Torksey; given as Benedictine; dissolved 11 July 1539; granted to Edward, Lord Clinton 1551/2	Torksey Nunnery	53°18′N 0°44′W (approx)
Freiston Priory ^{+}		Benedictine monks priory cell, dependent on Crowland; founded after 1114: church of St James granted to Crowland by Alan de Creun; dissolved 1539; part of church now in parochial use	St James	52°58′23″N 0°03′00″E
Gokewell Priory		Cistercian nuns founded before 1148(?) (before 1185) by William de Alta Ripa; house disclaimed by Cistercian General Chapter 1268; dissolved 1536; granted to Sir William Tirwhit 1551-2; site now occupied by the derelict buildings of Gokewell Priory Farm	Gokwelle Priory	53°34′50″N 0°34′50″W
Grantham Greyfriars		Franciscan Friars Minor, Conventual (under the Custody of Oxford) founded before 1290: Pope Nicholas IV granted indulgences to penitents; dissolved 1539; Robert Bocher and David Vincent 1541/2		52°54′44″N 0°38′49″W
Great Limber Priory, Limber Magna		Cistercian monks alien house: grange?, dependent on Aunay-sur-Odon, Normandy; founded before 1157 by Richard de Humet; dissolved 1393: sold by the abbot of Aunay to the priory of St Anne, Coventry; transferred to Knights Hospitaller (see immediately below)	Lemburgh Magna Priory	53°33′37″N 0°16′58″W
Great Limber Preceptory, Limber Magna ^{$}		probably Knights Hospitaller camera/grange refounded 1393 on site of Cistercian grange (see immediately above); dissolved; granted to John Bellew and others 1544/5; post-medieval house built on site; cropmarks remain		53°33′37″N 0°16′58″W
Greenfield Priory		Cistercian nuns founded before 1153 by Eudo de Greinesby and his son Ralph; house disclaimed by Cistercian general chapter 1268; dissolved 1536; granted to Sir Henry Stanley and Lord Strange 1567/70		53°16′45″N 0°08′49″E
Grimsby Abbey		Augustinian Canons Regular founded 1132(?) (1123-33) by Henry I; dissolved 1536; granted to Sir Thomas Henneage 1544/5; precise location unknown but evidence suggest the grounds of a country house named 'The Abbey'	The Abbey Church of Saint Augustine and Saint Olaf ____________________; Wellow Abbey	53°33′35″N 0°05′07″W (suggested)
Grimsby Nunnery		Augustinian Canonesses — under the protection of the Canons at Wellow by Grimsby founded before 1184 by an ancestor of Henry IV (probably Henry II); given as Benedictine before 1185; damaged by fire 1311, and by fire and flood 1459; dissolved 15 September 1539; granted 1542/3	St Leonard ____________________; Grimesby Nunnery	53°33′08″N 0°05′35″W
Grimsby Austin Friars		Augustinian Friars (under the Limit of Lincoln) founded 1293 (before 1304) by William Fraunk with royal licence; dissolved March 1539, surrendered to Richard Ingworth, Bishop of Dover; granted to Austin Porter and John Bellow 1542/3	Austin Friars	53°33′57″N 0°05′07″W
Grimsby Greyfriars		Franciscan Friars Minor, Conventual (under the Custody of York) probably founded before 1240; dissolved 1538; granted to John Bellew and Robert Brokesby 1546/7	Grey Friars	53°33′46″N 0°05′32″W
Hagnaby Abbey		Premonstratensian Canons daughter of Welbeck, Nottinghamshire; founded 1175-6 by Lady Agnes, widow of Herbert de Orreby, in his memory,; independent: raised to abbey status 1250; dissolved 1536; granted to John Freeman, of London 1538/9; post-medieval house built on site; masonry from monastic buildings reputedly used in construction of St Andrew's Church, Hanna-cum-Hagnaby (pictured)	The Priory Church of Saint Thomas Martyr of Canterbury The Abbey Church of Saint Thomas Martyr of Canterbury ____________________; Hagneby Abbey	53°18′07″N 0°13′33″E
Haugham Priory		Benedictine monks alien house: dependent on St-Sever founded after 1080 and before 1101 by Hugh, Earl of Chester; dissolved 1397; granted to the Carthusians at St Mary's, Coventry; Carthusian monks refounded 1397; dissolved 1539?; granted to John Bellew and John Broxholm 1545/6	Hagham Priory	53°18′33″N 0°00′19″W
Haverholme Priory		Cistercian monks — from Fountains, Yorkshire founded 1137, land granted to Fountains by Alexander, Bishop of Lincoln; transferred to the Gilbertines at Louth Park 1139; Gilbertine nuns dissolved 1538?; granted to Lord Clinton 1538/9	Haverholm Priory	53°01′47″N 0°20′50″W
Henes Cell		Benedictine monks cell (/hermitage or grange?) of York	Haines Cell	
Horkstow Camera		Knights Templar cell, dependent on Willoughton; founded before 1338		
Hough Priory ^{#}		Augustinian Canons Regular alien house: dependent on Notre-Dame-du-Voeu-Cherbourg; founded c.1164; dissolved c.1414; granted to the Carthusians at Mount Grace, Yorkshire; granted to John, Lord Russell 1541/2; site located to the south of All Saints Church	Hagh Priory; Haugh Priory	53°00′22″N 0°37′28″W
Humberston Abbey ^{#}		Tironensian monks — from Hambye founded c.1160 (during the reign of Henry II) by William Fitz Ralph (William Hermeri); Benedictine monks refounded after 1413; dissolved 1536; granted to John Cheke, Esq. 1551/2; site now occupied by medieval St Peter's Church (no evidence of this having been the abbey church)	St Mary and St Peter ____________________; Humberestone Abbey; Humbereston Abbey	53°31′40″N 0°01′25″W
Hirst Priory ^{#}		Augustinian Canons Regular priory cell, dependent on Nostell; founded before 1135 by Nigel d'Albini; dissolved 1540 (1539); granted to John, Earl of Warwick 1547/8	St Mary ____________________; Hyrest Priory	53°34′58″N 0°49′35″W
Ikanho monastery		alternative suggested location near Boston (see entry under List of monastic houses in Suffolk); Saxon Benedictine? monks founded near Boston (Note: Icanho — location: Victoria County History: A History of the County of Lincoln, Volume 2, (1906), p.96-7 and T. Tanner, Notitia Monastica, p.248 suggest location was near Boston in Lincolnshire); (alternatively founded 653-4 by St Botolph at The Anchorage on the Alde Estuary at Iken, Suffolk (Note: Icanho — foundation and location: Anglo-Saxon Chronicles, (ed. D. Whitelock &c, 1961), p. 20, with note that it was located in East Anglia; T. H. Bryant, Churches of Suffolk, (1912), Volume 1, p. 5, and F. S. Stevenson assert Iken in Suffolk)) destroyed in raids but apparently never rebuilt	St Botolph	
Kirkstead Cell		possible hermitage or anchorite cell preceding the abbey		53°08′08″N 0°13′27″W
Kirkstead Abbey, earlier site		Cistercian monks — from Fountains, Yorkshire founded 2 February 1139 by Hugh Brito, Lord of Tattershal; transferred to new site (see immediately below) between 1160 and 1175		53°08′10″N 0°13′23″W
Kirkstead Abbey		Cistercian monks — from Fountains, Yorkshire (community founded at earlier site (see immediately above) 2 February 1139); transferred here 1187; founded by Robert, son of the founder of the earlier site; dissolved 1537; granted to Charles, Duke of Suffolk 1538/9; capella ante portas in use as parochial church		53°08′19″N 0°13′25″W
Knaith Priory		Cistercian nuns (or possibly initially Benedictine nuns) founded c.1180 (Note: Knaith — foundation date given in Monasticon Anglicanum: Charter 1) (or after 1135) by Reyner Evermere; Cistercian nuns by 1347, with priest brothers acting as chaplains (possibly Premonstratensian Canons) recorded by some as Benedictine dissolved 1539; granted to Sir Thomas Henneage 1539/40	The Priory Church of Saint Mary, Knaith ____________________; Heynings Priory; Heyninges Priory	53°21′28″N 0°43′49″W
Kyme Priory ^{+}		Augustinian Canons Regular founded c.1150 (before 1156) by Philip de Kyme, Steward of Gilbert, Earl of Lincoln; dissolved 6 July 1539; granted to Thomas, Earl of Rutland, and Robert Tirwhit 1541/2; remains incorporated into St Mary and All Saints parish church	The Priory Church of the Blessed Virgin Mary, Kyme ____________________; South Kyme Priory	53°01′57″N 0°15′32″W
Legbourne Priory		Cistercian nuns transferred from Karledale, Kedington or Halington (Note: Legbourne origin according to Notitia Monastica. The references to Karledale, Kedington and Halington may be the same place) founded after 1150 by Robert fitz Gilbert of Tathwell; sometimes referred to as an abbey; with regular priests or brethren 12th century to 14th century; also given as Augustinian (Note: Legbourne — Order of St Austin: sic. Leland) and Premonstratensian (Note: Legbourne — Premonstratensian: sic. Notitia Monastica) dissolved before Michaelmas 1536; briefly restored during the Lincolnshire rebellion; dissolved; granted to Thomas Henneage 1540/1	St Mary ____________________; Lekeburn Priory	53°20′15″N 0°02′24″E
Lincoln Austin Friars		Augustinian Friars (under the Limit of Lincoln) founded c.1269-70: protection granted by Henry III 2 January 1270; dissolved 1539; granted to John Bellew and John Broxholm 1545-6		53°14′19″N 0°32′19″W
Lincoln Blackfriars		Dominican Friars (under the Visitation of York) founded before 1238; dissolved 1539; granted to John Bellew and John Broxholm 1545-6; Technical College built on site 1931		53°13′52″N 0°32′02″W
Lincoln Commandery		Knights Hospitaller founded before 1257: reference implies existence of commandery or bailiwick; evidently ceased before 1338		
Lincoln Friars of the Sack		Friars of the Sack founded before c.1266: location granted by Henry III; abandoned (?)before 1307; chapel 1307; chapel served by secular chaplains 1327; St Peter's College or Chantry 1359		53°13′43″N 0°31′58″W
Lincoln Greyfriars		Franciscan Friars Minor, Conventual (under the Custody of York) founded c.1230: locality granted by William de Bellingworth (Beningworth), subdean of Lincoln (confirmation granted 7 February 1230-1; the old Guildhall assigned 1237); dissolved 1539; granted to J. Pope 1544-5; free Grammar School founded 1568 by Robert Morson; became the Mechanics Institute 1883; restored 1905; opened as the City Museum 1907		53°13′45″N 0°32′14″W
Lincoln Whitefriars		Carmelite Friars founded before 1260 (1269) by Odo of Kilkenny; church demolished and rebuilt 15th century; dissolved 1539; granted to John Broxholm 1544/5; kitchen remained in domestic use until 17th century		53°13′29″N 0°32′36″W
Lincoln — St Katherine's Priory		Gilbertine Canons founded after 1148; dissolved 1538; granted to Charles, Duke of Suffolk 1538/9		53°12′47″N 0°32′54″W
Lincoln — St Mary Magdalen Priory		Benedictine monks cell, dependent on St Mary's, York; refounded from Rumburgh, Suffolk by Alan of Richmond c.1135(?); dissolved 1539; granted to John Bellew and John Broxholm 1545/6; remains now within a public park	St Mary's Priory; de Nicholia (presumably 'Lincolnia')	53°13′48″N 0°31′12″W
Long Bennington Priory ^{#}		Cistercian monks alien house: (?)grange, dependent on Savigny; founded1200(?) by Ralph de Filgeries; referred to as an alien priory, apparently a grange; dissolved after 1403; granted to the Carthusians at Mount Grace, Yorkshire 1421 (confirmed 1462); granted 1532/3; a house called 'Priory House' near the church is purported to be located near the site of the priory	Long Benyngton Priory; Long Bennington Grange	52°59′07″N 0°44′42″W
Louth Park Abbey		Cistercian monks dependent on Fountains, Yorkshire; (community founded at Haverholme 1137); transferred here 2 February 1139: land granted by Alexander, Bishop of Lincoln; dissolved 8 September 1536; granted to Sir Henry Stanley 1569/70	The Abbey Church of Saint Mary, Louth Park ____________________; Louth Abbey	53°22′36″N 0°02′01″E
Maltby Preceptory		(Knights Templar? founded c.1135-54) (Note: Maltby Preceptory: Templars sic. Monasticon Anglicanum — Knowles & Hadcock say that is an error and that the house was founded by the Hospitallers); Knights Hospitaller founded 1312 by Ranulf, Earl of Chester; united with Skirbeck in 1386; annexed to the estate of the prior of England 1445; dissolved 1540		53°20′26″N 0°02′13″W
Markby Priory		Augustinian Canons Regular founded c.1154-1189 (during the reign of Henry II) by Ralph fitz Gilbert; dissolved 1536; granted to Charles, Duke of Suffolk 1538/9	St Peter ____________________; Markeby Priory	53°17′07″N 0°13′47″E
Melwood Priory		Saxon monastery at Epworth	Low Melwood Priory; Melwood Priory; The Priory in the Wood	
Mere		Knights Hospitaller — member of Willoughton		
Minting Priory		Benedictine monks alien house: dependent on St-Benoit-sur-Loire; founded c.1129, granted by Ranulph de Meschines, Earl of Chester; dissolved 1414; granted to Mount Grace 1421; granted 1542/3	St Andrew	53°14′42″N 0°13′28″W
Newbo Abbey, Sedgefield		Premonstratensian Canons — from Newsham daughter house of Newsham; founded 1198 by Richard de Malebisse; dissolved 1536; granted to Sir John Markham 1537/8	Neubo Abbey	52°55′55″N 0°43′06″W
Newsham Abbey		Premonstratensian Canons daughter house of Licques; founded 1143 by Peter de Gousel; dissolved 1536; granted to Charles, Duke of Suffolk 1538/9; likely to have remained unoccupied after suppression	St Mary and St Martial ____________________; Newhouse Abbey; Neus Abbey	53°36′12″N 0°17′47″W
Newstead Priory		hospital founded before 1200 by William d'Albini III; Augustinian Canons Regular refounded before 1247 probably by the son of William d'Albini; dissolved 1536	Newstead by Stamford Priory	52°39′30″N 0°27′15″W
Newstead-on-Ancholme Priory		Gilbertine Canons founded 1171(?), granted by Henry II; dissolved 2 October 1538; granted to Robert Henneage 1539/40	The Holy Trinity ____________________; Newstede-on-Alcolm Priory; Newstead Priory; Newstead on Anchcolme Priory	53°31′38″N 0°29′34″W
Nocton Priory		Augustinian Canons Regular founded 12th century (probably during the reign of Stephen) by Robert Darcy (de Arecy); dissolved 1536; Sir Henry Stanley, Lord Strange constructed a secular house from the ruins 1569-70; house abandoned end of 17th century and the buildings demolished	St Mary Magdalene ____________________; Nocton Park Priory	53°10′09″N 0°23′23″W
North Hykeham Priory		Benedictine monks alien house: dependency unknown ("priory, manor or lordship of Ikham"); foundation unknown; dissolution unknown; granted to God's House, Cambridge	Hykeham Priory	53°10′26″N 0°36′36″W
North Ormsby Priory		Gilbertine Canons founded 1148-54 by Gilbert fitz Robert of Ormsby with the consent of William le Gros, Count of Albemarle; dissolved 30 September 1538	St Mary ____________________; Nun Ormsby Priory; Ormsby Priory; Northomersby Priory	53°25′09″N 0°04′15″W
Nun Cotham Priory ^{$}		Cistercian nuns founded 1147-53 (probably during the reign of Stephen) by Alan de Muncells (Moncels); with regular priests or brethren c.1150 to 14th century; recorded as Gilbertine c.1200; house disclaimed by Cistercian General Chapter 1268; dissolved 9 July 1539; granted to Edward Shipwith 1540/1; house built on site, of which only earthworks remain	St Mary ____________________; Nuncotham Priory; Cotham Priory; Nuncoton Priory	53°35′05″N 0°15′17″W
Orford Priory ^{$}		Premonstratensian Canonesses founded c.1155-60 by Ralph de Albini; with regular priests or brethren before 1160-14th century; dissolved 1539; granted to Robert Tirwhit 1539/40; house built on site, of which only earthworks remain	Irford Priory	53°26′01″N 0°13′02″W (probable)
Partney Monastery		Saxon monastery founded before 700; suggested to have been a minster; probably destroyed in raids by the Danes c.870		53°11′35″N 0°06′43″E
Partney Cell		Benedictine monks founded before 1318: chapel of St Mary Magdalene granted to the monks of Bardney by Gilbert of Ghent (confirmed by his son Walter 1115); hospital founded early-14th century; became cell of Bardney; dissolved before 16th century(?) (referred to as a manor of Bardney 1535)	Hospital of St Mary Magdalene	53°11′25″N 0°06′32″E
Repingas Monastery, Rippingale?		Benedictine(?) monks dependent on Peterborough, Northamptonshire (Cambridgeshire); founded c.690; destroyed in raids by the Danes 870	Hrepingas Monastery	
Revesby Abbey ^{$}		Savignac monks — from Rievaulx, Yorkshire daughter house of Rievaulx founded 9 August 1143 by William de Romara, Earl of Lincoln, his wife and son; Cistercian monks orders merged 17 September 1147; dilapidated by dissolved 23 March 1539; granted to Charles, Duke of Suffolk 1538/9; remains comprise earthworks in a field in private ownership without public access; (the current 19th century building north of the village of Revesby named 'Revesby Abbey' is located in a deerpark which was in the ownership of the monastic house)	St Mary and St Laurence	53°07′43″N 0°03′36″W
Sandtoft Priory		Benedictine monks cell, dependent on St Mary's, York; founded after 1147/before 1186 by Roger de Mobray (or Godfrey de la Wyrch); dissolved after 1291		53°33′48″N 0°53′03″W
Sempringham Priory, earlier site		Gilbertine Canons and nuns founded 1131 by Sir Gilbert, of Sempringham (St Gilbert of Sempringham); transferred to new site (see immediately below) c.1139; now in parochial use	St Andrew	52°52′55″N 0°21′31″W
Sempringham Priory ^{#}		Gilbertine Canons and Canonesses — double house (community founded at earlier site (see immediately above) c.113; transferred here 1139, land granted by Gilbert de Gant (St Gilbert of Sempringham's feudal lord); dissolved 1538; granted to Edward, Lord Clinton 1538/9; mansion later built on site no longer exists	St Mary	52°52′44″N 0°21′30″W
Sixhills Priory		Gilbertine Canons and Canonesses — double house; founded between 1148 and 1154 by Robert? de Gresley (Grelle) (or his son); dissolved 29 September 1538; granted to Thomas Henneage 1538/9; remains incorporated into later house	Sixle Priory; Sixhill Priory	53°22′11″N 0°15′11″W
Skendleby Priory		Benedictine monks cell dependent on Bardney; founded c.1318 (upon his resignation as Abbot of Bardney, Robert de Waynfleet was assigned the cells of Partney and Skendleby)		53°11′56″N 0°08′22″E
Skirbeck Commandery		hospital founded 1130 by Sir John Malton; Knights Hospitaller granted 1230 by Sir Thomas Multon; dissolved 1408(?); granted to Charles, Duke of Suffolk 1541/2	Skirbeke Hospital; St Leonard's Hospital	
Spalding Priory		Benedictine monks cell, dependent on Crowland; founded 1052 by Thorold de Buckenhale; dissolved c.1071; alien house: dependent on St-Nicholas, Angers founded 1174; became denizen: independent from 1397; dissolved 1539; granted to Sir John Cheke 1549/50		52°47′05″N 0°08′53″W
Stainfield Priory		Benedictine nuns founded c.1154 by Henry Percy; dissolved 1536; granted to Robert Tirwhit 1537/8; Stainfield Hall built on the site after dissolution	Stanfeld Priory	53°14′39″N 0°20′12″W
Stamford All Saints' College		Benedictine Monks dependent on Crowland; founded 1109		
Stamford Austin Friars		Augustinian Friars (under the Limit of Lincoln) on the earlier friary of Friars of the Sack; projected 1340 by Edward III founded 1343 (1342) by Robert of Woodhouse, Archdeacon of Richmond received permission from Clement VI for the founded (Note: Stamford Austin Friars — Knowles & Hadcock give date of papal permission 1243, but this must be a typographical error as a) that date is prior to the date Edward III projected the foundation and b) Clement VI was pope 1342-52); school of theology 1392; dissolved October 1538		52°39′00″N 0°29′10″W
Stamford Blackfriars ^{#}		Dominican Friars (under the Visitation of Cambridge) founded before 1241; dissolved 7 October 1538		52°39′09″N 0°28′18″W
Stamford Cell in Burghley Park		Benedictine Monks dependent on Peterborough, Northamptonshire (Cambridgeshire); founded c.1200		
Stamford Friars of the Sack		Friars of the Sack founded before 1274; dissolved 1300; Austin Friars Friary founded here		52°39′00″N 0°29′10″W
Stamford Hall		Gilbertine Canons founded 1292; dissolved c.1334;		
Stamford Greyfriars		Franciscan Friars Minor, Conventual (under the Custody of Oxford) founded before 1230: Henry III granted fuel January 1230; dissolved 8 October 1538		52°39′18″N 0°28′13″W
Stamford Whitefriars		Carmelite Friars founded before 1268; dissolved 8 October 1538		52°39′14″N 0°28′17″W
Stamford Monastery		Saxon monks founded 658(?); destroyed in raids by the Danes 9th century; Benedictine priory built on site (see immediately below)		52°39′10″N 0°27′57″W
Stamford — St Leonard's Priory		Benedictine monks cell, dependent on Durham; founded after 1083 by William, Abbot of Peterborough on site of a Saxon monastery (see immediately above); dissolved 1538; granted to Richard Cecil 1540/1	Stanford Priory	52°39′10″N 0°27′57″W
Stixwould Priory ^{$}		Cistercian nuns founded c.1135 (c.1131) (early in the reign of Stephen or late in the reign of Henry I) by Lucy, dowager Countess of Chester; with regular priests or brethren from 12th century to after 1308; Benedictine nuns — from Stainfield refounded house disclaimed by Cistercian General Chapter 1268; also given as Gilbertine Canons and Canonesses ?before 1308; dissolved 1536; Benedictine nuns refounded 1536; Premonstratensian Canonesses refounded 1537; dissolved 1537-9; granted to Robert Dighton 1540/1; remains comprise earthworks	Stykeswold Priory	53°10′43″N 0°14′50″W
Stow Monastery		Saxon monks — secular college founded before 1016 (c.975 in the time of Bishop Aelfnoth) or c.1005 by Eadnoth, Bishop of Dorchester, granted by Earl Leofric and Godiva 1055-7; ceased at the Conquest, 1066 (1067); Benedictine abbey built on site (see immediately below)		53°19′39″N 0°40′38″W
Stow Abbey		Benedictine monks community founded at Eynsham, Oxfordshire 1005) transferred here 1091; founded 1091, on the site of Saxon monastery (see immediately above); transferred to Eynsham c.1094/5 (1109?); conventual church in parochial use from c.1094/5	The Abbey Church of Saint Mary	53°19′39″N 0°40′38″W
St Æthelreda's nunnery, Stow Green		Anglo-Saxon royal foundation at Stow Green 7th to 9th century	St Æthelthryth	52°53′56″N 0°22′01″W
Swineshead Abbey		Savignac monks daughter house of Furness; founded 1 February 1135 by Robert de Gresley (Griesley); Cistercian monks orders merged 17 September 1147; dissolved 1536; granted to Edward, Lord Clinton 1552/3; farmhouse built on site by John Lockton, incorporating monastic remains	St Mary ____________________; Swinshed Abbey	52°56′52″N 0°08′30″W
Temple Bruer Preceptory		Knights Templar founded before 1185 by William of Ashby; dissolved 1308-12; Knights Hospitaller transferred c.1312; dissolved 1540-1; granted to Charles, Duke of Suffolk 1541/2		53°04′16″N 0°29′46″W
Thornholme Priory		Augustinian Canons Regular founded by King Stephen; dissolved 1536	The Priory Church of the Blessed Virgin Mary, Thornholme ____________________; Thornholm Priory	53°36′01″N 0°32′34″W
Thornton Abbey		Augustinian Canons Regular priory founded 1139 by William le Gros, Count of Albemarle and Lord of Holderness; raised to abbey status 1148 dissolved 12 December 1539 refounded as secular priests' college suppressed by Edward VI 1547; demolished by Sir Vincent Skinner after 1602; stately home built on site by Skinner collapsed reportedly c.1611; (EH)	The Abbey Church of the Blessed Virgin Mary, Thornton ____________________; Thornton-upn-the-Humber Abbey	53°39′18″N 0°18′35″W
Threekingham Nunnery, Tricengeham?		Saxon nuns founded c.680 by St Werburgh; (formerly identified as Trentham, Staffordshire) destroyed in raids by the Danes c.870	Threckingham Nunnery	
Throckenholt Priory		hermitage and chapel Benedictine monks cell, dependent on Thorney; founded 1154-69 (during the reign of Henry I), granted to Thorney by Nigel, Bishop of Ely; dissolved 1190	Trockenholt Priory	52°39′52″N 0°00′48″E
Thwaite Priory ^		Augustinian Canons Regular cell, dependent on Thornton; founded before 1440; dissolved before 1536(?); incorporated into 18th century cottage named 'Thwaite Hall'		53°12′20″N 0°11′31″E
Torksey Priory ^{#}		Augustinian Canons Regular founded possibly by Henry II, who granted privileges, or by King John; dissolved 1536; granted to Sir Philip Hobby 1544/5	The Priory Church of Saint Leonard, Torksey ____________________; St Leonard's Priory; Torkesey Priory	53°18′03″N 0°44′41″W
Tunstall Priory		Gilbertine Canons (and Canonesses?) — possible double house founded before 1164 (during the reign of Stephen) by Reginald de Crevequer; united to Bullington by his son William before 1189	St Mary ____________________; Redbourne Priory	(not known precisely): 53°29′16″N 0°32′22″W; 53°29′09″N 0°29′32″W (53°29′22″N 0°29′48″W (alternative suggested))
Tupholme Abbey		Premonstratensian Canons daughter house of Newsham; founded 1155-6 by Alan de Neville and Gibert, his brother; dissolved 1536	The Blessed Virgin Mary	53°11′55″N 0°17′19″W
Vaudey Abbey		Cistercian monks — from Bytham daughter house of Fountains, Yorkshire; founded 23 May 1147 by William, Earl of Albemarle (after 1149: land granted by Geoffrey de Brachecurt and Gilbert de Gant, Earl of Lincoln); dissolved 1536; granted to Charles, Duke of Suffolk 1538/9		52°46′51″N 0°27′50″W
West Ravendale Priory		Premonstratensian Canons alien house: dependent on Beauport, Brittany; founded c.1202: chapel etc. granted by Alan fitz Henry, Count of Brittany; dissolved 1389 (before 1413); lands granted to Joan, consort of Henry IV 1413; granted to Southwell Collegiate Church 1452		53°28′46″N 0°09′11″W
Whaplode Friary		Crutched Friars founded 1244-7(?); incited after 1238?; abandoned 1260		52°45′09″N 0°02′44″W
Willoughton Priory		Benedictine monks alien house: (?)grange, dependent on St Nicholas, Angers; founded before 1148: land granted to St Nicholas, Angers by Empress Matilda; dissolved 1403; granted to King's College, Cambridge	Willowton Priory	53°25′37″N 0°35′52″W
Willoughton Preceptory		Knights Templar founded after 1135 (during the reign of Stephen) by Roger de Builli (Buslei); dissolved 1308-12; Knights Hospitaller transferred after 1312; dissolved 1540; granted to John Cock and John Thurgood 1345/6	Willowton Preceptory; Wilketone Preceptory	53°25′40″N 0°36′19″W
Wilsford Priory ^{#}		Benedictine monks alien house: cell, dependent on Bec-Hellouin and the priory of Envermeu; founded between 1135 and 1154 (during the reign of Stephen) by Hugh de Evermue (Evremewe) granted to Bourne c.1401; Augustinian Canons Regular — Arroasian refounded c.1401; dissolved 1536; granted to Charles, Duke of Suffolk 1538/9	Willesford Priory	52°57′58″N 0°30′45″W
Winghale Priory		Benedictine monks alien house: (?)grange, dependent on Séez; founded before 1115; dissolved 1400; granted to a secular clerk; granted to Trinity College, Cambridge	Wenghale Priory	53°27′26″N 0°27′04″W
Witham Preceptory		Knights Templar founded before 1164 by Margaret de Perci, Ubert de Ria and others; dissolved 1308-12; Knights Hospitaller transferred 1312; merged with Temple Bruer	South Witham Preceptory	52°46′27″N 0°37′30″W

== See also ==
- List of monastic houses in England
