= List of monastic houses in Nottinghamshire =

Locations of monastic houses in Nottinghamshire

The following is a list of the monastic houses in Nottinghamshire, England.

Alien houses are included, as are smaller establishments such as cells and notable monastic granges (particularly those with resident monks), and also camerae of the military orders of monks (Knights Templar and Knights Hospitaller). Monastic hospitals are included where they had the status or function of an abbey, priory, or preceptor/commandery.

Abbreviations and key

Status of remains
Symbol	Status
None	Ruins
*	Current monastic function
^{+}	Current non-monastic ecclesiastic function (including remains incorporated into later structure)
^	Current non-ecclesiastic function (including remains incorporated into later structure) or redundant intact structure
^{$}	Remains limited to earthworks etc.
^{#}	No identifiable trace of the monastic foundation remains
^{~}	Exact site of monastic foundation unknown
^{≈}	Identification ambiguous or confused

Locations with names in italics indicate possible duplication (misidentification with another location) or non-existent foundations (either erroneous reference or proposed foundation never implemented) or ecclesiastical establishments with a monastic name but lacking actual monastic connection.

Trusteeship
EH	English Heritage
LT	Landmark Trust
NT	National Trust

Foundation	Image	Communities & provenance	Formal name or dedication & alternative names	References & location
Beauvale Charterhouse		Carthusian monks founded 1343 by Nicholas de Cauntlow (Cantilupo), Lord of Ilkeston: licence granted 1343; dissolved 18 July 1539; granted to Richard Morison 1550/1	The Priory Church of the Holy Trinity, Beauvale The Priory Church of the Holy Trinity and Saint Mary the Virgin with All Saints ____________________; Beauvale Priory	53°02′11″N 1°16′02″W
Blyth Priory ^{+}		Benedictine monks alien house: dependent on St Holy Trinity, Rouen; founded 1088 by Roger de Builly; became denizen: independent from c.1409; dissolved 1536; granted to Richard Andrews and William Ramesden 1543/4; church now in parochial use	The Priory Church of Saint Mary the Virgin, Blyth	53°22′44″N 1°03′48″W
Broadholme Priory^{$}	Historical county location. See entry under List of monastic houses in Lincolnshire			
Felley Priory		Augustinian Canons Regular dependent on Worksop; founded 1152: church and hermitage granted to Worksop by Ralph Britto of Annesley; independent from 1260; dissolved 1536	St Mary	53°03′23″N 1°16′50″W
Fiskerton Cell		Augustinian Canons Regular possible cell dependent on Thurgarton (more likely a chapel served by Canons from Thurgarton); founded c.1139 by Ralph de Ayncourt; granted to Edward Fynes, Lord Clinton and Thomas Morrison	Fiskarton Cell	53°03′05″N 0°54′45″W
Lenton Priory		Cluniac monks alien house: dependent on Cluny; founded 1102-8 by William Peverell; became denizen: independent from 1392; dissolved 1538; granted to John Harrington 1562/3	The Priory Church of the Holy Trinity ____________________; St Anthony's Hospital	52°56′35″N 1°10′42″W
Marske Cell (?)		Benedictine monks cell? dependent on York; existence disputed	Marshe Cell	
Mattersey Priory		Gilbertine Canons founded c.1185 by Roger FitzRalph, son of Ranulf de Mattersey; destroyed by fire 1279; dissolved 3 October 1538; granted to Antony Neville, Esq. 1539/40; (EH)	The Priory Church of Saint Helen, Mattersey	53°23′53″N 0°56′37″W
Newark Greyfriars ^{#}		Observant Franciscan Friars founded 1507 (or c.1499 by Henry VII); dissolved 1534; Augustinian Friars refounded; dissolved 1539; granted to John Andrews; house built on site named 'The Friary'	Newark Greyfriars; Newark Austin Friars	53°04′40″N 0°48′15″W
Newstead Priory		Augustinian Canons Regular founded c.1163 by Henry II; dissolved 21 July 1539; granted to Sir John Byron 1541/2; converted into a mansion named 'Newstead Abbey'; restored by George Gordon Byron, poet, c.1800; restored by John Shaw for Col. Wildman 1819; further altered c.1862 for William Frederick Webb, African explorer, upon whose death, 1899, estate passed via his surviving children to his grandson Charles Ian Fraser who sold Newstead to philanthropist Sir Julien Cahn, who presented it to Nottingham Corporation 1931; now in ownership of Nottingham City Council	St Mary	53°04′42″N 1°11′33″W
Nottingham Basford Cell		Cluniac monks cell dependent on Lenton?; founded before c.1200; dissolved after 1300		
Nottingham Friary *		Franciscan Friars Minor extant	Friary and Parish of Our Lady and St Edward	52°57′47″N 1°07′41″W
Nottingham Greyfriars		Franciscan Friars Minor, Conventual (under the Custody of Oxford) founded before 1230; dissolved 1539		52°56′59″N 1°09′00″W
Nottingham — Holy Sepulchre Priory		Augustinian Canons Regular — Holy Sepulchre founded c.1170; dissolved after 1188		
Nottingham Roche Cell		Cluniac monks cell dependent on Lenton; foundation unknown; dissolved after 1405		
Nottingham Whitefriars		Carmelite Friars founded before 1271, site granted by Reginald de Grey; dissolved 5 February 1539; granted to Thomas Henneage 1548/9		52°57′09″N 1°09′07″W
Ossington Preceptory		Knights Hospitaller founded before 1154, granted by William, Archbishop of York; merged with Newland, Yorkshire 1382; church of the Holy Rood built 1782, probably stands on or near site		53°10′41″N 0°51′57″W (probable)
Rufford Abbey		Cistercian monks founded 13 July 1136 by Gilbert de Gant, Earl of Lincoln; dissolved 1536; granted to George, Earl of Shrewsbury; now in ownership of Nottinghamshire County Council		53°10′35″N 1°02′08″W
Shelford Priory		Augustinian Canons Regular founded (in the reign of Henry II) by Ralph Hanselyn; dissolved 1536; granted to Michael Stanhope 1539/40; remains incorporated into house named 'Shelford House' built c.1600, destroyed by fire 1645, rebuilt c.1678		52°59′02″N 1°00′00″W
Thurgarton Priory ^{+}		Augustinian Canons Regular founded c.1119-39 by Ralph Deincourt, with the influence of Archbishop Thurstan; dissolved 12 June 1538; fortified for Charles I 1643; in use as Bishop's Palace 1884–1904; part of church now in parochial use	The Priory Church of Saint Peter, Thurgarton	53°02′07″N 0°58′12″W
Wallingwells Priory ^		Benedictine nuns founded 1130 (probably c.1140-4) by Ralph de Chevrolcourt (Cheurolcourt); also given as Augustinian dissolved 14 December 1539; granted to Richard Pype and Francis Boyer 1563/4; granted to Richard Whalley 1548/9; remains possibly partly incorporated into country house named Wallingwells Hall, built 18th/19th century	St Mary de Parco	53°21′03″N 1°08′29″W
Welbeck Abbey		Premonstratensian Canons — from Newsham, Lincolnshire founded 1153 by Thomas of Cuckney (Thomas Jocei); canons in residence by October 1134; dissolved 20 June 1538; remains incorporated into private residence, under the ownership of Sir Charles Cavendish before 1607; since altered and remodelled	The Abbey Church of Saint James, Welbeck	53°15′44″N 1°09′22″W
Winkburn Preceptory		Knights Hospitaller founded 1189–99, church granted by Henry Hosat and vill by Adam Tysun; serving as a camera of Ossington; dissolved 1382		
Worksop Priory ^{+}		Augustinian Canons Regular — probably from Huntingdon Priory founded after 1119 by William de Lovetot; dissolved 15 November 1538; granted to Francis, Earl of Shrewsbury 1541/2 church now in parochial use	The Priory Church of Saint Mary and Saint Cuthbert, Worksop ____________________; Wirksop Priory; formerly known as Radford Priory	53°18′13″N 1°06′55″W

== See also ==
- List of monastic houses in England
