= Broadholme =

Village and civil parish in the West Lindsey district of Lincolnshire, England

Coordinates: 53.257747°N 0.663496°W

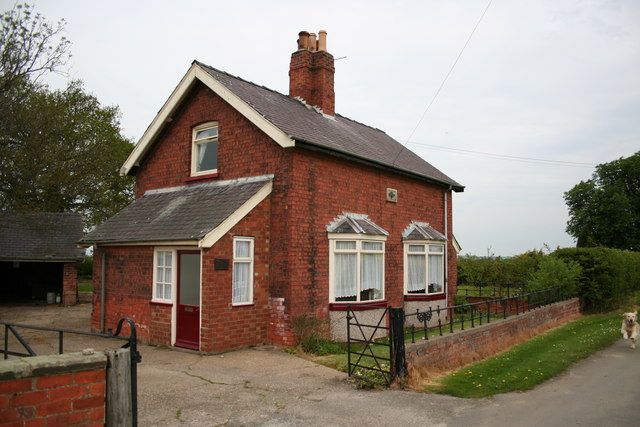
- The Lodge cottage at Broadholme

- Location within Lincolnshire
- OS grid reference: SK892742
  - London: 120 mi (190 km) S
- District: West Lindsey
- Shire county: Lincolnshire
- Region: East Midlands
- Country: England
- Sovereign state: United Kingdom
- Post town: Lincoln
- Postcode district: LN1
- Police: Lincolnshire
- Fire: Lincolnshire
- Ambulance: East Midlands
- UK Parliament: Gainsborough

Broadholme is a village and civil parish in the West Lindsey district of Lincolnshire, England. It is situated 5 miles (8 km) west from the city and county town of Lincoln, and less than 1 mile (1.6 km) south from the A57 road and the village of Saxilby. According to the 2001 census it had a population of 88. At the 2011 census, the population remained less than 100 and is now included in the civil parish of Scampton.

Historically, Broadholme was part of Nottinghamshire, formally transferring to Lincolnshire in 1989.

== History ==
The Premonstratensian Broadholme Priory was founded adjacent to the village at sometime after 1154. The priory was one of only two female priories of that order in England (the other being Orford Priory). The priory was dissolved in 1536 as part of King Henry VIII's dissolution of the monasteries. The site is currently occupied by Manor Farm, which may incorporate part of the former monastic buildings, although none are visible.

The Imperial Gazetteer of England and Wales (1870–72) recorded parish as containing 550 acres (2.2 km^{2}), and the village as having a population of 115, spread across 22 houses.

=== Transfer from Nottinghamshire to Lincolnshire ===
The village and parish of Broadholme was historically part of Nottinghamshire, and lay within the Newark and Sherwood district. In 1986 the Local Government Boundary Commission suggested that the parish of Broadholme, and a small part of the neighbouring parish of Harby, be transferred from Nottinghamshire to Lincolnshire. The primary reasoning behind the suggestion was that the village could not be accessed by road from Nottinghamshire without passing through Lincolnshire, and thus they felt it might be easier to provide council services from Lincolnshire. Broadholme is also closer to the village of Saxilby in Lincolnshire than it was to the nearest Nottinghamshire village, which is Harby. The commission suggested that the villagers might feel a closer affinity to Saxilby.

Most of those consulted about the transfer were opposed to it. Nottinghamshire County Council was opposed to the transfer, whilst villagers voted 26 to 11 to stay within Nottinghamshire. Two local campaigns were formed to oppose the transfer: the "Keep Broadholme in Nottinghamshire" campaign, and the "Broadholme Residents Campaign to stay in Nottinghamshire". Out of the 22 responses to the official consultation, only four supported the transfer: Lincolnshire County Council and three residents. Aside from the traditional connection to Nottinghamshire, those opposed to the transfer wished to retain the "superior refuse service", higher standard schools and the mobile library service they had access to as part of Nottinghamshire. Senior citizens also received a higher rate of travel vouchers as part of Nottinghamshire. Concerns were also raised as the transfer involved a change of water provider, from Severn Trent Water to Anglian Water.

Despite the overwhelming opposition both from residents and the council, the Commission went ahead with the transfer. Access to Nottinghamshire schools was only retained for those already enrolled in them, but was no longer available to new starters within the parish. The parish also lost its other benefits formerly provided by Nottinghamshire County Council or Newark and Sherwood District Council. Broadholme was formally transferred to Lincolnshire in 1989.

== See also ==
- Broadholme Priory
