= St Leonard's Priory =

St. Leonard's Priory may refer to:

- St Leonard's Priory, Grimsby
- St Leonard's Priory, London
- St Leonard's Priory, Norwich
- St Leonard's Priory, Stamford
- St. Leonard's Hospital chapel, in the grounds of York Museum Gardens
