= Horbling =

Village and civil parish in Lincolnshire, England

Coordinates: 52.903428°N 0.338050°W

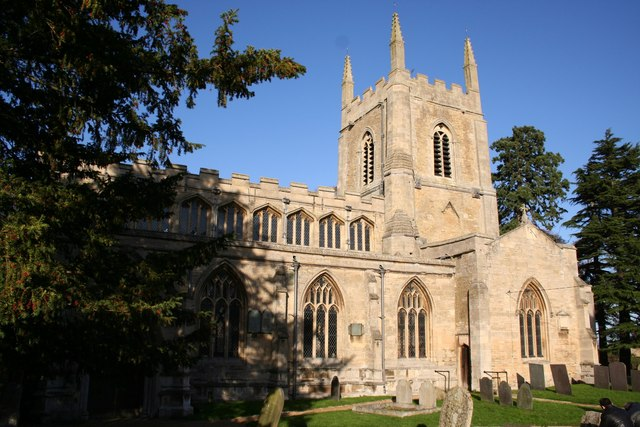
- St Andrew's Church, Horbling

- Location within Lincolnshire
- Population: 397 (2001)
- OS grid reference: TF118352
  - London: 95 mi (153 km) S
- District: South Kesteven
- Shire county: Lincolnshire
- Region: East Midlands
- Country: England
- Sovereign state: United Kingdom
- Post town: Sleaford
- Postcode district: NG34
- Dialling code: 01529
- Police: Lincolnshire
- Fire: Lincolnshire
- Ambulance: East Midlands
- UK Parliament: Grantham and Bourne

Horbling is a village and civil parish in the South Kesteven district of Lincolnshire, England. It lies on the B1177, 7 miles (11 km) south-east of Sleaford, 15 miles (24 km) north-east of Grantham and 1 mile (1.6 km) north of Billingborough.

The village population recorded in the 2001 census was 397 in 162 households.

== History ==
Horbling is the site of a probable Romano-British settlement, centred around the present Fen Drove and Fen Farm, on Horbling Fen to the east, where has been found earthwork evidence of rectilinear enclosures, and watercourses. Large quantities of Roman Samian ware and roof tiles have also been discovered. Cox noted that on the right hand side of road from Billingborough to Horbling is a tumulus, probably of pre-historic origin.

In the Domesday Book of 1086 the village is written as "Horbelinge". It consisted of 9 villagers, 8 freemen and one smallholder, land for 4 plough teams, a 20 acres (0.081 km^{2}) meadow and a church. Before the Norman Conquest Thorkill the Dane was lord of the manor, in 1086 lordship was transferred to Walter D'Aincourt.

A hamlet of Horbling, Bridge End, (previously also Holland Brigg) 1.5 miles (2.4 km) to the east, is the site of the small Gilbertine priory of St Saviour, founded in 1199 by Godwin the Rich of Lincoln. The canons at Bridgend Priory were charged with the upkeep of Holland Bridge causeway (de ponte Aslaci), a Roman road running from the Midlands to The Wash. Cox also noted: "It had a slender endowment and was probably never occupied by more than 2 or 3 canons". A parcel of land and messuage at the head of the causeway near the priory was given by Robert Jokem of Horbling to St Saviour's, to support the work of the canons. The causeway stretched between Horbling and Donington and was, until the 18th century, the only sound road between Kesteven and Holland. In 1816, Marrat recorded that Bridge End "consists of a few farm houses, and a tolerably good Inn." The priory had been taken down 45 years previously (c.1770), and its materials used for a large farmhouse virtually on the same site. Two miles to the east of the Bridge End was built a chapel where prayers were said for the safety of travellers.

The Medieval Stow Fair was held 1.5 miles (2.4 km) to the west of the village (today at the junction of Mareham Lane and Stow Lane in Threekingham), from 1233, and lasted until 1954. According to a district council notice board at the site, the fair, traditionally held on 23 June, was probably dedicated to St Ætheldreda.

Horbling was never affluent and in the reign of Elizabeth I, so low was the land rated and such was the poverty, that at the time of the collection of the first ever subsidy, Horbling had a nil return.

In 1885 Kelly's Directory noted that the village was on the Bourne and Sleaford branch of the Great Northern Railway, and that the principal dwellings were supplied by the Billingborough and Horbling Gas Company. Agricultural production in a parish of 2,620 acres (10.6 km^{2}) was chiefly wheat, barley, beans and oats. Its population in 1881 was 501. The Lord of the manor was a George Shaw, and chief landowners were Edward Nathaniel Conant, George Shaw and Captain Henry Smith JP. A school for boys and girls was originally established by Edward Brown of Horbling (d.1692) with endowments provided by income from his lands at Wigtoft. A new National School schoolhouse was erected in 1865 for the free education of 11 boys and 9 girls.

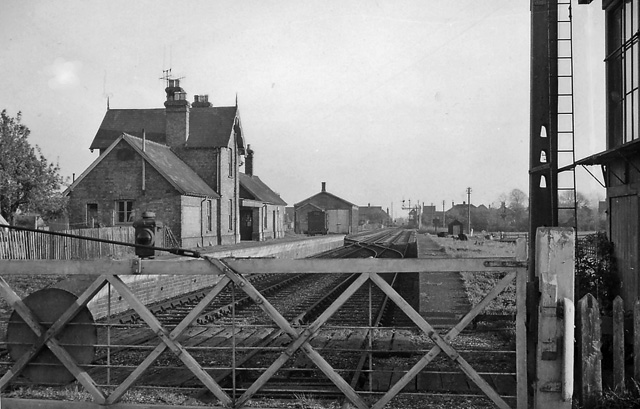
Billingborough and Horbling Station

Up to 1905 existed Horbling Windmill.

Between 1939 and 1948 an area on the south side of Sandygate Lane was used to accommodate a prisoner of war camp. As Camp 80, it held German prisoners who were used as local labourers. Housing now occupies the camp site. The camp housed many Ukrainians, one of whom presented a colourful painting of Virgin and Child to the church.

Billingboro and Horbling railway station closed in 1964, after ceasing to be a passenger carrier over 30 years previously. It was built in 1872 through an act of Parliament of 1865. After closure the line to the north of the station was used to store the Royal Train. The remains of the line just to the west of the village has become a nature reserve for small wildlife under the Lincolnshire Wildlife Trust.

== Landmarks ==
Horbling parish church is Grade I listed and dedicated to St Andrew.

The church is of cruciform construction in Norman, Early English and later styles. It comprises a chancel, clerestoried nave, aisles, transepts and embattled tower with pinnacles and 5 bells. The chancel contains a piscina and sedilia, and Norman arcading in the west front. The tower, owing to bad foundations was successively rebuilt or repaired in transitional, Early English and early Decorated periods. The north aisle and transept are late Decorative, as is the font. The south aisle and transept, and clerestory, are Perpendicular. Stained glass in the west window was added in 1854 as testimonial to Benjamin Smith (1776–1857), local solicitor and promoter of charities, who paid for the 1852 restoration of church. The south transept holds memorials to the Brown family. In the north transept is a mid-14th-century monument with effigies of knight and lady, with the arms of De La Maine. Above these effigies is a lunette containing a relief of Christ's resurrection, flanked by two figures. Pevsner also notes two 1706 patens by John Cory, a 1713 flagon by Humphrey Payne, an 1840 alms dish attributable to John Crouch, and a brass plate designed by Pugin, who also perhaps designed the brass to Benjamin Wilkinson (d.1848). Marrat, in 1816, recorded: "The inside [of] the church is not in good repair, here are some very indiferent stalls, and scarcely any pews".

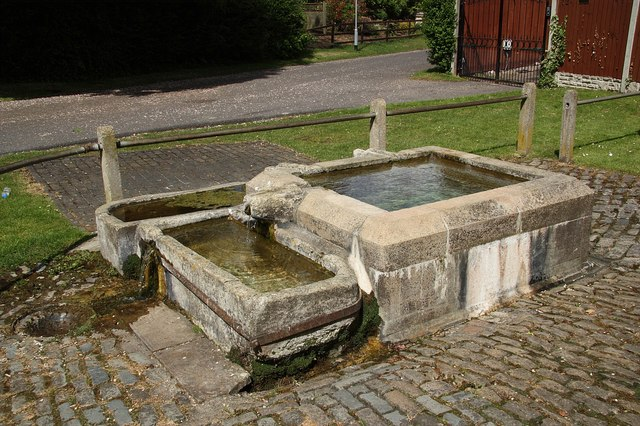
Spring well, Horbling

A spring well rises 150 yards (137.2 m) north from the church on Spring Lane: "a deep open cistern feeds water to three adjacent troughs". The well, paid for by the Constables of Horbling, dates from 1711. It has an added 1981 inscription commemorating the marriage of the Prince of Wales to Lady Diana Spencer, and is Grade II* listed.

Horbling Hall is an 1860 Grade II listed house on Horbling High Street. Pevsner, describing the village as mostly Georgian, mentions that the Hall was tudorized in 1880.

The Plough Inn is the Horbling village public house, a Grade II listed early 19th-century building on Springwell Lane, with its listed stables.

The Old Vicarage is a Grade II c.1870 red-brick house on Church Lane, with its listed carriagehouse and tack room.

Further notable buildings include farmhouses, cottages, houses and minor structures.

== Notable people ==
- Simon Bradstreet, the colonial magistrate, businessman, diplomat, and the last governor of the Massachusetts Bay Colony, was born in the village in 1603.
- Matthew Flinders, the navigator and cartographer who led the first inshore circumnavigation of mainland Australia and is also credited as being the first person to utilise the name Australia to describe the entirety of that continent, was educated in the village.
