= Trevor Branston =

English cricketer

Personal information
- Full name: George Trevor Branston
- Born: 3 September 1884; Newark-on-Trent, Nottinghamshire, England
- Died: 12 August 1969 (aged 84); Regent's Park, London, England
- Batting: Right-handed
- Bowling: Right-arm medium-pace

Domestic team information
- Years: Team
- 1903 to 1913: Nottinghamshire
- 1904 to 1906: Oxford University

Career statistics
Competition	First-class
Matches	89
Runs scored	3301
Batting average	25.78
100s/50s	3/15
Top score	194 not out
Balls bowled
Wickets	153
Bowling average	28.12
5 wickets in innings	6
10 wickets in match	0
Best bowling	6/66
Catches/stumpings	96/0
- Source: Cricinfo, 2 January 2019

George Trevor Branston (3 September 1884 – 12 August 1969) was an English amateur cricketer who played first-class cricket for Nottinghamshire and Oxford University from 1903 to 1913.

== Early life and education ==
Branston was born at Newark-on-Trent, the second son of George Henry Branston, of The Friary, Newark, Nottinghamshire, a wealthy maltster, and his wife Gwynedd, daughter of Adam Eyton, JP, of Plas Llanerch-y-Mor, Flintshire. On George Henry Branston's purchase of Branston, Lincolnshire, in 1897, the family attained the status of landed gentry; by 1952, Trevor Branston was the head of this family.

Branston attended Charterhouse School in Surrey before going up to Hertford College, Oxford. An all rounder, he won cricket Blues in 1904, 1905 and 1906, and played for Nottinghamshire during the summer holidays as an amateur.

== Cricket career ==
Branston was one of the leading players on the all-amateur MCC tour of New Zealand in 1906–07: he scored 119, one of only two centuries by the team, against Canterbury, and in all matches took 36 first-class wickets at an average of 18.69. He played in both of the representative matches against New Zealand, top-scoring in the first innings of the second match with 28. He also toured with MCC to North America in 1907 and Egypt in 1909.

Playing for the Gentlemen of England against Cambridge University in 1908, he took three wickets in each innings and scored 58 and 194 not out, his highest first-class score, to take Gentlemen of England to 401 for 6 and a four-wicket victory. His best first-class bowling figures were 6 for 66, which helped Oxford to a 50-run victory over Kent in 1905.

== Personal life ==
In 1912, Branston married Ethel May, daughter of J. E. Anderton, MBE, MD, of New Mills, Derbyshire. They had one child, a daughter, Audrey (born 1913), who married Major Ernest Nugent Oldrey, OBE, of the Royal Artillery, and had a son, Timothy Nugent Oldrey. The Branston family of Branston was extinct at Trevor Branston's death as both he and his only brother, Henry Eyton Branston (1878–1934), of The Old Hall, Balderton, Newark-on-Trent, had died without male issue.

The family lived both at Branston and at 31, St James Close, Regent's Park, NW8.
