= Minting =

Village and civil parish in the East Lindsey district of Lincolnshire, England

Coordinates: 53.245040°N 0.220070°W

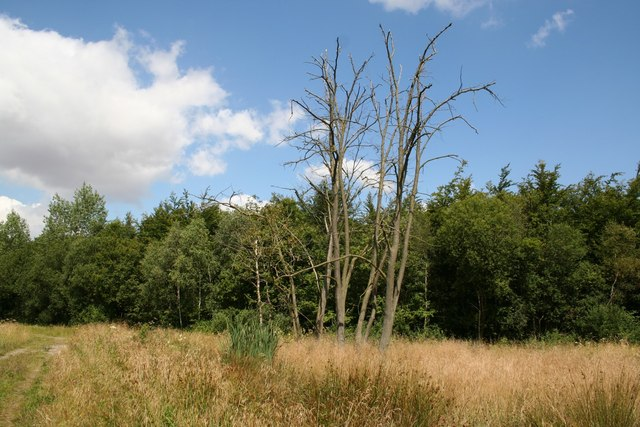
- Minting Wood

- Location within Lincolnshire
- Population: 286 (2011)
- OS grid reference: TF188734
  - London: 120 mi (190 km) S
- Civil parish: Minting
- District: East Lindsey
- Shire county: Lincolnshire
- Region: East Midlands
- Country: England
- Sovereign state: United Kingdom
- Post town: HORNCASTLE
- Postcode district: LN9
- Dialling code: 01507
- Police: Lincolnshire
- Fire: Lincolnshire
- Ambulance: East Midlands
- UK Parliament: Louth and Horncastle

Minting is a village and civil parish in the East Lindsey district of Lincolnshire, England. The village is situated 1 mile (1.6 km) south from the A158 road. The population (including Gautby) at the 2011 census was 286.

Minting Priory was located here. St Andrew's Church is a Grade II* listed building.

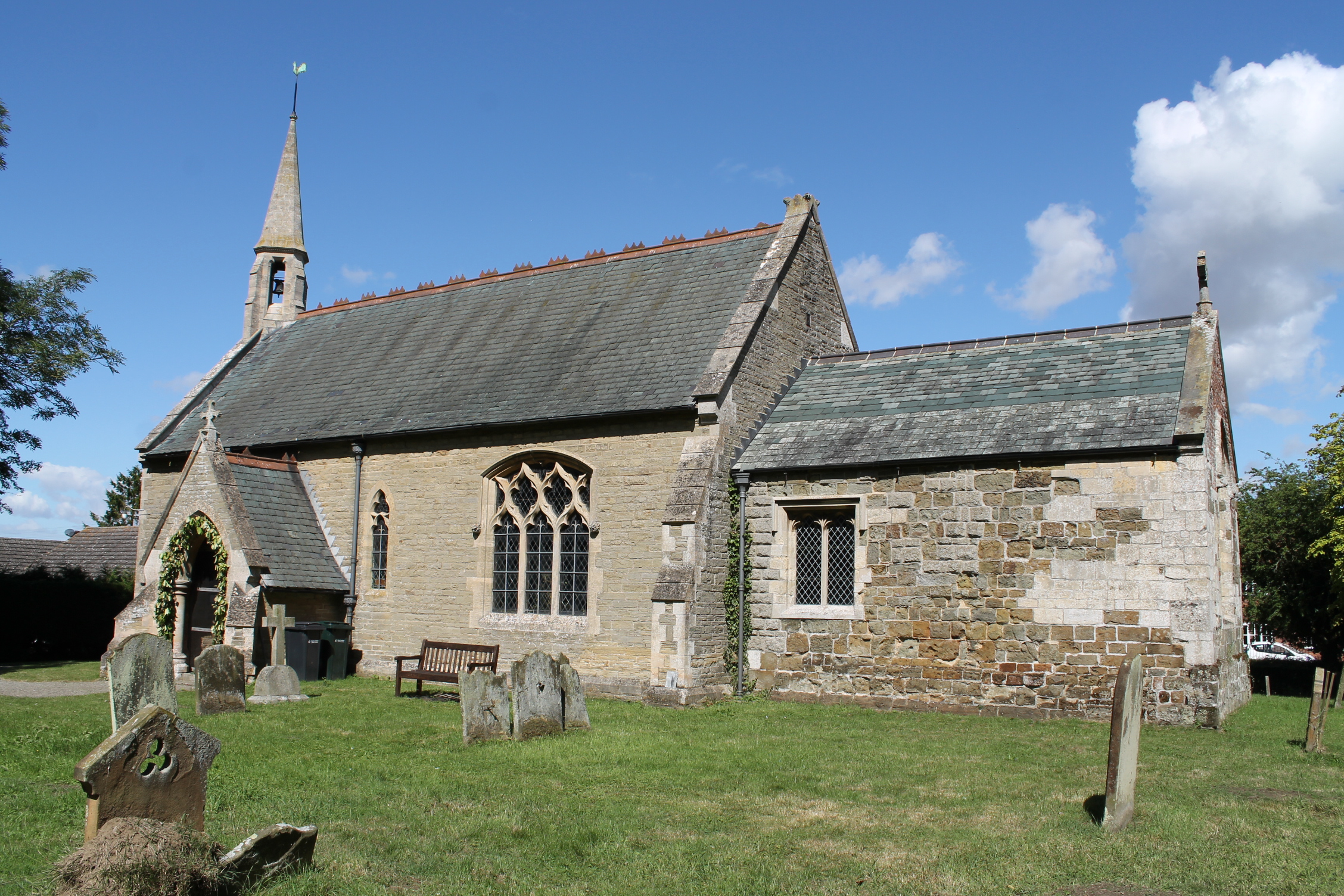
St Andrew's Church, Minting

Minting is one of the Thankful Villages that suffered no fatalities during the Great War of 1914 to 1918. The village is featured on Darren Hayman's album, Thankful Villages Volume 3. Today it is a small village that has a population of about 167 people.

A heritage walk around the village can be downloaded from the village website (see below).
