= Thornholme Priory =

English priory in Lincolnshire

Coordinates: 53°36′02″N 0°32′33″W

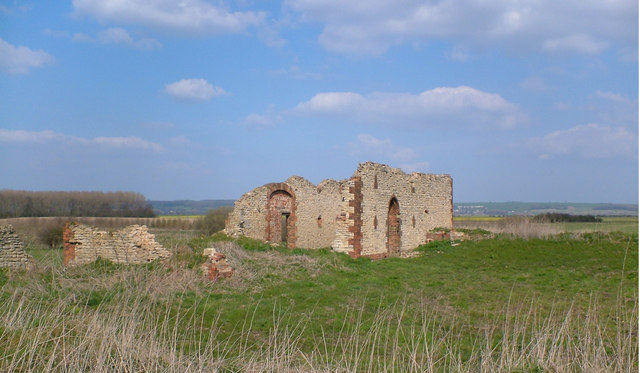
Ruins of a farm built with material from Thornholme Priory.

Thornholme Priory was a priory in Lincolnshire, England, lying on the western side of the Ancholme carrs between the villages of Broughton and Appleby.

The Priory of the Blessed Virgin Mary at Thornholme was an Augustinian priory founded in the mid twelfth century during the reign of King Stephen. It lasted until 1536 and the Dissolution of the monasteries under Henry VIII. It is a Scheduled Monument listed by Historic England since 1966.
