= Stainfield =

Village and civil parish in Lincolnshire, England

Coordinates: 53.243979°N 0.337983°W

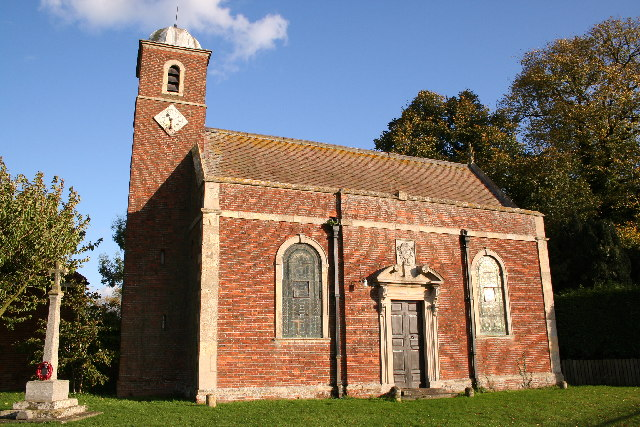
- St Andrew's Church, Stainfield

- Location within Lincolnshire
- Population: 189 (2011)
- OS grid reference: TF110731
  - London: 120 mi (190 km) S
- District: West Lindsey
- Shire county: Lincolnshire
- Region: East Midlands
- Country: England
- Sovereign state: United Kingdom
- Post town: MARKET RASEN
- Postcode district: LN8
- Dialling code: 01526
- Police: Lincolnshire
- Fire: Lincolnshire
- Ambulance: East Midlands
- UK Parliament: Grantham and Bourne

Stainfield is a village and civil parish about 10 miles (16 km) east of the city of Lincoln, in the West Lindsey district of Lincolnshire, England. The population of the civil parish at the 2011 census was 189.

== History ==
The name Stainfield derives from "a stony clearing", from the Old Norse 'steinn' and 'thveit'.

In 1086 Stainfield was named as Stainfelde and Stain' in the ancient wapentake of Wraggoe in the South Riding of Lindsey, Lincolnshire.

== St Andrews Church ==
The Grade II* listed red brick and limestone parish church is dedicated to Saint Andrew and dates from 1711, mostly rebuilt in the 19th century by James Fowler. The pews and pulpit are 18th-century. Inside are a helmet, gauntlets and sword said to have belonged to the Wild Man of Stainfield.

== The Wild Man of Stainfield ==
One of Lincolnshire's legends tells of a wild man who lived in the woods near Stainfield. The story appears in Folklore around Horncastle (1915) by Revd James Alpas Penny, who writes that in Stainfield church is the helmet of one of the Tyrwhitts of Stainfield, with the family crest of a wild man with a dagger. He recounts the legend that one Francis Tyrwhitt-Drake was promised all the land in Stainfield if he could kill the wild man who had terrorised the district. As he lay asleep, Drake ran the wild man through with his sword. A variation of this story, set in the 12th century, identifies the wild man as a Stainfield nobleman who had been away fighting in the Crusades for so long that when he returned he found he had been dispossessed. He went on to live in the woods, where he became so dangerous that Drake-Tyrwhitt was forced to kill him. It has been suggested that the story was put about to explain the relics in St Andrews belonging to the Tyrwhitt family, which included tattered cloth hanging from the wall reputed to be the wild man's clothing, and the dagger, gloves, and helmet said to belong to the man who killed him. In fact, the rags were the tattered remnants of the three banners embroidered by the ladies of the Tyrwhitt family, now in the care of the Archives Office in Lincoln. According to another variation on the legend the wildman was killed by a band of farmers incensed that their livestock was being taken and their families terrorised. The farmers, who went on to be known as "The Hardy Gang", trapped and killed the wildman in a wood between Langton and Stainfield.

== Priory and Hall ==
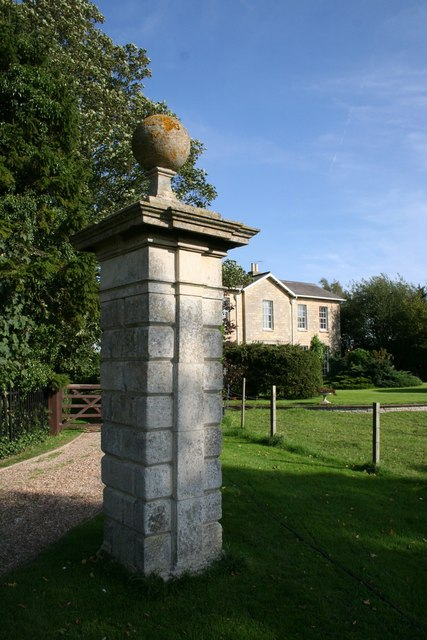
Stainfield Hall with early-18th century gate pier

Stainfield Priory was a benedictine nunnery founded about 1154. At the Dissolution of the Monasteries the site of Stainfield Priory was given to Sir Robert Tyrwhitt, who built Stainfield Hall on the site. It was rebuilt in 1611 with later additions in the early-18th century and had formal gardens associated with it. After 1760 the house fell into disrepair and was mostly pulled down in 1773. The remaining south front was destroyed by fire in 1855. The present building dates from 1856.

== School ==
Stainfield CE School opened as a National school in 1817 It became a junior and infant school in 1946, and closed 1971.
