= 1901 Kesteven County Council election =

1901 English local government election

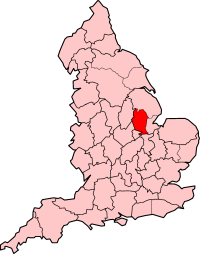
The administrative county of Kesteven (1889–1974), shown within England.

The fifth set of elections to Kesteven County Council were held on Thursday, 7 March 1901. Kesteven was one of three divisions of the historic county of Lincolnshire in England; it consisted of the ancient wapentakes (or hundreds) of Aswardhurn, Aveland, Beltisloe, Boothby Graffoe, Flaxwell, Langoe, Loveden, Ness, and Winnibriggs and Threo. The Local Government Act 1888 established Kesteven as an administrative county, governed by a Council; elections were held every three years from 1889, until it was abolished by the Local Government Act 1972, which established Lincolnshire County Council in its place.

Nearly every candidate was returned unopposed in the election, with contests in only seven of the 48 divisions. No party affiliation is recorded for any of the candidates, except those for Gonerby and Osbournby.

== Results by division ==
=== Ancaster ===
Ancaster
| Party | Candidate | Votes | % | ±% |
|---|---|---|---|---|
| | William Avery | NA | NA | |

=== Barrowby ===
Barrowby
| Party | Candidate | Votes | % | ±% |
|---|---|---|---|---|
| | Thomas Sherwin Pearson-Gregory | NA | NA | |

=== Bassingham ===
Bassingham
| Party | Candidate | Votes | % | ±% |
|---|---|---|---|---|
| | Charles Constable Curtis | NA | NA | |

=== Bennington ===
Bennington
| Party | Candidate | Votes | % | ±% |
|---|---|---|---|---|
| | William Hutchinson | NA | NA | |

=== Billingborough ===
Billingborough
| Party | Candidate | Votes | % | ±% |
|---|---|---|---|---|
| | Colonel de Burton | 226 | | |
| | Benjamin Smith | 153 | | |

=== Billinghay ===
Billinghay
| Party | Candidate | Votes | % | ±% |
|---|---|---|---|---|
| | John Creasey | NA | NA | |

=== Bourne and Morton ===
Bourne and Morton
| Party | Candidate | Votes | % | ±% |
|---|---|---|---|---|
| | A. Farr | | | |

=== Bracebridge ===
Bracebridge
| Party | Candidate | Votes | % | ±% |
|---|---|---|---|---|
| | T. Skipworth | 157 | | |
| | S. Wills | 139 | | |

=== Branston ===
Branston
| Party | Candidate | Votes | % | ±% |
|---|---|---|---|---|
| | Alexander Brodrick Leslie-Melville | NA | NA | |

=== Bytham ===
Bytham
| Party | Candidate | Votes | % | ±% |
|---|---|---|---|---|
| | Frederick William Williamson | NA | NA | |

=== Caythorpe ===
Caythorpe
| Party | Candidate | Votes | % | ±% |
|---|---|---|---|---|
| | William Oxley | NA | NA | |

=== Claypole ===
Claypole
| Party | Candidate | Votes | % | ±% |
|---|---|---|---|---|
| | George Nevile | NA | NA | |

=== Colsterworth ===
Colsterworth
| Party | Candidate | Votes | % | ±% |
|---|---|---|---|---|
| | Eli Crabtree | NA | NA | |

=== Corby ===
Corby
| Party | Candidate | Votes | % | ±% |
|---|---|---|---|---|
| | Joseph A. Wilson | 111 | | |
| | Henry Minta | 99 | | |
| | Rev. J. W. Layng (Note: Rector of Creeton and Swinstead) | 51 | | |

=== Deeping ===
Deeping
| Party | Candidate | Votes | % | ±% |
|---|---|---|---|---|
| | R. Wade | NA | NA | |

=== Gonerby ===
Gonerby
| Party | Candidate | Votes | % | ±% |
|---|---|---|---|---|
| Conservative | George W. Harvey | 229 | | |
| Conservative | Charles J. E. Parker | 84 | | |

=== Grantham no. 1 ===
Grantham no. 1
| Party | Candidate | Votes | % | ±% |
|---|---|---|---|---|
| | William Bailey | NA | NA | |

=== Grantham no. 2 ===
Grantham no. 2
| Party | Candidate | Votes | % | ±% |
|---|---|---|---|---|
| | James Perkins Coultas | NA | NA | |

=== Grantham no. 3 ===
Grantham no. 3
| Party | Candidate | Votes | % | ±% |
|---|---|---|---|---|
| | Arthur Hutchinson | NA | NA | |

=== Grantham no. 4 ===
Grantham no. 4
| Party | Candidate | Votes | % | ±% |
|---|---|---|---|---|
| | Rev. George Benson Bowler | NA | NA | |

=== Grantham no. 5 ===
Grantham no. 5
| Party | Candidate | Votes | % | ±% |
|---|---|---|---|---|
| | William Long Wand | NA | NA | |

=== Grantham no. 6 ===
Grantham no. 6
| Party | Candidate | Votes | % | ±% |
|---|---|---|---|---|
| | John William Martin | NA | NA | |

=== Grantham no. 7 ===
Grantham no. 7
| Party | Candidate | Votes | % | ±% |
|---|---|---|---|---|
| | Joshua Lincoln | NA | NA | |

=== Heckington ===
Heckington
| Party | Candidate | Votes | % | ±% |
|---|---|---|---|---|
| | Daniel Gorham Harris | NA | NA | |

=== Heighington ===
Heighington
| Party | Candidate | Votes | % | ±% |
|---|---|---|---|---|
| | Samuel Oglesby | NA | NA | |

=== Helpringham ===
Helpringham
| Party | Candidate | Votes | % | ±% |
|---|---|---|---|---|
| | Joseph Senior Barber | NA | NA | |

=== Kyme ===
Kyme
| Party | Candidate | Votes | % | ±% |
|---|---|---|---|---|
| | J. W. Palmer | | | |
| | Charles Claydon | | | |

N.B. It is not clear from the results reports who won this division.

=== Martin ===
Martin
| Party | Candidate | Votes | % | ±% |
|---|---|---|---|---|
| | John Hague Copping | NA | NA | |

=== Metheringham ===
Metheringham
| Party | Candidate | Votes | % | ±% |
|---|---|---|---|---|
| | Edward Godson Allen | NA | NA | |

=== Morton ===
Morton
| Party | Candidate | Votes | % | ±% |
|---|---|---|---|---|
| | John Thomas Swift | NA | NA | |

=== Navenby ===
Navenby
| Party | Candidate | Votes | % | ±% |
|---|---|---|---|---|
| | Dr Andrew Campbell | NA | NA | |

=== Osbournby ===
Osbournby
| Party | Candidate | Votes | % | ±% |
|---|---|---|---|---|
| Conservative | Captain William Alfred Cragg | NA | NA | |

=== Ponton ===
Ponton
| Party | Candidate | Votes | % | ±% |
|---|---|---|---|---|
| | Robert Christian Newton | NA | NA | |

=== Rippingale ===
Rippingale
| Party | Candidate | Votes | % | ±% |
|---|---|---|---|---|
| | Arthur Wellesley Dean | NA | NA | |

=== Ropsley ===
Ropsley
| Party | Candidate | Votes | % | ±% |
|---|---|---|---|---|
| | James Cecil Rudkin | NA | NA | |

=== Ruskington ===
Ruskington
| Party | Candidate | Votes | % | ±% |
|---|---|---|---|---|
| | Samuel Francis Pattinson | NA | NA | |

=== Skellingthorpe ===
Skellingthorpe
| Party | Candidate | Votes | % | ±% |
|---|---|---|---|---|
| | Captain George Eden Jarvis | NA | NA | |

=== Sleaford East ===
Sleaford East
| Party | Candidate | Votes | % | ±% |
|---|---|---|---|---|
| | W. H. Spite | 277 | | |
| | H. A. Peake | 186 | | |

=== Sleaford West ===
Sleaford West
| Party | Candidate | Votes | % | ±% |
|---|---|---|---|---|
| | W. B. Harris | 298 | | |
| | Charles Attiwell | 135 | | |

=== Stamford no. 1 ===
Stamford no. 1
| Party | Candidate | Votes | % | ±% |
|---|---|---|---|---|
| | J. Woolston | NA | NA | |

=== Stamford no. 2 ===
Stamford no. 2
| Party | Candidate | Votes | % | ±% |
|---|---|---|---|---|
| | J. Seaton Loweth | NA | NA | |

=== Stamford no. 3 ===
Stamford no. 3
| Party | Candidate | Votes | % | ±% |
|---|---|---|---|---|
| | Major Herbert Hart | NA | NA | |

=== Stamford no. 4 ===
Stamford no. 4
| Party | Candidate | Votes | % | ±% |
|---|---|---|---|---|
| | George Higgs | NA | NA | |

=== Thurlby ===
Thurlby
| Party | Candidate | Votes | % | ±% |
|---|---|---|---|---|
| | W. Hayes | NA | NA | |

=== Uffington ===
Uffington
| Party | Candidate | Votes | % | ±% |
|---|---|---|---|---|
| | The Lord Kesteven | NA | NA | |

=== Waddington ===
Waddington
| Party | Candidate | Votes | % | ±% |
|---|---|---|---|---|
| | Hugh Jackson | NA | NA | |

=== Wellingore ===
Wellingore
| Party | Candidate | Votes | % | ±% |
|---|---|---|---|---|
| | Robert Newcombe Moreley | NA | NA | |

=== Wilsford ===
Wilsford
| Party | Candidate | Votes | % | ±% |
|---|---|---|---|---|
| | Richard Montagu Cole | NA | NA | |

== By-elections ==
=== Billinghay, 1901 ===
John Creasey, the sitting councillor of the Billinghay division, died on 30 October 1901. Three candidates emerged to fill the vacancy created by his death: John William Palmer, a merchant; John Edward South, a miller and merchant; and William Ravell, a farmer and auctioneer. The election was held on Friday, 6 December. According to the Grantham Journal, "all parties work[ed] hard for success"; canvassing was carried out in Billinghay and Walcott and Palmer and Ravell addressed voters in both villages in the week before the election.

The results were as follows:

| Candidate | Votes |
|---|---|
| William Ravell | 197 |
| John William Palmer | 158 |
| John Edward South | 3 |

Ravell was therefore returned as the councillor for the division.
