= Legbourne Priory =

Priory in Legbourne, England

Coordinates: 53.337200°N 0.043143°E

Legbourne Priory was a priory in the village of Legbourne, Lincolnshire, England.

Founded by Robert Fitz Gilbert around 1150, the priory was for the nuns of Keddington (sometimes Hallington). The earliest visitation that survives is from 1440 when Bishop Alnwick reported a few irregularities which needed correction, but found most fault with the Prioress. She had been too fond of entertaining her own relations, and partly supported them with revenue from the priory. She had admitted an unlicensed chaplain to preach in the church, and counselled her nuns not to report anything amiss at the visitation.

The priory was dissolved in 1536 on the grounds it had income of less than £200 per year. The last prioress being Joan Missenden The house was not, however, entirely dismantled at the time of the Lincolnshire Uprising. The king's commissioners, Millicent and Bellow, were still in the priory and busy at their work, when they were dragged out of it by the excited mob.

The site of the priory is an ancient scheduled monument.
