= Willoughton Priory =

Priory in Lincolnshire, England

Coordinates: 53.427548°N 000.598378°W

Monk's Garth Moated Site in Willoughton, the site of Willoughton Priory.

Willoughton Priory was an alien priory (priory controlled by an overseas religious house) in Willoughton, Lincolnshire, England.

It was built some time during the 12th century when Empress Maud granted the priory to the Benedictine Abbey of St. Nicholas in Angers, France. The property was confiscated by King Henry VI in 1441 and was given to King's College, Cambridge. There is no structure remaining, but there are earthworks showing where the priory once stood.
