= Broadholme Priory =

Former monastery in Lincolnshire, England

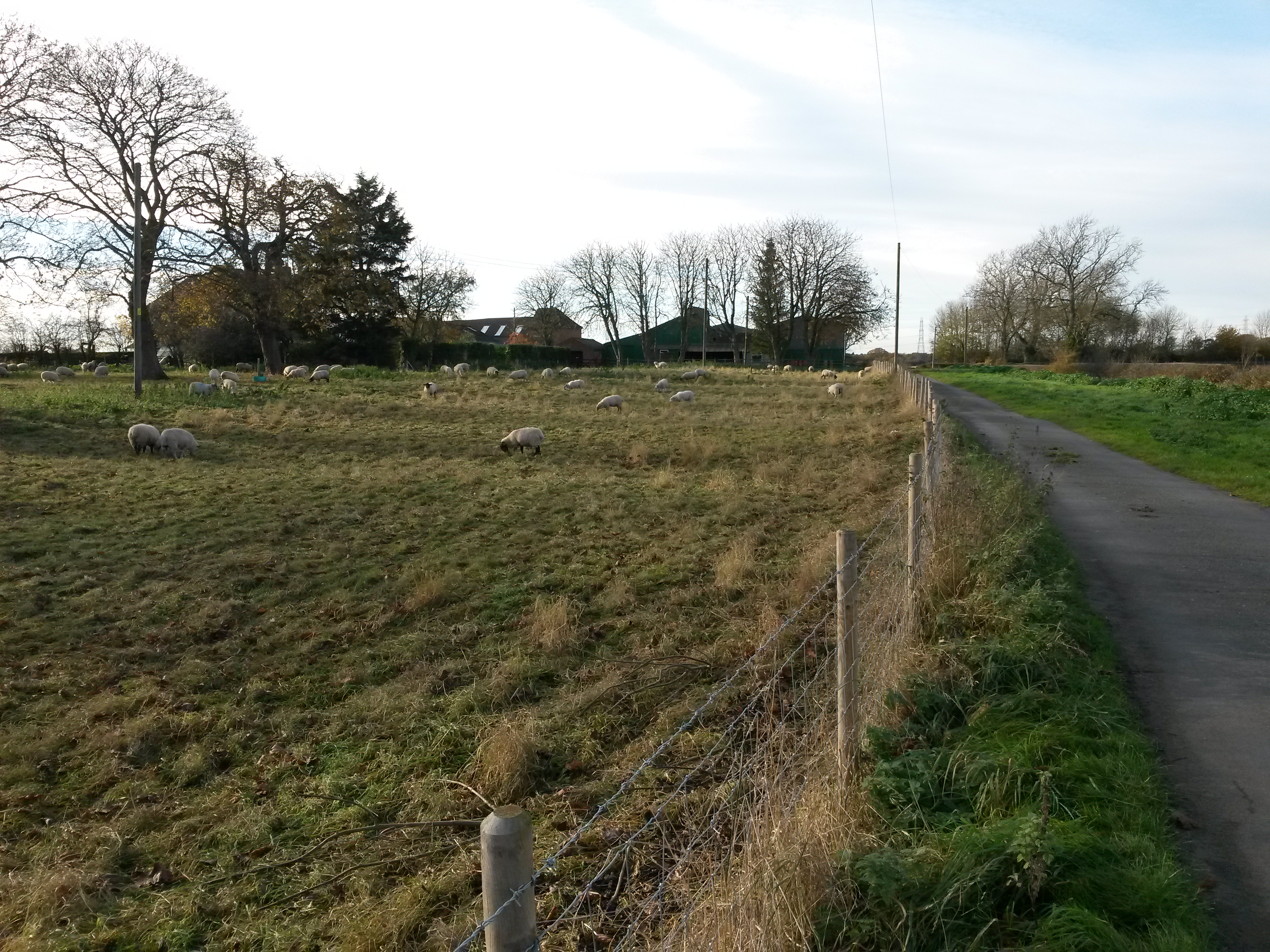
- The site of Broadholme Priory on the edge of Skellingthorpe's woods

- Location within Lincolnshire
- Interactive map of Broadholme Priory

Monastery information
- Other names: The Convent of St. Mary's, Broadholme,
- Order: Premonstratensian
- Established: Before 1154
- Disestablished: 1536
- Mother house: Newsham Abbey
- Dedication: God and St. Mary

Site
- Location: Lincolnshire, England; Before 1989: Nottinghamshire
- Coordinates: 53.2514°N 0.6609°W
- Grid reference: SK 8950 7353
- Visible remains: None Visible. Elements of the monastic buildings thought to have been incorporated into Manor Farm.

Broadholme Priory was a convent of canonesses of the Premonstratensian Order located near to the village of Broadholme. Historically in Nottinghamshire, since boundary changes in 1989, the priory and village has been in Lincolnshire.

== History ==
The priory was founded before 1154. It was home to the Premonstratensian canonesses and was one of only two female priories of that order in England (the other being Orford Priory). When it was founded, however, it was initially home to both canons and canonesses. The priory was dedicated to God and St Mary, and its mother-house was Newsham Abbey in Lincolnshire.

Pope Nicholas IV's taxation roll records the priory as having an income of £4 13s. The priory was also in control of the church at Thorney, Nottinghamshire, which provided an additional £8 annual income.

The priory was given a charter of confirmation by King Edward II in 1318. The charter reveals several of the priory's benefactors, including donations by:

- Ralph D'Aubeney – an orchard adjacent to the cemetery of St Botolph's church, Saxilby
- Hugh de Basset – "rents" in Newark, Nottinghamshire and two quarters of corn
- Peter de Campania – land at Stow, Lincolnshire
- Richard de Claypole – land in North Collingham
- Walter and Agnes de Clifford – Thorney church, land and a mill;
- Geoffrey de Crosby – land in Ingleby
- Walter Faber – land at Torksey
- Peter and Agnes Goushill (and their children)– large amounts of land and several tenements in Saxilby
- Simon de Hale – land at Little Hale
- Ralph de Muscamp and Isabel (daughter of Alured de Collingham) – "rents" in Collingham
- William Newbrid – "rents" in Broadholme
- Baldwin Wake – "rents" in Skellingthorpe
- William Wynok – a "toft" in Fillingham
- Aubrea and Ivo ("children of Ralph, son of Lambert") – "lands and rents in the parish of Sir Edward Wigford" (Lincoln)

Queen Isabel (consort of King Edward II) was a patroness of the canonesses and is known "for the special affection which she bore to them". In 1327 she donated the annual sum of 8 marks to the priory from her lands at Great Massingham in Norfolk. In 1329 the Sheriff of Norfolk was given responsibility for ensuring the canonesses received their payment. In October 1327 Isabel arranged the transfer of the mortmain of certain lands to the priory, valued as worth £10 per year.

In 1478 the priory was visited, and it was recorded that all of the canonesses could read and sing.

In 1494 the priory was recorded as home to the prioress and eight canonesses:

- Dame Elizabeth Brerworth (priorissa)
- Johanna Stertone (suppriorissa)
- Dame Elizabeth Formane
- Agnes Aschby
- Johanna Newsome
- Margery Robynsone
- Johanna Roos
- Johanna Steyntone
- Johanna Uptone

The Valor Ecclesiasticus of 1534 records the gross annual value of this small priory as £18 11s. 10d.

The priory was dissolved in 1536. On 12 December 1536 the last prioress, Joan Aungewen (or Angevin), was assigned a pension of 7 marks.

The site was granted by the Crown to Ralph Jackson in 1537.

=== Remains ===
The remains of the monastic buildings are thought to have been incorporated into Manor Farm, which was built on the site; there are, however, no visible architectural remains. The priory chapel was located at the back of the current house and the cemetery was to the east in an area occupied by an orchard. The priory's former fishponds were filled in during the 1960s.

== Prioresses of Broadholme ==
- Matilda, occurs 1326
- Joan de Rield, occurs 1354
- Agnes de Belyngham, occurs in 1418
- Elizabeth de Brerworth, occurs 1496
- Joan Aungewen, occurs 1534 and 1536
