= Boston Friary =

Refers to any one of four friaries that existed in Boston, Lincolnshire, England

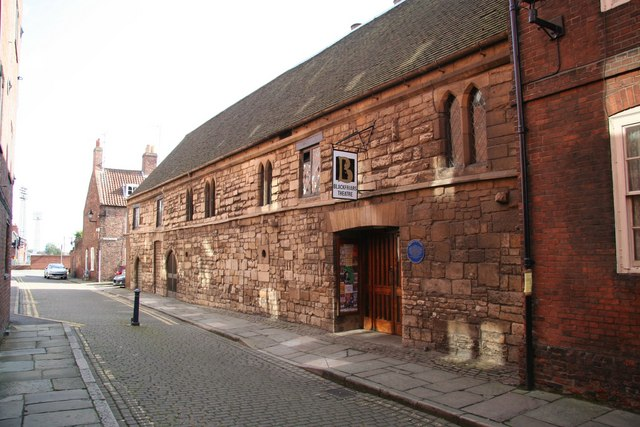
Blackfriars Arts Centre - remains of the Dominican Friary, Boston

Boston Friary refers to any one of four friaries that existed in Boston, Lincolnshire, England.

== The Augustinian Friary ==
52.9717°N 0.0192°W
The Augustinian Friary was founded 1317/18 and was sited near St John's Churchyard in Skirbeck. Land was acquired from Andrew son of Robert atte Gote or Gotere in 1318, John de la Gotere in 1327, John de Moulton and John Leeke in 1342. There were twenty friars here in 1328. It was Surrendered in 1539 to the Bishop of Dover and leased in 1541 to Thomas Browne, but bought by the town in 1544/5 In 1573 the site was leased to Anthony Kime. Today the greater part of the site is covered by the old Union Workhouse.

== The Carmelite Friary ==
First Friary 52.9752°N 0.0266°W
Later Friary 52.9753°N 0.0256°W
The Carmelites known in medieval England as the White Friars, were established in 1293 originally in Skirbeck, but later at a site off the High Street opposite Doughty Quay, which they bought from John Parleben in 1308, having been granted permission to erect a church by King Edward II. They bought more land in 1315/16. In 1349 Simon Lambert gave them more land, and a year later they received four acres from Sir John de Orreby. Following the Dissolution of the Monasteries, about 1544/5, the town of Boston purchased the White Friars site.

== The Dominican Friary ==
52.9756°N 0.0227°W
The Dominicans were known in medieval England as the Shod Friars or more commonly the Black Friars. The Friary was founded in 1222. In 1288 their buildings, along with a large area of the town, were burnt during St Botolphs Fair, and in 1290 they were given eight oaks from Sherwood Forest by the King. In 1327 they were given a royal licence to build a subterranean aqueduct from Bolingbroke to their house. The friary was forceably closed in 1539 in the Dissolution of the Monasteries, and in 1540 the land confiscated from the friars was granted to the Duke of Suffolk. The refectory of the Dominican friary is the only part of any of the local friaries still in existence. It is Grade II* listed, and houses the Blackfriars Arts Centre.

== The Franciscan Friary ==
52.9748°N 0.0217°W
The Franciscans were known as the Grey Friars and their house was established at an unknown date prior to 1268. According to Leland, the Franciscans mixed with the Esterlings (European merchants), and many were buried there. Among those was Wisselus de Smallenburg, a merchant from Munster, who died in 1340, and whose grave slab today lies in St Botolph's Church, Boston. The friary was seized in 1539, and valued at 44s. a year. While at first reserved for the King, it was then sold off to the town in 1544/5.
