= Nuncotham Priory =

Priory in Brocklesby, England

Coordinates: 53.58463°N 0.25701°W

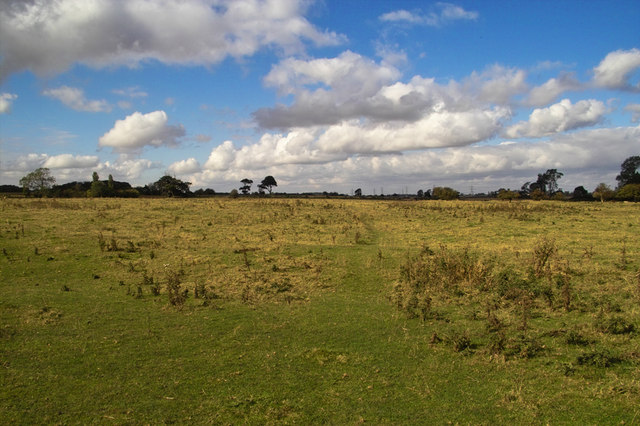
Site of Nuncotham Priory

Nuncotham Priory was a priory of Cistercian nuns in Brocklesby, Lincolnshire, England.

The priory of Nuncotham in Brocklesby parish was founded by Alan de Moncels around 1150. Throughout its history the Bishops complained that the nuns lived a little too freely. Joan Thompson, the last prioress, had a habit of keeping her own family at the convents expense, and the sisters had a habit of going out to visit friends.

It was Dissolved in 1539.

There are earthworks covering a wide area which indicate the remains of building sites, fishponds, and several moat-like features. The site is scheduled.
