= Haugham Priory =

Benedictine foundation in Lincolnshire, England

Coordinates: 53.3154°N 0.0038°E

Haugham Priory was a Benedictine priory in Lincolnshire, England.

The priory of Haugham was built upon land granted by Hugh, Earl of Chester, at the end of the 11th century, to the abbot and convent of Sainte-Marie-et-Saint-Sever, Saint-Sever-Calvados in the diocese of Coutances. It is likely that it was only intended for the support of one or two monks. Priors were, however, regularly appointed and admitted by the bishops of Lincoln until 1329, when the wars with France created the same difficulties as in other small cells of alien houses.

In 1337 the prior, on the plea of poverty, obtained the restitution of his possessions, which had been seized by the King, and then let the priory to John of Saint Paul to farm for seven years. After John, the King let the priory out again to the Bishop of Carlisle. In 1397 it was granted to the Carthusian priory of St. Anne in Coventry. There are no remains evident.
