= Minting Priory =

Monastery in Lincolnshire, England

Coordinates: 53.24512°N 0.224958°W

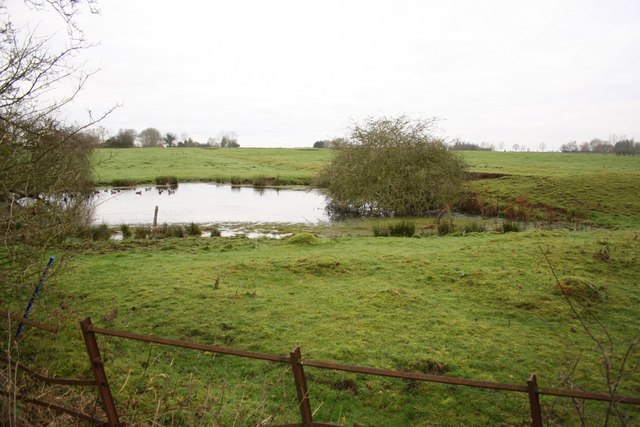
Site of Priory

Minting Priory was a priory in Minting, Lincolnshire, England.

The priory for Benedictine monks was founded by Ranulf de Meschines, earl of Chester, to the abbey of Fleury. The grant was made before 1129, but it is uncertain when the priory was built as the earliest mention of a prior is in 1213.

The priory was in the hands of the King in 1337, 1344, and 1346 on account of the wars with France, and in 1421 it was granted to the Carthusian priory of Mount Grace.
