= Markby Priory =

Priory in Markby, Lincolnshire, England

Coordinates: 53.28478°N 0.2299°E

Markby Priory was a priory in the village of Markby, Lincolnshire, England.

It is believed the Augustinian Priory was founded during the reign of Henry II, although there is no mention of it before 1204. The founder, Ralf Fitz Gilbert, was already dead, and his lands in the possession of his grandson, Hugh. Another early benefactor was Alan of Mumby, who granted the Canons the church at Mumby and one at Wycliff, in Yorkshire. In 1438 Bishop Alnwick made a visitation and recorded that this priory was in worse condition than any other in the county. The bishop prefaced his injunctions by saying that he had heard of many excesses here, both in religion and in the observation of rule, and in administration; and when he came he had found his worst expectations fulfilled, 'not even the shadow of religion,' he said, but debts, drinking, and suspicion of even worse sins. The prior allowed that his house was 100 marks in debt, and that silence was badly kept throughout the monastery, even in the church and cloister; that neither senior nor junior canons practised contemplation, and that one Thomas Dugby was suspected of sinful intercourse with a woman at Markby. The sub-prior also allowed that religion was not kept, and seconded the complaints of the prior; on the other hand, all the canons joined in complaining of the incompetence of the prior, and negligence of the sub-prior. It was generally allowed that the canons went out without leave, and ate and drank in the town; one indeed went to his mother's house every day, and was almost the same as an apostate. Two went constantly to taverns. Thomas Dugby confessed the sin of incontinence charged against him, and was put to penance. The prior felt it best to resign. Things had improved somewhat by 1819 when Bishop Atwater visited, and found some irregularities but no great faults.

The last prior was John Penketh. In 1534 there were eight canons and the prior, and the priory was dissolved at the first Act of Suppression in 1536.

The thatched church at Markby is believed to have been built of stone from the old priory, and the bell is believed to be the priory's refectory bell.

The site of the priory is now occupied by a 16th-century Grade II listed farmhouse.
