= Wellow Abbey =

Abbey in Lincolnshire, England

Wellow Abbey was an abbey in Lincolnshire, England. It was founded about 1110 by Henry I of England, as a house of Austin canons. The date of foundation is not known precisely. It was also known as Grimsby Abbey.

The last abbot was Robert Whitgift, uncle of John Whitgift. The Abbey was dissolved in 1536, and he was given a pension.

The abbey was built on a hill, and its grounds covered around ten acres, surrounded by a wall and ditch. Buildings included a grange for the abbot and a kitchen, which was built above a spring that also supplied water to a mill at the base of the hill. At the Dissolution of the Monasteries its possessions included more than seven hundred acres of land.
