= Newark Friary =

Franciscan friary in Nottinghamshire

- Location within Nottinghamshire
- Interactive map of Newark Friary

Monastery information
- Other names: Newark Greyfriars; Newark Observant Friary
- Order: Franciscan Observant Friars
- Established: c.1499
- Disestablished: 1539

People
- Founder: Henry VII of England

Site
- Location: Newark, Nottinghamshire
- Coordinates: 53.077663°N 0.804255°W
- Visible remains: None

Newark Friary, also known as Newark Greyfriars and Newark Observant Friary, was a friary of the reformed "Observant Friars" of the Franciscan Order, located in the town of Newark, Nottinghamshire, England. The friary as founded by Henry VII around 1499, and dissolved by his son Henry VIII in 1539.

== History ==
The friary was founded around 1499 by Henry VII, who had become the patron of the reformed branch of the Franciscan order, known as the "Friars Observant". Following his death in 1509, Henry left £200 to the friary in his will.

Despite being founded in 1499, the friary may not have been established until 1507.

The Observant Friars were suppressed in 1534, at which point the friary passed to the Augustinian friars. The friary was finally dissolved in 1539, as part of King Henry VIII's dissolution of the monasteries.

In July 1543, the former friary site, churchyard and several associated gardens were granted to Richard Andrewes (sic) and Nicholas Temple.

The site is now occupied by a house known as "The Friary". Nothing remains of the original friary, with only small fragments incorporated into the later building. The house called The Friary was owned by the Branston family, wealthy maltsters who were later ranked amongst the landed gentry on their purchase in 1897 of Branston, Lincolnshire, the head being the cricketer (George) Trevor Branston.

Excavation work at the site, conducted in 1978, discovered a cemetery. However, "Any associations between the cemetery and the [friary] building can only be inferred".
