= Broughton, Lincolnshire =

Town and civil parish in Lincolnshire, England

Coordinates: 53.5638°N 0.5465°W

Broughton
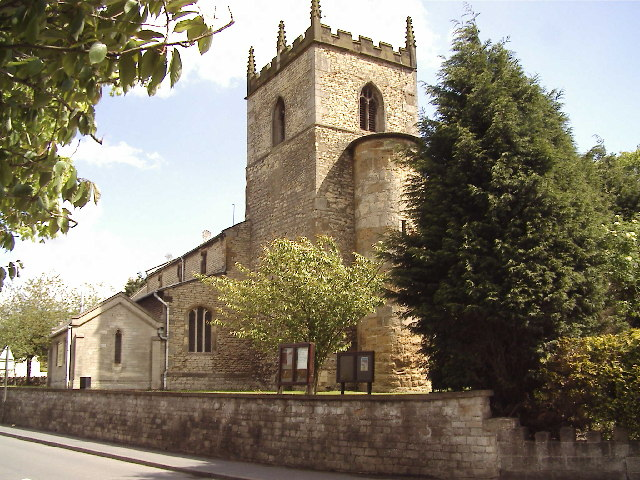
- St Mary's Church, Broughton

- Location within Lincolnshire
- Population: 5,726 2011 Census
- OS grid reference: SE963084
  - London: 140 mi (230 km) S
- Unitary authority: North Lincolnshire
- Ceremonial county: Lincolnshire
- Region: Yorkshire and the Humber
- Country: England
- Sovereign state: United Kingdom
- Post town: BRIGG
- Postcode district: DN20
- Dialling code: 01652
- Police: Humberside
- Fire: Humberside
- Ambulance: East Midlands
- UK Parliament: Brigg and Immingham

Broughton is a town and civil parish situated on the Roman Ermine Street, in the North Lincolnshire district of Lincolnshire, England. The population of the civil parish at the 2011 census was 5,726. In 2021, the population was 5,434. It is situated approximately 2 miles (3 km) north-west from the town of Brigg. The hamlets of Wressle, Castlethorpe, and part of Scawby Brook lie within the parish boundaries.

A settlement existed at Broughton in the Neolithic Stone Age (New Stone Age). Stone tools have been found particularly on the commons near Wressle. Pottery was discovered at a house on Ermine Street in 1956, thought to date back to the Bronze Age period. There were burials discovered around 1850 in the commons to the north-east of Broughton.

The name Broughton derives from either the Old English burhtūn (fort settlement) or bergtūn (burial mound settlement).

Broughton's St Mary's Church is a Grade I listed building, with a very rare Saxon staircase tower, one of four in the country. The others are at Brixworth, Brigstock and Hough-on-the-Hill. The church is thought to date to the 11th century with major alterations in the 12th, 14th and 17th centuries. Gokewell Priory was founded nearby in the late 12th century to house a community of nuns.

The Baronetcy of Broughton was created 11 December 1660 for Sir Edmund Anderson, 1st Baronet, and became extinct on the death of Sir Charles Henry John Anderson, 9th Baronet, on 8 October 1891.

To the west and north, Broughton has extensive woodlands that stretch toward Dragonby, Scunthorpe and Appleby. The south of the woods sits one of the few 4-star hotels in the area, and which has a 27-hole golf course (formerly Forest Pines, now Doubletree by Hilton – though still commonly known as Forest Pines).

Though considered by many to be a village, it became a town in 1974, although it still has a village hall. At the 2011 census, the size of Broughton parish was slightly larger than its neighbour Brigg, due to housing developments at the edge of the parish in Scawby Brook.

== Gallery ==
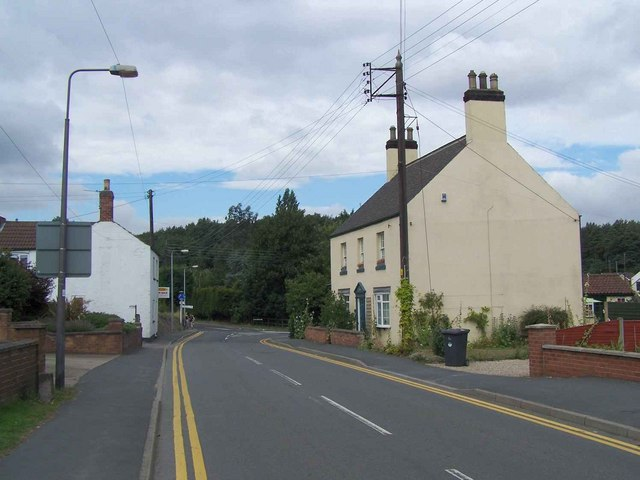
West Broughton

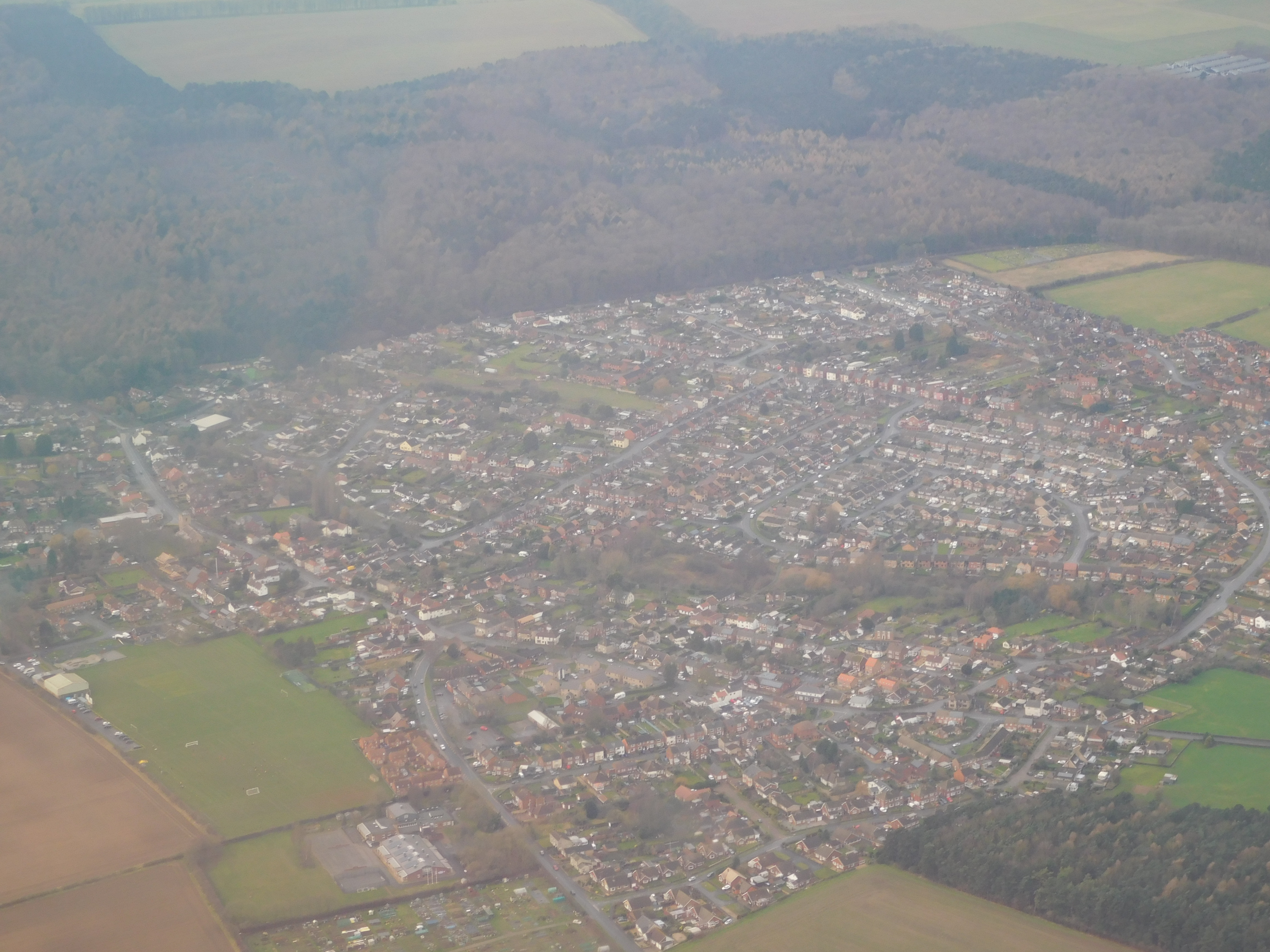
Aerial photograph of Broughton looking north west in January 2022

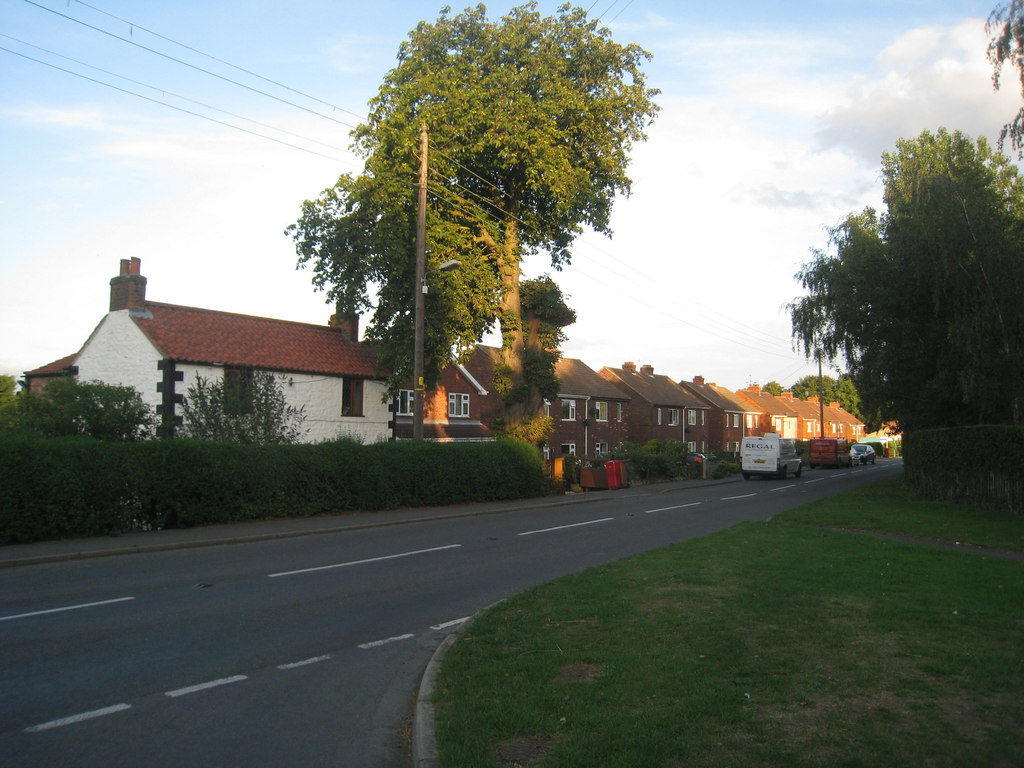
Brigg Road, Wressle

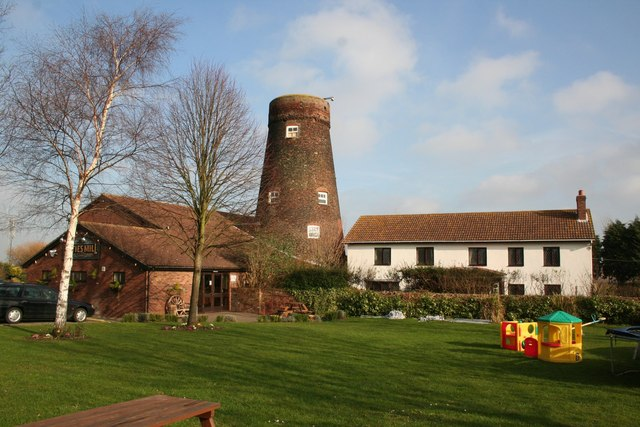
Former tower mill, Castlethorpe
