= Newstead-on-Ancholme Priory =

Monastery in Cadney, Lincolnshire, England

Coordinates: 53.5271°N 0.49351°W

Newstead-on-Ancholme Priory was a priory in Lincolnshire, England.

The Gilbertine priory of Holy Trinity, Newstead-on-Ancholme, was founded for Gilbertine canons by King Henry II in 1171. The endowment was small, and the number of canons and lay brothers was limited by Saint Gilbert to thirteen.

The priory was surrendered in 1538, by the prior, Robert Hobson, and five canons. Newstead Priory farmhouse, a grade I listed building was built on the site, and one room in the farmhouse is a vaulted room of the Gibertine priory, possibly part of the refectory.
