= Bridgend Priory =

Monastery in Lincolnshire, England

Coordinates: 52.9109°N 0.3009°W

Bridgend Priory was a monastic house in Horbling, Lincolnshire, England.

The priory was founded around 1199 by Godwin the Rich of Lincoln, a benefactor to the Gilbertine Order of Sempringham Priory. At Bridgend he gave the chapel of Saint Saviour and lands and tenements for the maintenance of a house for canons, and bound them to keep in repair the causeway through the fens called Holland Bridge and the bridges over it as far as the dike near Donington, which the canons found a heavy burden, and often complaints were made about the state of repair. In 1333 the prior appeared before Parliament and claimed their property was barely enough for the maintenance of the canons, and the repair of the causeway was only a secondary concern to them. It is unlikely that there were ever more than three or four canons and a few lay brothers at this priory.

In 1356 Edward III granted the right of holding a weekly market in Bridgend and of a yearly fair on the Feast of Saint Mary Magdalene, and a year later granted another fair on the Feast of Saint Luke.

In February 1445 a fire devastated the church and monastic buildings, and Alnwick Bishop of Lincoln issued an indulgence of forty days to all who should contribute before Michaelmas to the relief of the priory.

At the dissolution the house had become a cell of Sempringham, and was surrendered as part of the possessions of it in September 1538.

Stones from the priory were used to build nearby Priory Farm.
