= Torksey Priory =

Former monastery in Lincolnshire, England

Coordinates: 53.300891°N 0.744771°W

Torksey Priory was a priory in Lincolnshire, England. It was an Augustinian house and was dedicated to St Leonard. It is thought that the priory was founded in the time of King Henry II, possibly by the king himself. It had the three parish churches in Torksey annexed to it: All Saints, St Peter, St Mary.
