= Bonby Priory =

Monastery in Lincolnshire, England

Coordinates: 53.626555°N 0.483734°W

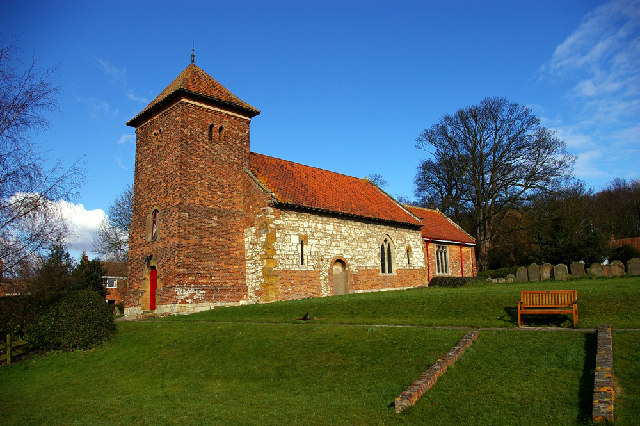
St Andrew's Church. All that remains of the Priory

Bonby Priory was a priory in Lincolnshire, England. St. Andrew's Church is all that remains of Bonby Priory, which was a Benedictine alien priory of St. Fromond Priory from 1199 to 1403. The priory was then rented to Beauvale Abbey and the church became parochial.

Map of Lincolnshire within England
