= Boston Priory =

Benedictine priory in Lincolnshire, England

Coordinates: 52°58′45″N 0°01′27″W

Boston Priory was a priory in Boston, Lincolnshire, England.

The origins of St Botolph's Church, Boston have their roots in the former priory church of the Benedictine monastery. The first church of St Botolph was granted to St Mary's Abbey, York, shortly after 1089 and a priory of monks was constituted. The foundations of this first church were discovered during restoration work on the north side of St Botolph's, 1851–3. There is no record of the priory after 1281, and the present church was not begun until 1309.
