= Maltby Preceptory =

Human settlement in the United Kingdom

Coordinates: 53.3403°N 0.0369°W

Maltby Preceptory was a house of the Knights Hospitaller in the village of Maltby, Lincolnshire, England. There are two differing accounts regarding its history.

It was established as a house during the reign of King Stephen around 1135-54 by Ranulf, Earl of Chester and included the church and Maltby, and land both there and in the villages of Tathwell and Rauceby. It closed at the dissolution of the Monasteries around 1540.

The Monastica Anglicanum claims it was a house of the Knights Templar and passed into the hands of the Hospitallers after the Templars were suppressed in 1312.
