= North Hykeham Priory =

Benedictine priory in Lincolnshire, England

Coordinates: 53.1809°N 0.5877°W

North Hykeham Priory was a priory in Lincolnshire, England.

This priory is only mentioned in the Patent Roll of Edward IV, 1462, when it was granted to the college called 'God's House,' at Cambridge. It is not at present known to what foreign house it had belonged, nor if there was ever an actual priory there at all.
