= Catley Priory =

Monastic house in Lincolnshire, England

Coordinates: 53°05′08″N 0°19′53″W

Catley Priory was a monastic house in Walcott, Lincolnshire, England.

The Gilbertine priory of Saint Mary, Catley, was founded as a double house for nuns and monks between 1154 and 1158 by Peter of Billinghay. He endowed it with the whole of the then island of Catley, the site of a grange and some arable land in Walcott, the church at Billinghay and the chapel at Walcott, pasture for four hundred sheep and right of fishing on Walcott marsh. The number of inmates was limited to sixty nuns and lay-sisters, and thirty-five canons and lay-brothers.

Always amongst the poorest of the Gilbertine houses, the priory was in serious financial trouble by 1338, and King Edward III excused them from payment of tax. Only seven years later the same event occurred.

The house was surrendered on 25 September 1538 by William Swift, the last Prior, and two of his canons. The site was eventually acquired by Robert Carr (sometimes Carre) of Sleaford. The site is an ancient scheduled monument.
