= Stainfield Priory =

English nunnery

Coordinates: 53°14′39″N 0°20′12″W

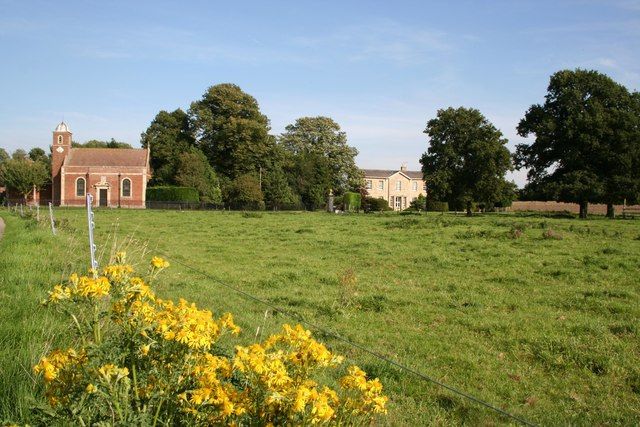
site of former Priory

Stainfield Priory was a Benedictine nunnery at Stainfield in the North of Lincolnshire, England, between Wragby and Fiskerton.

The priory of St Mary at Stainfield was the only nunnery of the Benedictine order in Lincolnshire. It was a small establishment intended to house up to 20 nuns, founded in around 1154 by Henry or William Percy, which survived until the dissolution in 1536.
