= Gokewell Priory =

Cistercian priory in Lincolnshire, England

Coordinates: 53.5807°N 0.5805°W

Gokewell Priory was a Cistercian Catholic priory in Broughton, Lincolnshire, England.

The priory was founded by William de Alta Ripa, and received financial support from Roger of St. Martin, Adam Paynel, and William de Romara. By 1440, the priory housed eight nuns; it was probably never much larger. On a visit, Bishop William Alnwick found the priory to be very poor, but in good order.

In early 1536, Gokewell Priory was permanently closed as part of the Dissolution of the Monasteries ordered by King Henry VIII.
