= Grimsby Nunnery =

Augustinian nunnery in Lincolnshire, England

Grimsby Priory, also known as Grimsby Nunnery and St. Leonard's Priory, was an Augustinian nunnery in Lincolnshire, England. It was founded before 1184, and dissolved in 1539.
