= Orford Priory =

Premonstratensian priory in Lincolnshire, England

Coordinates: 53.432268°N 0.217937°W

Orford Priory was a priory of Premonstratensian canonesses in Stainton le Vale, Lincolnshire, England, and one of nine within the historical county.

The priory of Orford, in Stainton-le-Vale, was probably built some time during the reign of King Henry II by Ralf d'Albini, in honour of the Virgin Mary.

A nun from Orford was excommunicated in 1491 by Bishop Redman for breach of her vow of chastity, her partner being a canon of Newsham.

There were seven nuns and a prioress when the priory was Dissolved in 1539.

The remains of the priory, and Post-medieval house and garden lie immediately south of the now derelict Priory farm.
