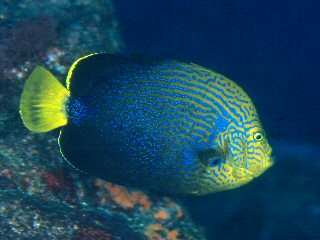

Conservation status
- Least Concern (IUCN 3.1)

Scientific classification
- Kingdom: Animalia
- Phylum: Chordata
- Class: Actinopterygii
- Order: Acanthuriformes
- Family: Pomacanthidae
- Genus: Chaetodontoplus
- Species: C. chrysocephalus

Binomial name
- Chaetodontoplus chrysocephalus (Bleeker, 1855)

Synonyms
- Holacanthus chrysocephalus Bleeker, 1855

= Orangeface angelfish =

Species of fish

The orangeface angelfish (Chaetodontoplus chrysocephalus), also known as the blue vermiculate angelfish or maze angelfish, is a species of marine ray-finned fish, a marine angelfish belonging to the family Pomacanthidae. It is found in the Pacific Ocean.

== Description ==
The orange face angelfish has a brownish-orange face which contrasts with the body's pattern of greenish-blue stripes. The body darkens to dark brown towards the vivid yellow caudal fin. The dorsal fin contains 13 spines and 17-18 soft rays while the anal fin contains 3 spines and 17-18 soft rays. This species attains a maximum total length of 22 centimetres (8.7 in).

== Distribution ==
The orange face angelfish is found in the western Pacific Ocean. It is a poorly known species which has been reliably reported only from the Java Sea of Indonesia. Records from other areas, such as the Philippines or Taiwan, are considered likely to be attributable to misidentifications of related species notably C. caeruleopunctatus and C. cephalareticulatus. The most recent report was around the year 2002 at Karimnjawa on the Java Sea.

== Habitat and biology ==
The orangeface angelfish has been recorded at depths of 20 to 25 metres (66 to 82 ft) in the Java Sea. However, the biology of this species is very poorly known, it is thought that it is likely to live on deep rocky reefs. Its diet consists of sponges and tunicates.

== Systematics ==
The orangeface angelfish was first formally described in 1855 as Holocanthus chrysocephalus by the Dutch ichthyologist, herpetologist and physician Pieter Bleeker (1819-1878) with the type locality given as Jakarta. The specific name is a compound of the Greek chrysos meaning "gold" and cephalus meaning "head", a reference to the yellowish-orange head colour.

== Utilisation ==
The orangeface angelfish occurs extremely infrequently in the aquarium trade.
