= Francis Houssemayne du Boulay =

Australian musician and naturalist

Francis Houssemayne "Frank" du Boulay (24 January 1837 – 12 January 1914) was an Australian musician and naturalist.

== History ==
Du Boulay was born in Sandgate, Kent, England, the third son of Rev Thomas Houssemayne du Boulay. (14 February 1804 – 14 June 1872).

He left for Western Australia around 1858, and settled at Minnanooka station, Champion Bay, near Geraldton, with his brother Arthur Houssemagne du Boulay, who married Caroline Emily Josephine Howard in 1867.

He began collecting insects there, also in Victoria around 1869; Cooktown and Rockhampton around 1870, and in northern New South Wales and Sydney.

Du Boulay was a talented pianist and concertina player, and was prominent at concerts in Melbourne, 1872–1876 including Robert Sparrow Smythe's Exhibition Concert Company, with singers Mrs Smythe (Amelia Elizabeth Bailey, soprano), Samuel Lamble (basso), and Mary Ellen Christian (contralto). His interest in bugs and beetles never waned; he was a member of the Field Naturalists' Club of Victoria.

He moved to Beechworth, Victoria, around 1888, and soon was immersed in the music scene; he helped organise a concert in aid of the public library and Burke Museum, contributing a fantasia on themes from Faust played on a symphonion. He was also a skilled player on the xylophone and "carillon" (tubular bells).

Around 1904 he left Beechworth for Beverley, Western Australia, where he taught music for many years, and died on 12 January 1914.

== Recognition ==
His collection of paintings of Coleoptera in two volumes, is held by the National Museum, Melbourne.

The species Chaetodontoplus duboulayi and Melanotaenia duboulayi were named for him, though both are fishes.

== Family ==
Du Boulay married Mary Jane Lawrance (c. 1850 – 13 September 1940). on 25 May 1879 They had two sons and four daughters, listed as Edgar, William, Amy, Leila, Margaret and Isabel:

- Edgar (born 6 November 1880) married Marjorie Preston on 23 April 1918.
- William Lawrance (frequently reported as Lawrence) du Boulay (17 March 1882 – 28 July 1955) was a fine violinist. He never married.
- daughter 9 July 1883
- daughter 3 June 1886
- daughter 18 August 1891

Two daughters had notable marriages:

- Margaret "Madge" du Boulay married Edward Tours Hamersley (born 1869), son of Edward Hamersley, junior at Nice, France on 27 May 1930. She was an accomplished violinist.
- Isabel du Boulay married Sir Edward Wittenoom on 22 December 1924.
