= Cranwell, Brauncewell and Byard's Leap =

Civil parish in Lincolnshire, England

Coordinates: 53.0367°N 0.4619°W

- Civil parish
- Byard's Leap St Andrew's Church, Cranwell All Saints Church, Brauncewell

- Location within Lincolnshire
- Interactive map of Cranwell, Brauncewell and Byard's Leap
- Population: 2,968 (2021)
- OS grid reference: TF034502
  - London: 105 mi (169 km) S
- District: North Kesteven
- Shire county: Lincolnshire
- Region: East Midlands
- Country: England
- Sovereign state: United Kingdom
- Settlements: Cranwell; Brauncewell; Byard's Leap
- Post town: SLEAFORD
- Postcode district: NG34
- Dialling code: 01400
- Police: Lincolnshire
- Fire: Lincolnshire
- Ambulance: East Midlands
- UK Parliament: Sleaford and North Hykeham
- Website: cranwell.parish.lincolnshire.gov.uk

Cranwell, Brauncewell and Byard's Leap is a civil parish in the North Kesteven district of Lincolnshire, England. It lies approximately 3 miles (4.8 km) north-west of Sleaford and 14 miles (23 km) south-east of Lincoln. The parish comprises the village of Cranwell, the hamlet of Brauncewell and the historic site of Byard's Leap. At the 2021 census it had a population of 2,968.

== Geography ==
The parish occupies gently undulating farmland on the limestone edge of the Lincolnshire Heath, with the village of Cranwell centred on the B1429 road. RAF Cranwell dominates the western part of the parish. The A15 (between Sleaford and Newark-on-Trent) forms part of the eastern boundary area, while the A17 from Sleaford to Lincoln and the B6403 from Ancaster both briefly enter the lower southwest of the parish. The highest point is around 77 metres (253 ft) to the south of Byard's Leap.

== History ==
Prehistoric and Roman activity have been recorded in the vicinity, including the line of the Roman road continuing Mareham Lane north of Sleaford, largely followed by the present A15, which runs through the eastern part of the parish. Ermine Street, another such road forms the modern B6403 road to Byard's Leap and the lower western edge of the parish.

Cranwell is recorded in the Domesday Book of 1086 as Craneuuelle (or similar forms), a settlement in the hundred of Flaxwell with 35 households, land held by Gilbert of Ghent. Brauncewell is also recorded in Domesday as a manor. Byard's Leap originated as an extra-parochial area associated with the Knights Templar and later became a civil parish before merging with Cranwell.

Significant archaeological remains include the scheduled medieval village earthworks of Brauncewell, a well-preserved deserted medieval settlement with house platforms and streets that prospered in the 12th–13th centuries before declining after the mid-14th century. A second deserted medieval village, Dunsby, also lies within the parish.

Historically it lay in the Flaxwell wapentake in the Parts of Kesteven. The modern civil parish was formed by successive amalgamations: Byard's Leap with Cranwell in 1931, and Brauncewell in 2011, creating the present name “Cranwell, Brauncewell and Byard's Leap”.

== Governance ==
The parish is administered by Cranwell, Brauncewell and Byard's Leap Parish Council. It forms part of the Cranwell, Leasingham & Wilsford electoral ward and the Sleaford and North Hykeham parliamentary constituency.

== Demographics ==
The 2021 census recorded a population of 2,968. Earlier figures were approximately 2,876 (2001) and 2,827 (2011). The presence of RAF Cranwell significantly influences the demographic profile, with a relatively high proportion of working-age residents.

== Economy ==
Agriculture remains important on the surrounding farmland. The dominant employer is RAF Cranwell and the associated Royal Air Force College. Limited local businesses serve the village and station community; residents also travel to Sleaford for wider services and shopping.

== Community ==
Community facilities include the parish churches, village hall and services associated with RAF Cranwell. Primary education is provided locally, with secondary education in Sleaford. The parish council maintains local amenities and organises community activities.

== Landmarks ==
Notable listed buildings and scheduled monuments include:

- Church of St Andrew, Cranwell (Grade I) – medieval parish church with Norman, Early English and Perpendicular features, incorporating earlier fabric and a rare hogsback grave cover.
- Church of All Saints, Brauncewell (Grade II) – redundant church, largely rebuilt in the 19th century over earlier fabric, containing a 10th–12th-century grave cover and 16th-century font.
- Cranwell village cross is a scheduled monument and Grade II – this is a 14th-century buttercross restored in the early 20th century, standing in the village centre.
- Brauncewell medieval village is a scheduled monument with extensive earthworks of the deserted settlement.
- College Hall, RAF Cranwell (Grade II*) and associated inter-war buildings including Building 16 (IOT Headquarters, Grade II), Station Headquarters and gates/lodges.
- Other Grade II listed structures include Hall Farmhouse, Brauncewell Lodge, and groups of cottages on North Road.

== Transport ==
The parish is served by the B1429 (linking the A15 and A17) and minor roads. There is no operational railway station; the nearest stations are at Sleaford. Limited bus services connect to Sleaford and Lincoln.

=== RAF Cranwell ===
RAF Cranwell is a major Royal Air Force station and the home of the Royal Air Force College, which trains officers for the RAF. The station was established during the First World War and the College Hall (Grade II*) and other inter-war buildings form an important architectural group within the parish.

== Education ==
Cranwell Primary School is within the village.

== Religious sites ==
Church of St Andrew is at Cranwell, while the Church of All Saints is at Brauncewell.

== Sport ==
The parish contains a playing field north of the air base. The local social club supports pool and darts teams which play in local leagues, there is also a golf society.

== Notable people ==
- Haskett Smith (1847 – 1906), rector at Brauncewell
- James Aubrey (1947 – 2010), actor
- Sheila Cassidy (1937 – ), doctor
