= Haskett Smith (preacher) =

Rev. Haskett Smith, MA FRGS (16 July 1847 – 12 January 1906) was an English missionary in Egypt who resided for many years on Mount Carmel, subsequently travelled the world preaching and lecturing on the Holy Land and other esoteric subjects. He was popular, touring Australia and New Zealand under management by R. S. Smythe. (Note: He has been confused with the legally-trained mountain climber Walter Parry Haskett Smith.)

== History ==
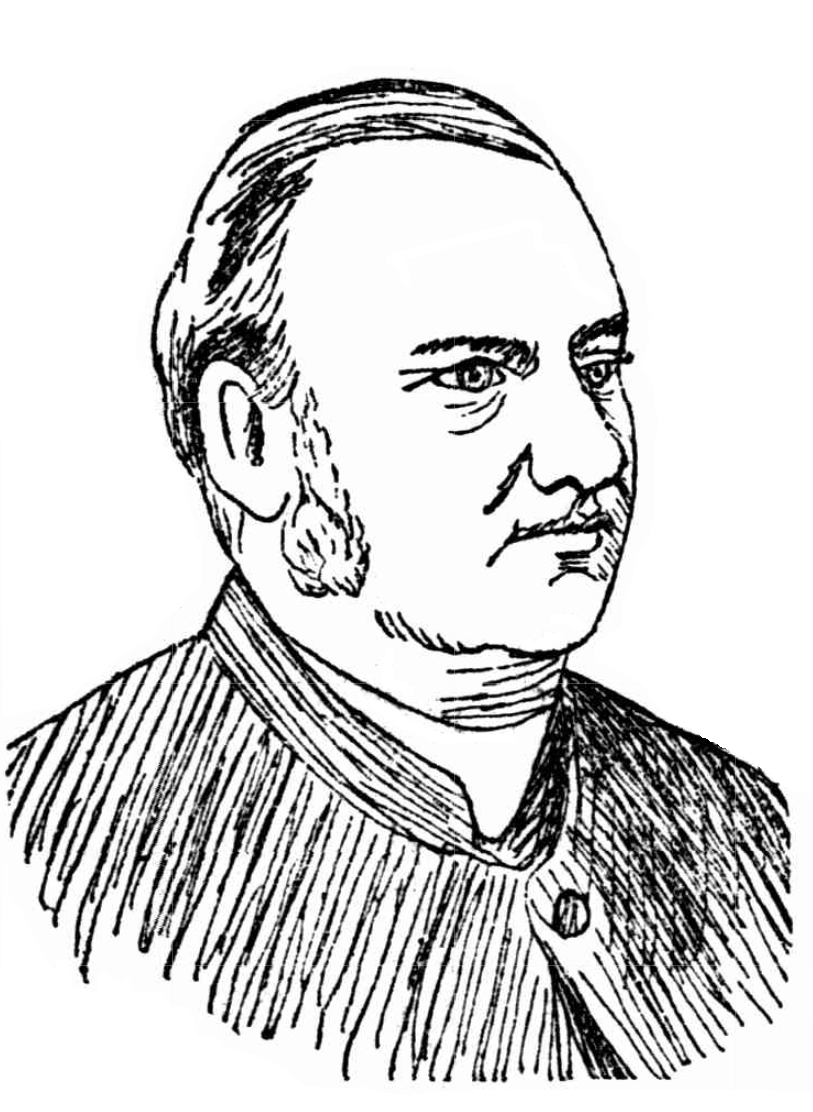
Rev. Haskett Smith

Smith was a high wrangler at Christ's College, Cambridge and became rector of Brauncewell-cum-Anwick, Lincolnshire 1875–1899.

In 1882 he became an acolyte of Laurence Oliphant, who was working, and expending his considerable fortune, on establishing a Jewish settlement at Mount Carmel in Palestine. Oliphant died in 1883 and Smith continued his work.

Lectures by world travelling authors became popular in the late 1800s, and the impresario Smythe was quick to cash in. Dr Talmage's triumphant tour of New Zealand and Australia led other peripatetic clergymen to look on the colonies as a fruitful field of endeavour: S. Reynolds Hole was followed by the popular H. R. Haweis, and finally Smith, whose knowledge of the Biblical land and photographs of Palestine and Egypt were legendary. There was a huge public appetite for occult knowledge associated with their histories.

Smith was once at a dinner with Mark Twain, and took the famous author to task for his description of Straight Street in Damascus as being "more straight than a corkscrew but less straight than a rainbow". Smith had photographed the street, and asserted that it was about as straight as geographically possible. The other guests had a laugh at the humorist's expense. "What had you been drinking?" enquired Twain; "Water, only water" replied Smith. "Ah well," drawled Twain "you see — that makes all the difference".

He arrived in Australia by the steamer Ville de la Ciotat in May 1895 but remained "under wraps" until the conclusion of Haweis's tour under the same management, then toured continuously for six months, establishing some kind of record.

Smythe's next prodigy was Frederic Villiers, a war correspondent with the Japanese forces in China. But his greatest success was Rev. Charles Clark of Bristol, who toured Australia for Smythe in 1874–1878 and 1896.

Smith returned to Australia in 1900 for a tour which included Western Australia for the first time, lecturing on, amongst other subjects, the Paris Exhibition of 1899.

He died suddenly at his home in Churley Wood, Hertfordshire. Active to the last, barely two days earlier he delivered one of his "lucid and informative" lectures on Damascus at the Bishopsgate Institute.

== Publications ==
- The Divine Epiphany: In Ten Progressive Scenes (1879)
- For God and Humanity (3 volumes, 1891)
- The Lord's Prayer: A Series of Short Meditative Addresses
- Patrollers of Palestine (1906)

Smith was editor of several Murray's Handbooks for Travellers that dealt with Egypt and Palestine.
