= Mary Ellen Christian =

Canadian-born contralto (1848–1941)

Mary Ellen Christian (1848 – 31 May 1941) was a Canadian-born contralto, best known as a teacher of singing in Australia, founder of the Garcia school of singing at Potts Point, a suburb of Sydney.

== History ==
Christian was born in Quebec, of English parents, (Note: Her mother, Elizabeth Christian, was born around 1855 and died 12 June 1918.) who returned to London three years later. She joined the choir of the Woolwich Dockyard Anglican church, and took singing lessons from a Miss Whomes, daughter of the church organist, who prepared her for entry to the (London) Royal Academy of Music, where she studied music and singing under Manuel Garcia, and she won the Westmorland Scholarship and the Cipriani Potter Exhibition. Her rich contralto voice (D in bass to B in alt) was praised in The Times. Jenny Lind and her husband Otto Goldschmidt were among her admirers.

Following a concert at St James's Hall, London, she lost her voice due to congestion of the lungs, and on medical advice she left for Australia in 1871, settling in Melbourne. She made her tentative debut at a grand benefit concert for Saurin Lyster at the Melbourne Town Hall on 26 August 1871.

She joined the Melbourne Philharmonic Society in 1872, and was a principal vocalist in the Society's 138th concert, presenting Mendelssohn's St Paul at the Town Hall on 10 December 1872. Those two performed together again, in the Intercolonial Music Festival or Exhibition of 1872–73 and in Robert Sparrow Smythe's "Exhibition Concert Company" whose members included Mrs Smythe, Miss Christian, Samuel Lamble (basso), F. H. Du Boulay (concertina) and C. Huenerbein (piano)

Christian toured with the petite violinist Jenny Claus in 1872, and with Arabella Goddard in 1873. Then, contracted to Robert Sparrow Smythe, she sang in various quartets, generally with the tenor Armes Beaumont, either Rosina Palmer or Frances Saville for soprano, and one or other of various baritones or basses. In 1874 at Manly Beach, New South Wales, she gave birth to Smythe's son Robert Christian Holmes Smythe. Perhaps Christian hoped he would marry her, but Smythe, who may have been already married, and had three children by "Mrs Smythe" (soprano Amelia Elizabeth Bailey (1843–1932)), eventually had an Australian marriage with Bailey in 1881. Robert Christian Holmes Smythe died on 15 December 1900 of wounds received in the Second Boer War.

In December 1876 she was appointed teacher at the Presbyterian Ladies' College in East Melbourne, and it was in this period that she was, famously, Helen Mitchell (Nellie Melba)'s singing teacher. (Note: Mitchell became Mrs Armstrong in Brisbane in December 1882. Christian claims not to have been in Australia at the time, but in that she was mistaken.) In 1879 she made a return visit to London, where she was welcomed, and despite intentions of a relaxing holiday, fell into the cycle of concerts and private engagements. She was however forced to cut it short by a recurrence of her old breathing problems, and returned to Melbourne by the RMS Orient in May 1880. Through the round of private parties in London she had entré to Melbourne social circles, including those of the Marquess of Normanby (Governor of Victoria from 1879 to 1884), a boost to her list of private students. She appears not to have resumed teaching duties at the Presbyterian Ladies' College, but was associated with Oberwyl Ladies' College, St Kilda, 1885–1887, and Tintern Ladies' College, Hawthorn, 1890–1892.

In December 1884, her sister Emily Christian (–) arrived from Stuttgart, where she had been studying piano. In February 1889 Madame Christian, with her sister as accompanist, sang at Madeline Schiller's farewell concert at the Town Hall. Christian had sung at Schiller's earlier visit to Australia.

She toured with Charles Santley 1889–1890, notably at the opening of the Sydney Town Hall, supported by the orchestra of Roberto Hazon.

Around 1890 she joined the Catholic church, of which Santley was an adherent, and after some years of poor health and financial difficulties, announced her retirement. After a farewell concert at the Melbourne Town Hall, she left for Sydney and joined the staff of St Vincent's College, Potts Point, controlled by the Sisters of Charity. She joined the Order, taking the name Sister Mary Paul of the Cross, and in 1905 she founded the Garcia School of Music, named for her old teacher, in Challis Avenue, next to St Vincent's Convent.

== Students ==
Singers known to have received training from Christian include Kathleen Bourke, Molly de Gunst, Gertrude Concannon, Ella Caspers, Kate Rooney, Carrie Lanceley, (Note: Lanceley (died 2 May 1969) was a daughter of Edward Robert Lanceley (c. 1848–1928) of 10 Bellevue Avenue, Greenwich, New South Wales, prosperous owner of the North Sydney Brick and Tile Company. A fine singer with a beautiful voice, she had some success in the South Street Musical Competitions in 1901, gained a popular following and was championed by the Sydney Star. She left for London in April 1907 studied under Charles Santley and made numerous public appearances in London, including recruitment drives during the Great War. She returned to Australia in 1916, accompanied by her parents, later founded a high-class vaudeville act, the "Melody Maids". She remained a popular concert performer and in her later years hosted concerts at the family home, for Red Cross and other causes.) Zillah Harrison, and Eugene Boland and, notably, Helen Mitchell (better known as Nellie Melba).
