= Robert Sparrow Smythe =

Australian theatrical manager

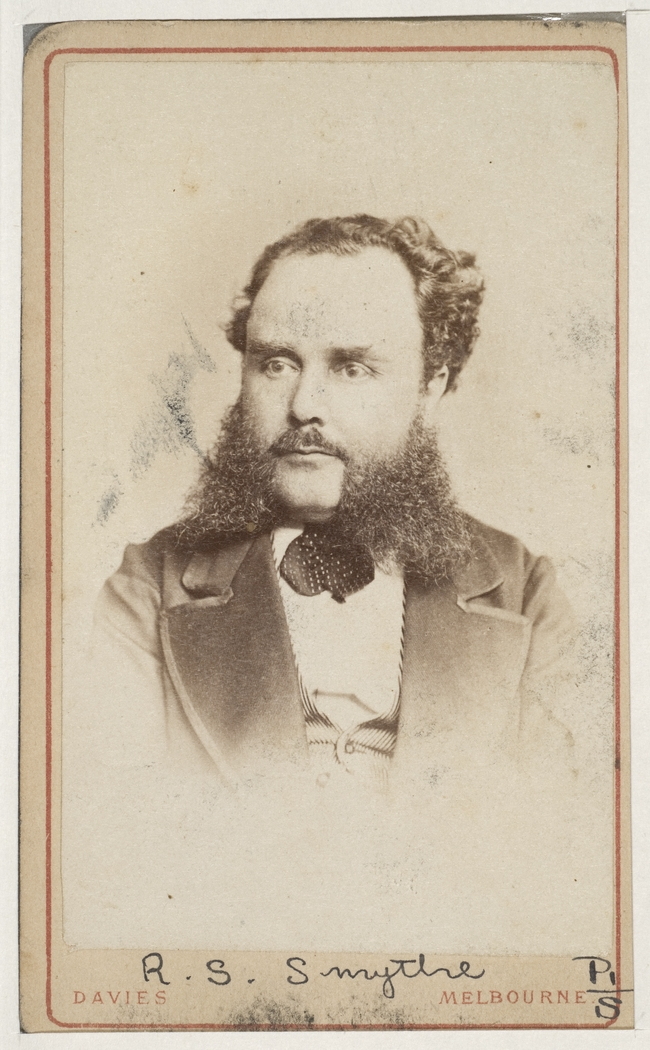
Robert Sparrow Smythe, traveller, concert manager and orator, ca. 1875

Robert Sparrow Smythe (13 March 1833 – 23 May 1917) was an Australian journalist, newspaper editor/owner and theatrical manager.

== Biography ==
=== Early life and education ===
Smythe was born as Robert Smith on 13 March 1833 at 124 Regent Street (ex Gray's Walk, now gone) Lambeth, London, son of the unmarried Elizabeth Bridge and "Edward Smith", or "Edward Sparrow", whose occupation is variously given as commercial traveller or draper. Elizabeth Bridge herself disclosed to her children that their father was "already married with a family". Smythe's father, whomever he was, died in a carriage accident and the deceased's family cut off support, leaving the "Smiths" destitute. Smythe attended the British School in George Street, Lambeth under John Horrocks, and continued his association with Horrocks and fellow students after he left to start his apprenticeship at 23 Great New Street, Fetter Lane, alongside friend Frederick Greenwood.

=== Early career ===
He emigrated to Melbourne in 1855 aboard the Kent and headed to Adelaide, where he became the parliamentary reporter on the South Australian Register. In 1858–59 he became the highest paid editor of a country newspaper in Australia by heading up the Pastoral Times in Deniliquin. After this very short editorship, Smythe travelled overland to Melbourne to establish his own short lived newspaper The St. Kilda Chronicle with printer Albert Richard Goulding. He also worked during this period at the Argus, where he obtained the editorship of Australia's first illustrated journal – the Illustrated Melbourne Post, which developed into the Illustrated Australian News.

He started his career in theatrical management when he piloted the opera-singers Eugenio Bianchi and wife Giovanna di Casali da Campagna, around South Australia in early 1861. When the French violinist Horace Poussard and cellist René Douay arrived in Melbourne he featured them on the cover of the Illustrated Melbourne Post and through their concert party (which included Edward Armes Beaumont), met the local soprano, and his future 'wife', Amelia Elizabeth Bailey. In 1862 he was engaged as agent for Poussard, Douay and Bailey, whom he then piloted around South Australia before the party broke up under legal action centring on a contract dispute between Poussard and Smythe. By this time he had resigned from his editorship and formed a new concert company consisting of pianist, James Marquis Chisholm, Scots elocutionist, Margaret Edith Aitken and Miss Bailey. The tour took in New South Wales, Victoria and Tasmania.

=== 1863–69: The great tour ===
In 1863 the magician John Wesley Simmons (1836–1899), billed as 'Dr. Lynn' or 'H. S. (Hugh Simmons) Lynn', arrived in Melbourne, and Smythe put together yet another party. The contract was to tour the East commencing at Shanghai with Simmons, Italian violinist Agostino Robbio, French pianist Edouard Desireé Boulanger, James Marquis Chisholm and Miss Bailey. This ambitious tour failed to start as planned as the party broke up: Boulanger died of yellow fever in Shanghai, Simmons left after an argument with Smythe "over a woman" in Japan, Robbio left to follow his own travels, and Chisholm decided to stay in the East for a while. Only Smythe and Bailey reached Hong Kong in 1864, having been as far east as Yokohama. They wrote to Poussard and Douay in Melbourne, requesting their assistance in forming another company. Poussard sailed to Ceylon to meet them with his own 'wife', contralto and serio-comic vocalist Florence Calzado but Douay had suffered a breakdown and been returned to France.

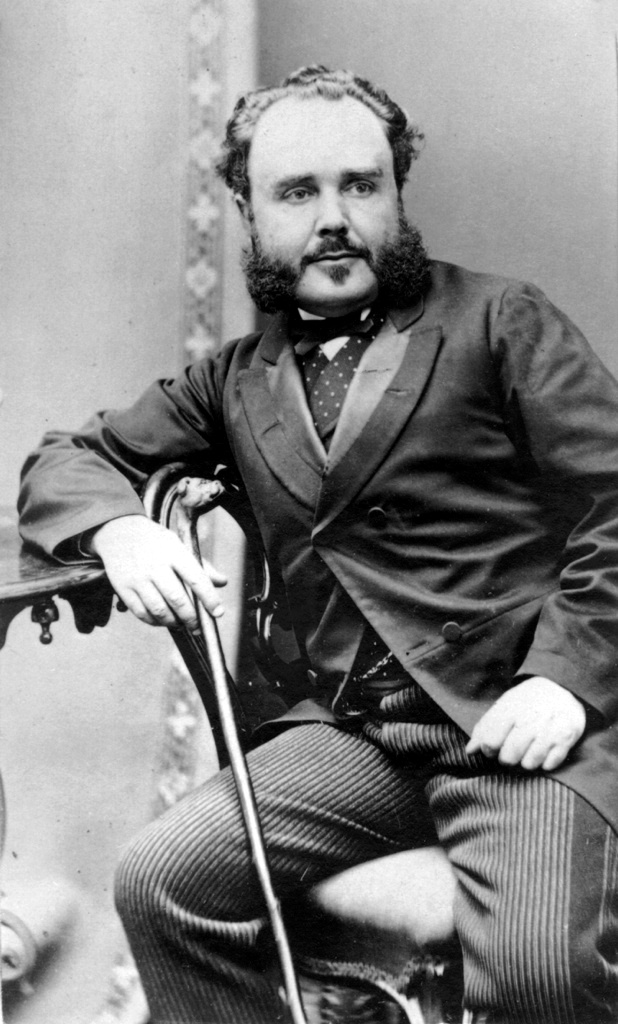
an Australian journalist, newspaper editor/owner and theatrical manager.

The new group toured India from 1864 until late 1866, taking a route that included Ceylon, Bombay, Delhi, Simla, Agra, Udaipur, Umballa, Pondicherry, Madras, and all major towns that held British populations or garrisons, even going as far as Peshawur. In 1867 they arrived at the Cape from Mauritius with the intent of merely stopping over on their way to England. They stayed in South Africa for two years against all advice, crossing the Vaal river and giving concerts in the Transvaal – the first concert company to do so. In October 1868 Smythe and Poussard left for England just after their 150th concert and 'the Ladies' stayed at the Cape until June 1869 when they engaged to sail directly back to Melbourne. During this "Great Tour" Amelia Bailey gave birth to three children: Bryan Bailey Smythe (c. 1864 – c. 1867), Carlyle Greenwood Smythe (1865 Umballa, India – 1926 Nice, France) and Florence Nightingale Smythe (1867 Nuwara Eliya, Ceylon – 1948, Kew, Melbourne). There are reports that Smythe married Bailey in Nagasaki, Japan, in 1863. Be that as it may, Smythe and Bailey had an Australian wedding in 1881.

=== 1870–79: Musical concert companies ===
Smythe returned to England, only to find journalistic work difficult to obtain, and was practically broke. He managed to contribute to the Cornhill Magazine and the Pall Mall Gazette, both times through the assistance of Frederick Greenwood. This was enough to furnish the fare back to Australia in 1869 with Daniel E. Bandmann, the tragedian, for whom he acted as pilot. In 1870 he managed Robert Heller the magician, following in 1871 with the New Zealand colonist and drawing room impersonator, George Cotterell. 1871 also saw the birth of his last marital child – Amelia Adelaide Smythe at St Kilda. Later that year he undertook to manage the struggling Zavistowski Sisters (Christine, Emmeline and Alice), an American burlesque trio imported by George Coppin. In 1872 he was appointed director of the concerts given in Melbourne in connection with the Victorian International Exhibition. Following that success he formed the "Exhibition Concert Company" and toured in the first half of 1873.

In 1873, newly arrived pianist Arabella Goddard found navigating the press difficult and engaged Smythe later that year. Smythe managed her letters to the press and rearranged public perception. 1874 saw the tour of the Arabella Goddard Company extend to India and eventually, New Zealand. Goddard's inability to cope with the tropics led to many cancelled concerts in India, and forced Smythe to return to Australia to form once again, the Exhibition Concert Company now consisting of Miss Mary Ellen Christian, a gifted contralto, who trained in the Royal Academy of Music, London (and whose interests he never ceased to promote for eighteen years), Solange Navarro and Edward Farley. Goddard and Mrs R. S. Smythe remained, touring India, Java and Singapore, returning to Sydney in September 1874. While in Sydney, Smythe added tenor Edward Armes Beaumont, basso Agostino Giuliano Susini and the American contralto Cassie Everett Dyer (Mrs A. H. Cutter) to Goddard's company. 1874 was also the year that Mary Ellen Christian gave birth to a son by Smythe, Robert Christian Holmes Smythe (1874 Manly Beach, New South Wales – 1900 Thaba-Nchu, South Africa). A Mr Holmes had been performing in a musical company with Mary Ellen Christian, and the New Zealand press referred to her as "Mrs Holmes", when Smythe was clearly the father.

In 1875, he introduced the Rev. Charles Clark, the former minister of Broadmead Chapel at Bristol, as a popular lecturer in Australia. Clark formed the nucleus of a combined platform speaking and concert company for the remainder of years that Smythe was associated with him. In late 1876 Smythe took Rev. Clark to the United States and Canada. Clark managed well on his own, Smythe having gone ahead to arrange bookings, ticket takers, puff pieces, broadsides, transport and other details. Upon Smythe's return to Australia in 1877 he piloted the cornetist Jules Levy through New South Wales, Victoria, Tasmania, South Australia and New Zealand. He finished the decade with Rev. Charles Clark and returned to England with his family. Having travelled with Clark for more than five years in Australia, America, and Africa, Smythe saw that the lecture-platform was a popular institution at the Antipodes, and his ambition since 1879, when he again visited the old country, has been to "run" celebrities.

=== 1880–89: Platform speakers ===
Carlotta Patti toured in the beginning of 1880 under Smythe, and during that year Smythe's preference turned from substantial musical companies to more serious platform speakers such as the "lamented Richard Anthony Proctor astronomer", then war correspondent Archibald Forbes in 1882 (with whom he first met Mark Twain while in America). Moncure Daniel Conway followed in 1883, then George Augustus Sala, who had earlier written to Smythe after hearing how much money Forbes had cleared during his tour. Smythe informed Sala that he would have to hear him first and Sala responded by telling Smythe to "...go to the lower levels of Tartarus!." A local consortium then engaged Sala, brought him to Australia, and upon finding him difficult to manage, asked Smythe to take him off their hands. From 1885 until 1886 Smythe gladly contracted with Sala and earned them both a handsome profit.

In 1887, besides the ongoing association with Rev. Clark, Smythe piloted Locke Richardson the Shakespearian scholar, Smythe's old associate Dr. H. S. Lynn, and undertook to manage Williamson, Garner and Musgrove's Opera season in New Zealand. 1888 saw the American Civil War lecturer, Major Henry Craige Dane, and the larger than life speaker on the Holy Land, Lydia Von Mamreoff Finklestein, with whom he toured the usual circuits and New Zealand well into 1889.

=== 1890–99: Deep thought and high art ===
The 1890s continued Smythe's association with Rev. Clark, and a re-engagement with musical clients but of a higher order: opera singers Charles Santley and Janet Patey, organist William Thomas Best, Charles Hallé, Wilhelmina Neruda-Norman (Wilma Neruda) and Marion Burton and Horace Poussard all filled the calendars of 1890 and 1891. By this time Smythe was aided by his son Carlyle in the running of what was now the "Smythe Agency." In 1892 Henry Morton Stanley toured, and later Max O'Rell, the French humorist. In 1894 after taking a year off for travel, Smythe toured with the Rev. Thomas De Witt Talmage, the very animated American preacher. The violinist Camilla Urso toured Australia under contract to Smythe, and in 1895 Smythe handle tours of three platform speakers: music historian Rev. Hugh Reginald Haweis, war correspondent Frederic Villiers and Mark Twain, who had accepted Smythe's invitation to tour the world. Twain became the "Lion" of Smythe's career; part of Twain's tour was managed by Smythe's son Carlyle.

In 1896, the raconteur and tour guide of the Holy Land Rev. Haskett Smith was popular, Harry Furniss, the illustrator and lecturer, toured under contract to Smythe in 1897, as in 1898 did Gilbert & Sullivan star Durward Lely.

=== 1900–17: Retirement ===
By the early 1900s Smythe had settled down to managing small local circuits, and visiting England only for family visitations and holidays. The Rev. John Burns, Hetty Holroyd, Banjo Paterson, Bertha Rossow, J. R. Ward, and the Rev. Alwyn Ewan were all celebrities that he brought to the public in Australia from 1900 until 1906. His son Carlyle had suffered an accident in 1899 when cleaning his opera gloves with benzine while smoking, so Smythe through age, and Carlyle through permanent injury brought the activities of the Smythe agency to a dignified halt and by 1906 Robert Sparrow Smythe was unofficially retired. Smythe died at his residence "Highate" in Deepdene, Victoria on 23 May 1917, and was buried with Anglican rites in Box Hill Cemetery.
