= Kate Rooney (singer) =

Australian singer

Kate Rooney (Note: "Kate" could be a contraction of Katharine, Katherine, or even Kathleen. School records have been found for Kate Agnes Rooney and Kate Celia Rooney, either of which could refer to her. Her birth and life after 1930 are yet to be found, also the fate of her two children.) was an Australian contralto who had a promising international career, which she abandoned for a more settled domestic life.

== History ==
Kate Rooney c. 1900

Rooney was born sometime in the 1870s in Dubbo to Mary Ann Rooney, née Bellane (c. 1841 – 14 December 1926) and Patrick T. Rooney (c. 1838 – 18 May 1919), Customs official, proprietor of a cordial factory, and a "silver throated" tenor.

Rooney was educated to 1891 at St Vincent's College, Potts Point, Sydney, and three or four years at the associated Garcia School of Music under Mary Ellen Christian, passing her Royal Academy of Music and Royal College of Music examinations with honours in 1898.

She became a local sensation, appearing with Hugo Alpen, her first music teacher, in concerts, notably of his Patriotic Cantata. With some urging by Lady Chandos Poole, she decided to travel to London for further training, but with no expectation of a prolonged stay.

She was to have left for London by the R.M.S. Omrah on 10 April 1901, having given a series of country concerts in the previous months in aid of her living expenses — in several towns demand was so great that a repeat concert was arranged. Last minute changes meant she boarded Omrah at Adelaide on the 18th. Before settling down to studies with Charles Santley, she paid a visit to Manuel García who, despite his age, was still considered an authority on the human voice. After some hardships, when she discovered how much more money was needed than what she had saved, she achieved some success, singing at some important concerts in Cowes and London's Ranelagh Club, for whom she became a regular attraction as solo vocalist during the "London season".

In 1907 Rooney married William Kirkham, who had an art gallery and antique furniture business in the vicinity of Fifth Avenue, New York. He was, however, an Englishman, son of Austin Kirkham of Clapham Common.

She returned to Australia in July 1909, and embarked on a tour organised by an influential committee, and was well received. She was a practising Roman Catholic, and received ample encouragement from the Catholic press in Australia, without touching on her private life. She was, in turn, generous in her assistance to Catholic causes. While she was away, her husband arranged for the purchase of a London home at St Margaret's-on-Thames. There she was able to assist her friend Eleanor "Ella" Caspers, (Note: Ella Caspers, like Rooney, was an Australian contralto with Irish roots. Born in Albury and educated in Goulburn, she was sent to Mme Christian at the Garcia School of Music. Dubbed the "Golden Voice", with a range from low D to A in alt, she was praised by Dame Clara Butt, Rivers Allpress, Gerald Vollmer, Signor Roberto Hazon, John Lemmone, Madame Dolores and other musicians of the day. She won a two-years' scholarship to the Royal Academy of Music in London, extended to four years. She toured several times with Fritz Kreisler as his only support act. In May 1921 she married Alvin. A. Maloney of Taree and retired from the stage. Her sister Agnes was a fine pianist, and brother Bill was an organist.) who had been duped into "marrying" the bigamist Felix Ogilvie, known as Bradley.

They revisited Australia in 1916–17, staying at her parents' home "Elmshurst", in Charles Street, Enmore, where they celebrated Christmas 1916. She visited old haunts at Dubbo, also giving a concert in aid of the local hospital, where her maternal grandmother was the first matron.

She largely abandoned her singing career, preferring home and the social life of White Plains, New York, to the rigours of touring America, but reportedly, her voice was still good. The Kirkhams left New York for their London home in 1921, but not permanently.

Rooney and her son Billy visited Australia once again, in 1924–1925, arriving in Sydney by the Sonoma on 30 December 1924, staying with her mother at Enmore. On 18 January she visited Lewisham hospital and gave a concert for staff and patients. Later that month she broadcast on three consecutive nights, assigning her fees to the (Sydney) Sacred Heart hospice for the dying. A cabaret in aid of the Lewisham hospital followed on 6 February She appeared at the St Patrick's Day concert at Sydney Town Hall on 17 March, a concert at Marrickville Town Hall on 16 February and the opening of the St Michael's cathedral, Wagga Wagga. Rooney and her son Billy accompanying, as chaperone, the young Queensland singer Gertrude Concannon, left by the RMS Aorangi for Vancouver on 2 July.

== Other interests ==
Rooney was praised as a writer of humorous prose and as a painter, winning a first prize of £250 in a competition sponsored by the Art Gallery, though further details are elusive. (Note: The same source recounts how she helped support herself in London by working for Punch as a writer and illustrator, again unable to corroborate.) During her years of retirement, while the children were young, she studied the techniques of Oriental painting, and produced some credible works in the style.

While living in New York state, her son Billy had his portrait painted by Robert Tolman.

== Family ==
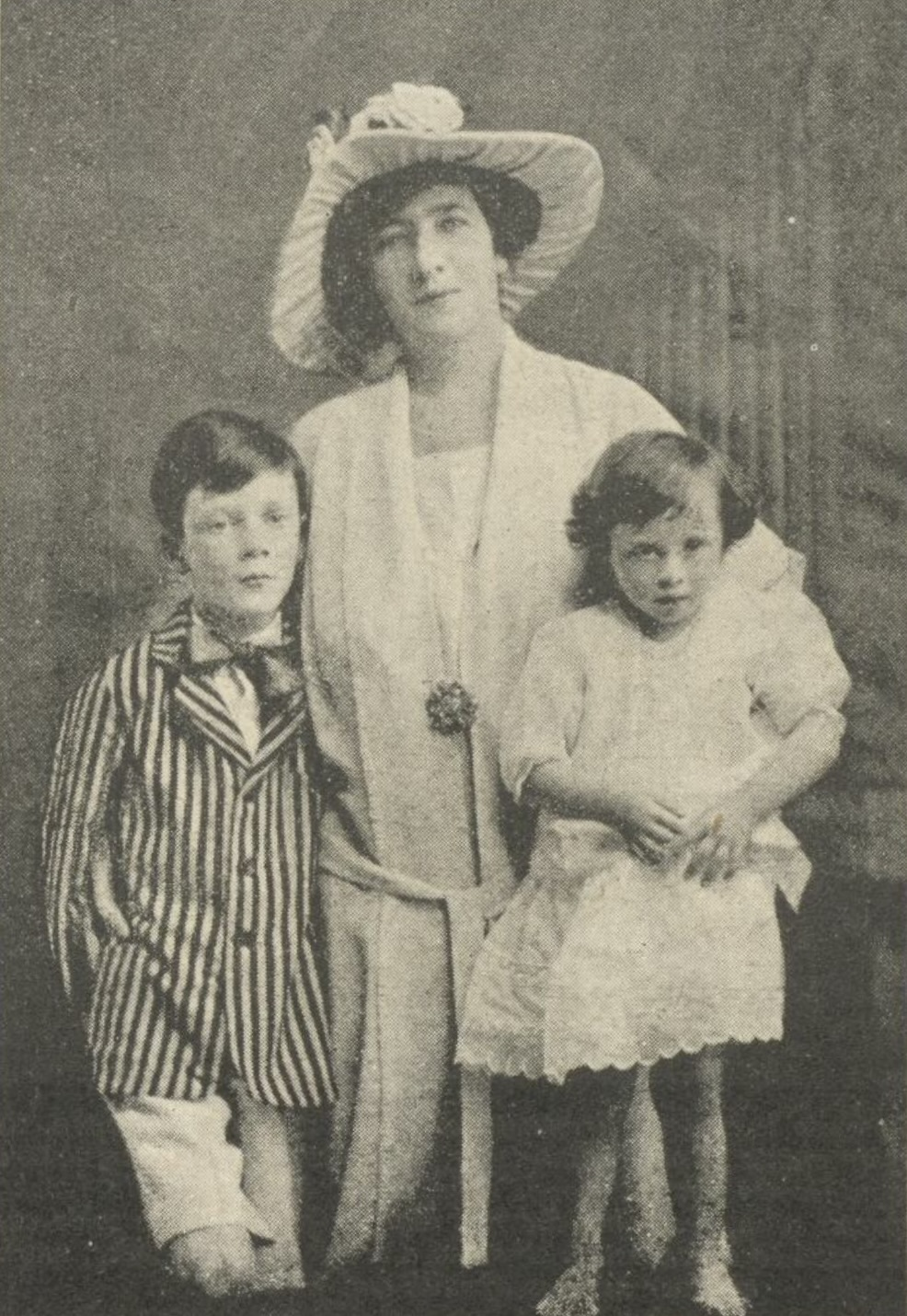
Kate Rooney (Mrs Kirkham) with children Billy and Patsy in 1925

Rooney married art expert William Kirkham at Corpus Christi Church, Brixton, England, on 2 October 1907, and moved to New York. Their first child, a boy, was born on 20 May 1912, but died shortly after. They had two children, William Austin Anthony "Billy" Kirkham (born 26 October 1914) and Patricia "Patsy" Kirkham (born March 1919).

Rooney had a sister, Rea Rooney,

Her brother, Frances Patrick "Frank" Rooney (5 September 1869 – 15 April 1947), public servant of Camp Street, Katoomba, New South Wales. His children include Tom, and Jeanette, who studied under the same Mme Christian as her aunt Kate. Jeanette had a career in Australia as a contralto, singing in J. C. Williamson's Imperial Grand Opera Company, the Sydney Royal Philharmonic Society and regular appearances on ABC radio.
