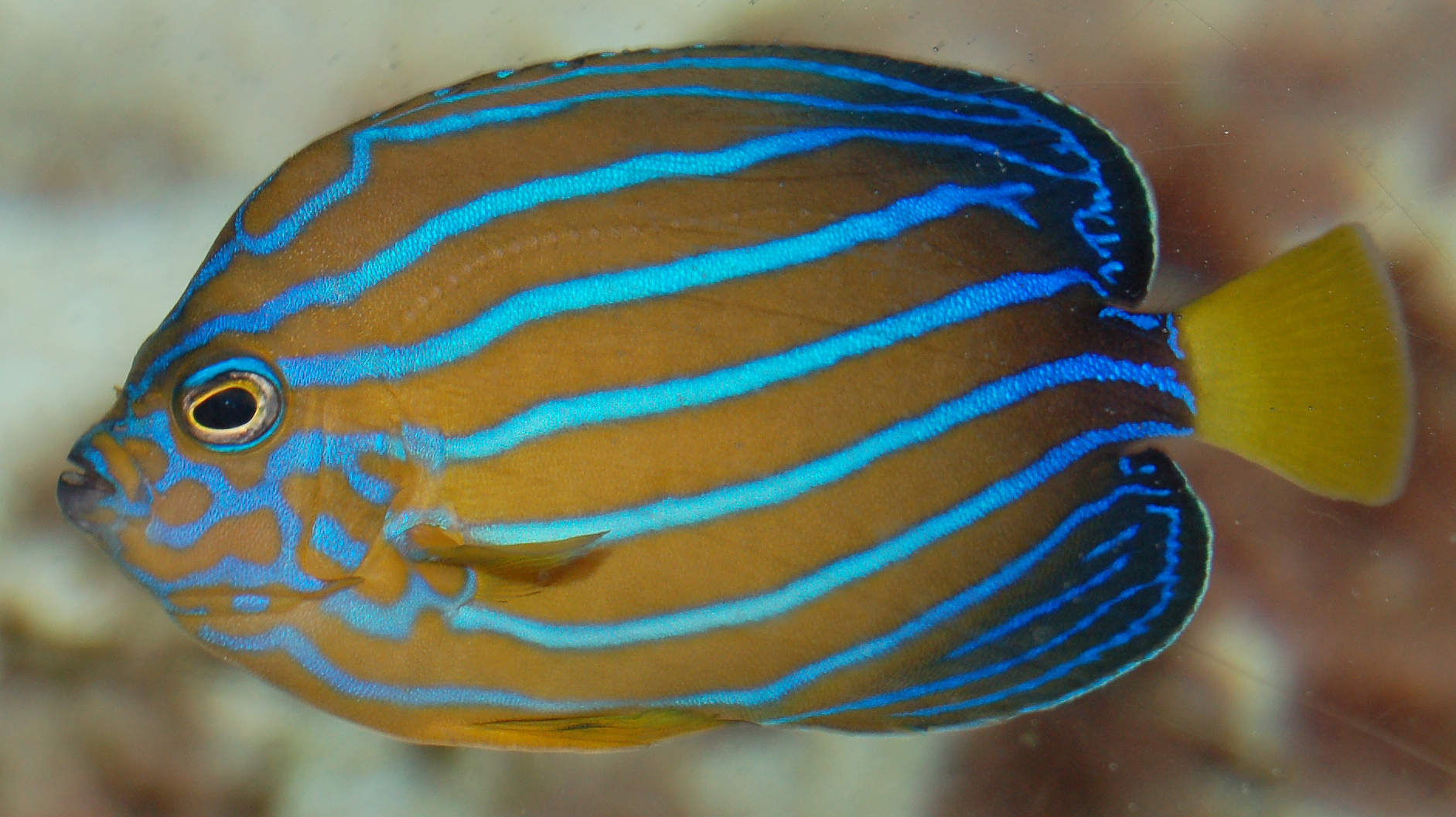
- Bluestriped angelfish Chaetodontoplus septentrionalis

Scientific classification
- Kingdom: Animalia
- Phylum: Chordata
- Class: Actinopterygii
- Division: Teleostei
- Order: Acanthuriformes
- Family: Pomacanthidae
- Genus: Chaetodontoplus; Bleeker, 1876

Type species
- Holacanthus septentrionalis Temminck & Schlegel 1844

Species
- 15, see text.

= Chaetodontoplus =

Genus of fishes

Chaetodontoplus is a genus of marine angelfishes in the family Pomacanthidae. They are found in the Indo-Pacific region.

== Species ==
Image	Scientific name	Common name	Distribution
	Chaetodontoplus ballinae Whitley, 1959.	Ballina angelfish	Southwest Pacific: known only from off Ballina, New South Wales, Australia.
	Chaetodontoplus caeruleopunctatus Yasuda & Tominaga, 1976.	Bluespotted angelfish	Western-Pacific Ocean
	Chaetodontoplus cephalareticulatus S. C. Shen & Lim, 1975	Maze Angelfish	Southern Japan and Taiwan
	Chaetodontoplus chrysocephalus (Bleeker, 1855).	Orangeface angelfish	Western Pacific from Japan to Indonesia
	Chaetodontoplus conspicillatus (Waite, 1900).	Conspicuous angelfish	Australia, New Caledonia
	Chaetodontoplus dimidiatus (Bleeker, 1860).	Velvet angelfish	Western Central Pacific: Indonesia.
	Chaetodontoplus duboulayi (Günther, 1867).	Scribbled angelfish	Indo-West Pacific Ocean
	Chaetodontoplus melanosoma (Bleeker, 1853).	Black-velvet angelfish	Indo-West Pacific: Indo-Malayan region and New Guinea, northward to southern Japan.
	Chaetodontoplus meredithii Kuiter, 1989.	Queensland yellowtail angelfish, False personifer angelfish	Australia
	Chaetodontoplus mesoleucus (Bloch, 1787).	Vermiculated angelfish	Indo-West Pacific: Japan to Indonesia, Sri Lanka and east to Papua New Guinea
	Chaetodontoplus niger Chan, 1966.	Black angelfish	Western Pacific: Japan and the South China Sea.
	Chaetodontoplus personifer (McCulloch, 1914).	True personifer angelfish	Indo-West Pacific: northwest Australia to Taiwan.
	Chaetodontoplus poliourus Randall & Rocha, 2009	Greytail angelfish	Western Pacific: Papua New Guinea, Solomon Islands, Palau and Indonesia
	Chaetodontoplus septentrionalis (Temminck & Schlegel, 1844).	Bluestriped angelfish	coastal waters of China, southern Japan, and southern Korea
	Chaetodontoplus vanderloosi Allen & Steene, 2004	Vanderloos angelfish	Papua New Guinea
