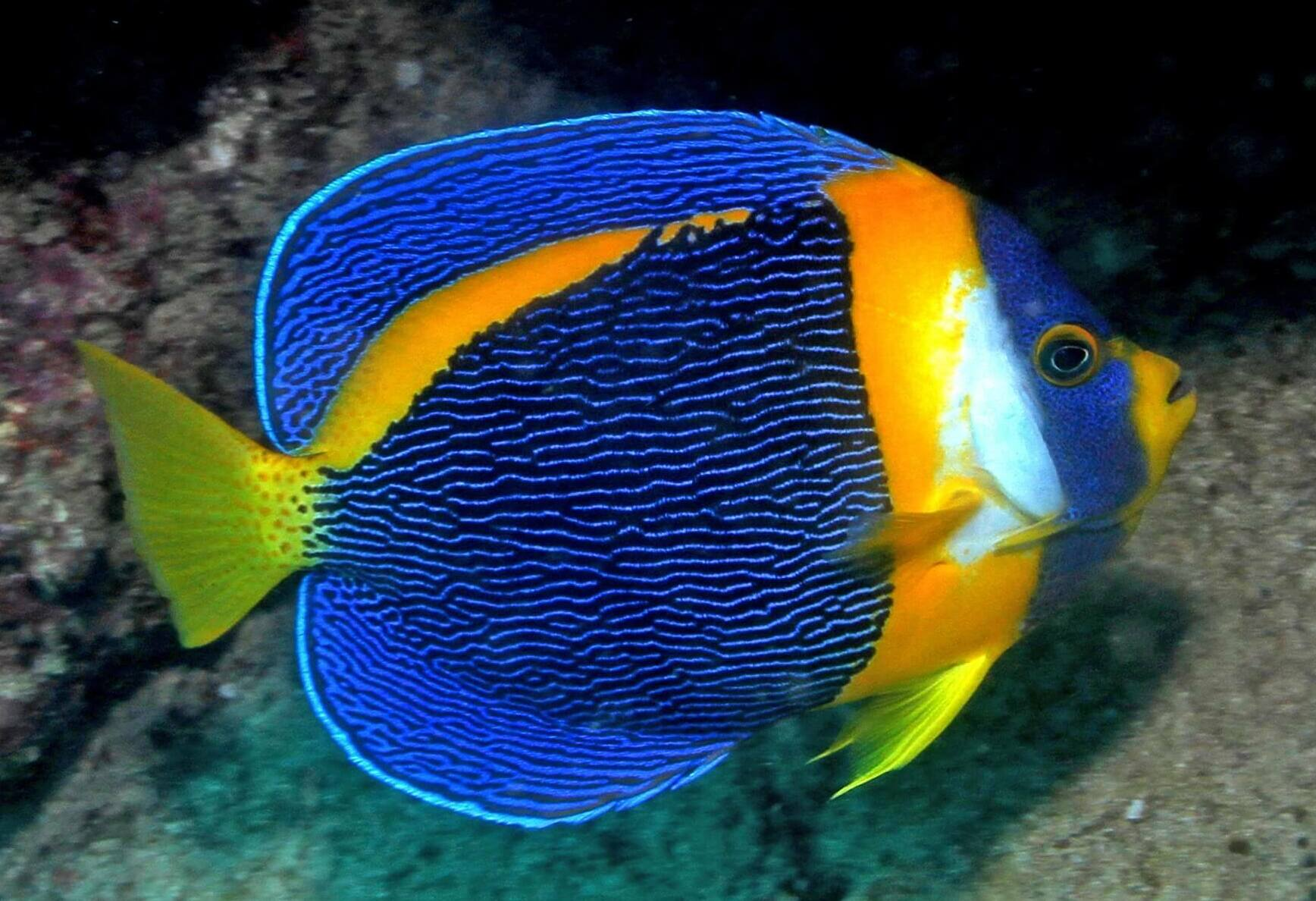
- Male
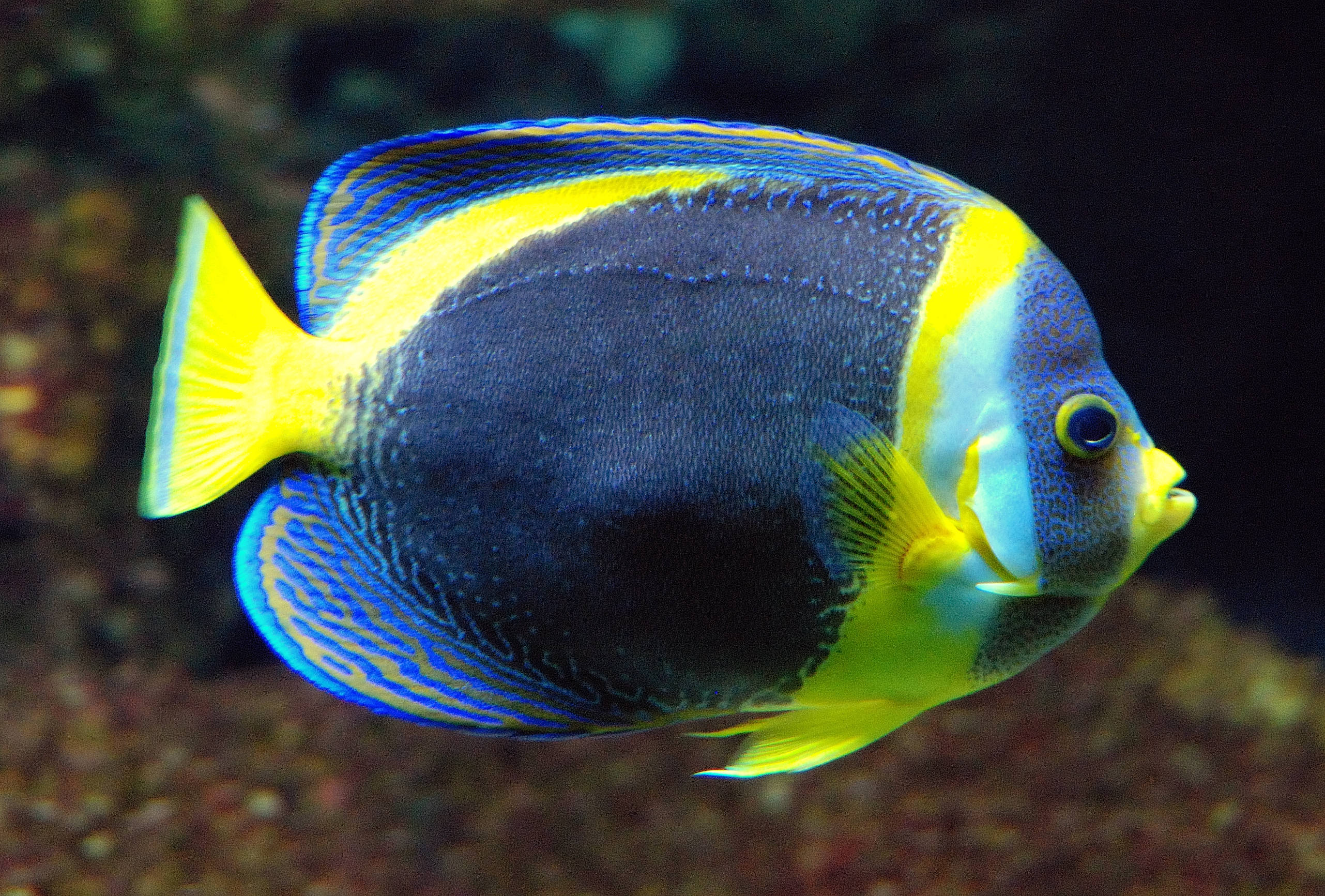
- Female

Conservation status
- Least Concern (IUCN 3.1)

Scientific classification
- Kingdom: Animalia
- Phylum: Chordata
- Class: Actinopterygii
- Order: Acanthuriformes
- Family: Pomacanthidae
- Genus: Chaetodontoplus
- Species: C. duboulayi

Binomial name
- Chaetodontoplus duboulayi (Günther, 1867)

Synonyms
- Holacanthus duboulayi Günther, 1867

= Chaetodontoplus duboulayi =

Species of fish

Chaetodontoplus duboulayi, the scribbled angelfish, is a species of marine ray-finned fish, a marine angelfish belonging to the family Pomacanthidae. This species is from the southwestern Pacific Ocean.

== Description ==
Chaetodontoplus duboulayi has an largely blue body marked with darker wavy lines. The snout is yellow as are the pectoral, pelvic and caudal fins. There is a yellow stripe which extends along the base of the dorsal fin and a wide vertical, yellow bar to the rear of the eye and the operculum is white. They are sexually dimorphic with the males being marked with sinuous blue lines along their flanks while the females have yellow or blue spots. The dorsal fin contains 11 spines and 22 soft rays while the anal fin contains 3 spines and 21 soft rays. This species attains a maximum total length of 28 centimetres (11 in).

== Distribution ==
Chaetodontoplus duboulayi Is found in the southwestern Pacific Ocean where it occurs along the northern Australian coast from Shark Bay in Western Australia to Moreton Bay in Queensland and as far south as Lord Howe Island in the Tasman Sea. It can also be found in the Aru Islands of Indonesia and along the southern coast of New Guinea. There have also been reports from Taiwan.

== Habitat and biology ==
Chaetodontoplus duboulayi at depths between 5 and 20 metres (16 and 66 ft) and is found on coastal and inshore reefs where there are areas of rubble, soft bottoms or open rocky areas which have a substrate made up of outcropping of rock, coral, sponge, and seawhips. They are normally encountered in small groups. They feed on benthic invertebrates especially sponges and tunicates. Like all other angelfish it is a protogynous hermaphrodite, with all individuals being female initially and the dominant ones changing to males.

=== Reproduction ===
In 1993, researchers at the Japanese Journal of Ichthyology began a study regarding the spawning behavior of Scribbled angelfish. It was found that once laid, the eggs of Scribbled angelfish range from 0.92 millimeters to 0.9 millimeters. Additionally, it was found that after spawning the number of eggs created can vary from 5,000 to 33,000.

== Systematics ==
Chaetodontoplus duboulayi was first formally described in 1867 as Holocanthus duboulayi by the German-born British ichthyologist and herpetologist Albert Günther (1830–1914) with the type locality given as the northwestern coast of Australia. The specific name honours the collector of the type, M. Duboulay, this is likely to be the collector, natural historian and entomologist Francis Houssemayne du Boulay (1837–1914). although he specialised in Australian insects and beetles.

== Utilisation ==
Chaetodontoplus duboulayi is a highly prized species in the aquarium trade and formerly was only occasionally exported through that trade. More recently its availability has improved, although specimens still command high prices. They have now been successfully bred in captivity.
