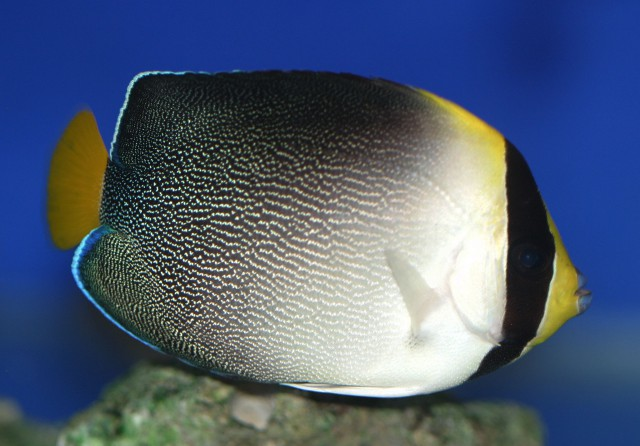

Conservation status
- Least Concern (IUCN 3.1)

Scientific classification
- Kingdom: Animalia
- Phylum: Chordata
- Class: Actinopterygii
- Order: Acanthuriformes
- Family: Pomacanthidae
- Genus: Chaetodontoplus
- Species: C. mesoleucus

Binomial name
- Chaetodontoplus mesoleucus (Bloch, 1787)

Synonyms
- Chaetodon mesoleucus Bloch, 1787

= Chaetodontoplus mesoleucus =

Species of fish

Chaetodontoplus mesoleucus, the vermiculated angelfish, is a species of marine ray-finned fish, a marine angelfish belonging to the family Pomacanthidae. It is found in the Indo-West Pacific region.

== Description ==
Chaetodontoplus mesoleucus has blue lips contrasting with its yellow face. There is a black vertical band which runs through the eye. The body has a cinereous area to the rear of the head this shades into a more sizeable black area, which is marked all over with a pattern of yellow speckling. The caudal fin is yellow and the dorsal and anal fins have a vivid blue margin. The pelvic fins are white. The dorsal fin contains 12 spines and 17-18 soft rays while the anal fin has 3 spines and 17-18 soft rays. This species attains a maximum total length of 18 centimetres (7.1 in).

== Distribution ==
Chaetodontoplus mesoleucus is found in the western Indo-Pacific region. The northernmost part of its range is in southern Japan south through Indonesia west as far as the Mentawai Islands and east to the Bird's Head Peninsula of New Guinea, and south as far northern Australia. Its Australian distribution runs from the reefs off the Kimberley Region of Western Australia south to Varanus Island, as well as the Ashmore Reef in the Timor Sea.

== Habitat and biology ==
Chaetodontoplus mesoleucus is found at depths between 1 and 30 metres (3.3 and 98.4 ft). This species lives in reefs on the continental shelf and is rare around oceanic islands. It prefers areas where there is a rich growth of coral in silty inner coastal reefs and lagoons. Its diet comprises sponges, tunicates, and filamentous algae. It is normally encountered in small groups. When alarmed they hide among the coral. Like all other angelfish it is a protogynous hermaphrodite, with all individuals being female initially and the dominant ones changing to males.

== Systematics ==
Chaetodontoplus mesoleucus was first formally described in 1787 by the German naturalist Marcus Elieser Bloch (1723–1799) with the type locality given as Japan. The specific name is a compound of mesos meaning "middle" and leucus meaning "white" which Bloch did not explain, it may refer to how the white front half of body shades into the black rear half in the middle of the flanks. Chaetodontoplus poliourus was formerly considered to be conspecific with this species but it has yellow margined grey caudal fin, yellow pelvic fins and a paler yellow dorsal fin margin.

== Utlisation ==
Chaetodontoplus mesoleucus is exported for use in aquariums, and is one of the most popular aquarium species.
