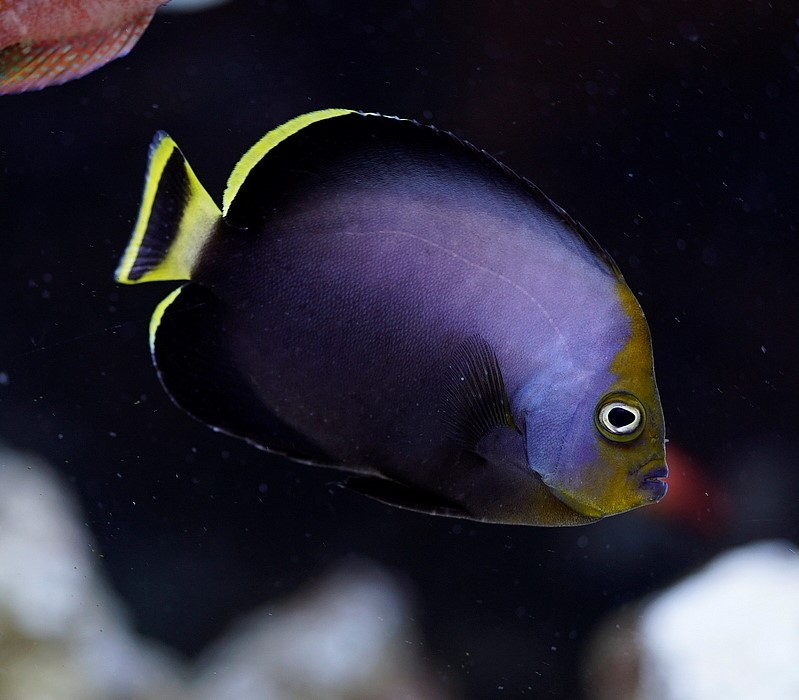

Conservation status
- Least Concern (IUCN 3.1)

Scientific classification
- Kingdom: Animalia
- Phylum: Chordata
- Class: Actinopterygii
- Order: Acanthuriformes
- Family: Pomacanthidae
- Genus: Chaetodontoplus
- Species: C. melanosoma

Binomial name
- Chaetodontoplus melanosoma (Bleeker, 1853)

Synonyms
- Holacanthus melanosoma Bleeker, 1853

= Chaetodontoplus melanosoma =

Species of fish

Chaetodontoplus melanosoma, the black-velvet angelfish, brown angelfish, or phantom angelfish, is a species of marine ray-finned fish, a marine angelfish belonging to the family Pomacanthidae. It is found in the western Pacific Ocean.

== Description ==
Chaetodontoplus melanosoma has a body which has an overall black or brown colouration with an ochre face and yellowish-orange spots across the forehead. The dorsal, anal and caudal fins have yellow margins. The dorsal fin contains 13 spines and 17-19 soft rays while the anal fin contains 3 spines and 17-18 soft rays. This species attains a maximum total length of 20 centimetres (7.9 in).

== Distribution ==
Chaetodontoplus melanosoma is found in the western Pacific Ocean. It lives in central Indonesia around western Java, Bali, Komodo, Flores, Sulawesi, and northeastern Kalimantan. It is also found in Sabah in Malaysia and in the Sulu Archipelago, Cebu, and southern Luzon in the Philippines.

== Habitat and biology ==
Chaetodontoplus melanosoma occurs at depths of approximately 5 to 30 metres in outer rocky or coastal reefs, and is often found in areas with strong currents or upwellings of cooler water. Its eats tunicates and sponges, and may be observed in pairs or alone. C. melanosoma is hermaphroditic.

== Systematics ==
Chaetodontoplus melanosoma was first formally described in 1855 as Holocanthus melanosoma by the Dutch ichthyologist, herpetologist and physician Pieter Bleeker (1819-1878) with the type locality given as Lawajong on Solor in Indonesia. The specific name is a compound of the Greek melanos meaning "black" and soma meaning "body" a reference to the plain black body in adults.

== In the aquarium ==
Chaetodontoplus melanosoma is commonly exported for the aquarium trade. It is best kept at a temperature of 72 to 78 °F (22 to 26 °C), a pH of 8.1-8.4, a hardness of 8-12 dKH and a salinity of 1.020-1.025 sg. These fishes grow to 8 inches (20 cm) inches. They are omnivorous, and will consume aquarium invertebrates such as coral. These fish rarely breed in aquaria.
