= Chaetodontoplus ballinae =

Conservation status
- Least Concern (IUCN 3.1)

Scientific classification
- Kingdom: Animalia
- Phylum: Chordata
- Class: Actinopterygii
- Order: Acanthuriformes
- Family: Pomacanthidae
- Genus: Chaetodontoplus
- Species: C. ballinae

Binomial name
- Chaetodontoplus ballinae Whitley, 1959

Species of fish

Chaetodontoplus ballinae, the Ballina angelfish, is a species of marine ray-finned fish, a marine angelfish, belonging to the family Pomacanthidae. It is endemic to eastern Australia.

== Description ==
Chaetodontoplus ballinae Has a pearly-white body broken by a distinct black band which runs across the back and lower part of the dorsal fin, with the front part reaching down in a bar running over the base of the pectoral fin. The lips are black and there is a vertical dusky bar through the eye. The anal fin, the upper half of dorsal fin and the pelvic fins are white. The eye, front few spines in the dorsal fin, the caudal fin and the pectoral fin are yellow. It attains a maximum length of 20 centimetres (7.9 in).

== Distribution ==
Chaetodontoplus ballinae is endemic to the southwestern Pacific Ocean off the coasts of Eastern Australia. It has been recorded from widely separated localities including Stradbroke Island in southern Queensland, in northern New South Wales at Coffs Harbour, Ballina, Evans Head, North Solitary Island and Seal Rocks. It also occurs around Lord Howe Island in the Tasman Sea.

== Habitat and biology ==
Chaetodontoplus ballinae is found in subtropical areas at depths between 15 and 120 metres (49 and 394 ft). It is found in deep coastal offshore reefs, as well as around sea mounts. They are relatively numerous in the vicinity of Balls Pyramid off Lord Howe Island. Here they may be observed in deeper habitats where there are large boulders, rock piles, peaks, caves and crevices. Ball's Pyramid is almost the only place where the Ballina angelfish has been photographed. Little is known about the biology of the Ballina angelfish, although it has been recorded in pairs or as solitary fishes.

== Systematics ==
Chaetodontoplus ballinae was first formally described in 1959 by the Australian ichthyologist Gilbert Percy Whitley (1903-1975), with the type locality given as off Ballina Bar in New South Wales. The type locality is reflected in the specific name, ballinae. The colour and patterning of the Ballina angelfish are unique within the genus Chaetodontoplus.

== Conservation ==
Chaetodontoplus ballinae has been classified as Least Concern by the IUCN. It does not appear in the aquarium trade as it has full legal protection in Australia. It is subject to some bycatch by fisheries.
