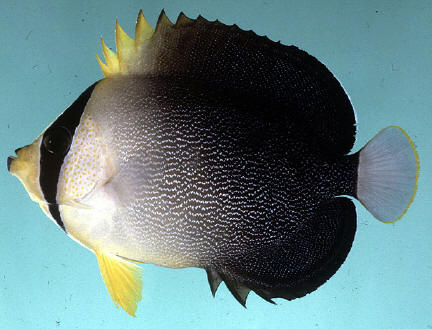

Conservation status
- Least Concern (IUCN 3.1)

Scientific classification
- Domain: Eukaryota
- Kingdom: Animalia
- Phylum: Chordata
- Class: Actinopterygii
- Order: Acanthuriformes
- Family: Pomacanthidae
- Genus: Chaetodontoplus
- Species: C. poliourus

Binomial name
- Chaetodontoplus poliourus Randall & Rocha, 2009

= Chaetodontoplus poliourus =

Species of marine fish

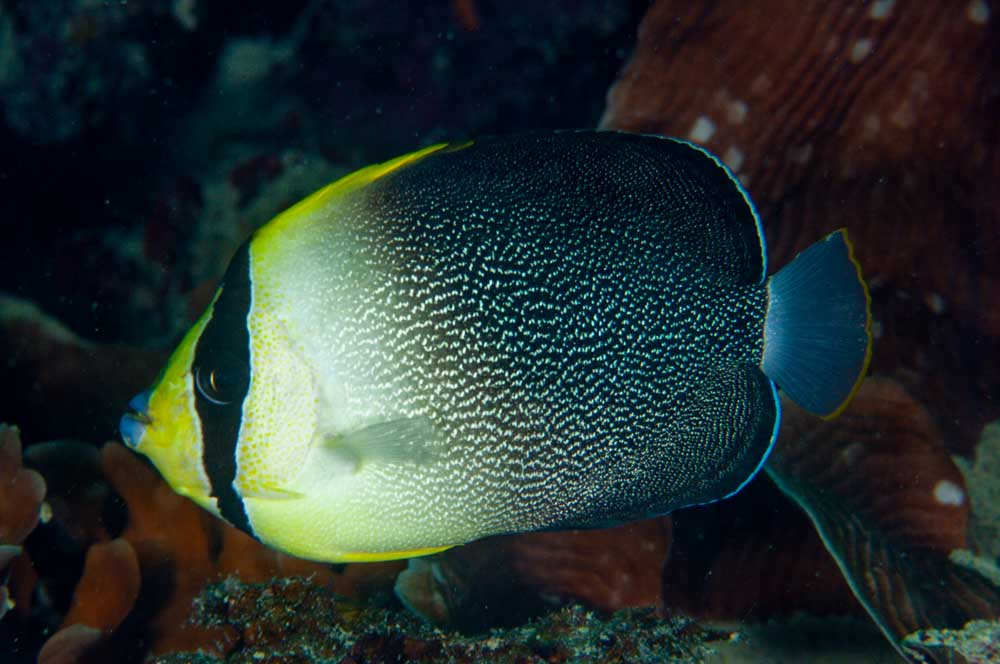
Greytail angelfish in Palau

Chaetodontoplus poliourus, the greytail angelfish, is a species of marine angelfish in the class Actinopterygii. It is found in the coastal Pacific waters of Papua New Guinea, Palau, the Solomon Islands, and Indonesia.

== Taxonomy ==
Chaetodontoplus poliourus was first described by John Ernest Randall and Luiz A. Rocha in 2009; the species holotype was taken from the island of New Britain in Papua New Guinea. It is a marine angelfish (family Pomacanthidae) of the class Actinopterygii.

This species is very similar to the closely related species Chaetodontoplus mesoleucus, the vermiculate angelfish. They are differentiated by the color of the caudal fin, which is yellow in C. mesoleucus and grey with a yellow margin in C. poliourus. The range of the two fishes overlaps in parts of Indonesia.

== Distribution ==
This fish occurs in reefs in the western Pacific Ocean. It is found in Papua New Guinea, Palau, the Solomon Islands, and parts of Indonesia, including the Lesser Sunda Islands, the Molucca Islands, Halmahera, and West Papua.

== Description ==
The fish's color gradually transitions from yellow at the head to light gray before becoming dark brown with white spots at the rear of the body. It has a black ocular bar, yellow chest, blue lips, yellow pelvic fins, grey pectoral fins; the dorsal fin begins yellow and becomes dark brown. The caudal fin, as the fish's common name, "greytail angelfish", suggests, is grey, with a yellow margin.

The dorsal fin has 12 spines and 17 soft rays. The anal fin has 3 spines and 16–17 soft rays. The fish reaches a maximum of 8.6 centimetres in standard length.

== Ecology ==
C. poliourus lives in depths of 2–25 metres in coral reefs. It prefers calm waters such as lagoons with silty substrate. It is assessed as a least concern species by the IUCN Red List due to its broad range and lack of apparent major threats to the species. It is occasionally collected for the aquarium trade.
