= Cranwell =

Village in the North Kesteven district of Lincolnshire, England

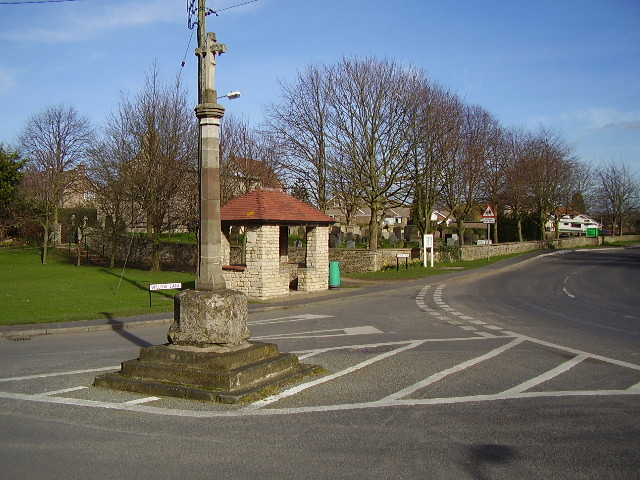
- Cranwell village centre, view of the medieval buttercross base with later addition

- Location within Lincolnshire
- Population: 2,827 (2011)
- OS grid reference: TF034502
  - London: 105 mi (169 km) S
- Civil parish: Cranwell, Brauncewell and Byard's Leap
- District: North Kesteven
- Shire county: Lincolnshire
- Region: East Midlands
- Country: England
- Sovereign state: United Kingdom
- Post town: SLEAFORD
- Postcode district: NG34
- Dialling code: 01400
- Police: Lincolnshire
- Fire: Lincolnshire
- Ambulance: East Midlands
- UK Parliament: Sleaford and North Hykeham

Cranwell is a village in the civil parish of Cranwell, Brauncewell and Byard's Leap, in the North Kesteven district of Lincolnshire, England. It is situated approximately 3 miles (5 km) north-west from Sleaford and 14 miles (23 km) south-east from Lincoln. The principal through road, the B1429 between the A15 to the east and the A17 to the west, joins the village to RAF Cranwell. The appropriate civil parish is called Cranwell, Brauncewell and Byard's Leap with a population of 2,827 at the 2011 census.

== Climate ==
The British Isles experience a temperate, maritime climate with warm summers and cool winters. Lincolnshire's position on the east of the British Isles allows for a sunnier and warmer climate relative to the national average, and it is one of the driest counties in the UK. In Cranwell, the average daily high temperature peaks at 22.1 °C (71.8 °F) in July and a peak average daily mean of 17.2 °C (63.0 °F) occurs in July. The lowest daily mean temperature is 4.1 °C (39.4 °F) in January; the average daily high for that month is 7.0 °C (44.6 °F) and the daily low is 1.3 °C (34.3 °F) (the latter also occurs in February). The East of England tends to be sheltered from strong winds relative to the north and west of the country. Despite this, tornadoes form more often in the East of England than elsewhere; Sleaford (within 3 miles (4.8 km) of Cranwell) suffered them in 2006 and 2012, both causing damage to property.

Climate data for Cranwell WMO ID: 03379; coordinates 53°01′52″N 0°30′13″W; elevation: 62 m (203 ft); 1991–2020 normals, extremes 1930–present
Month	Jan	Feb	Mar	Apr	May	Jun	Jul	Aug	Sep	Oct	Nov	Dec	Year
Record high °C (°F)	15.0 (59.0)	18.3 (64.9)	23.2 (73.8)	26.3 (79.3)	30.6 (87.1)	32.9 (91.2)	39.9 (103.8)	35.2 (95.4)	31.6 (88.9)	28.6 (83.5)	18.9 (66.0)	15.7 (60.3)	39.9 (103.8)
Mean daily maximum °C (°F)	7.0 (44.6)	7.8 (46.0)	10.4 (50.7)	13.4 (56.1)	16.5 (61.7)	19.4 (66.9)	22.1 (71.8)	21.8 (71.2)	18.6 (65.5)	14.3 (57.7)	9.9 (49.8)	7.2 (45.0)	14.1 (57.4)
Daily mean °C (°F)	4.1 (39.4)	4.6 (40.3)	6.5 (43.7)	8.9 (48.0)	11.8 (53.2)	14.8 (58.6)	17.2 (63.0)	17.0 (62.6)	14.3 (57.7)	10.8 (51.4)	6.9 (44.4)	4.4 (39.9)	10.1 (50.2)
Mean daily minimum °C (°F)	1.3 (34.3)	1.3 (34.3)	2.6 (36.7)	4.5 (40.1)	7.2 (45.0)	10.2 (50.4)	12.2 (54.0)	12.2 (54.0)	10.1 (50.2)	7.2 (45.0)	3.9 (39.0)	1.6 (34.9)	6.2 (43.2)
Record low °C (°F)	−15.7 (3.7)	−13.9 (7.0)	−11.1 (12.0)	−4.8 (23.4)	−2.2 (28.0)	0.0 (32.0)	4.5 (40.1)	3.3 (37.9)	−0.6 (30.9)	−4.4 (24.1)	−8.0 (17.6)	−11.2 (11.8)	−15.7 (3.7)
Average precipitation mm (inches)	48.1 (1.89)	38.4 (1.51)	36.3 (1.43)	44.6 (1.76)	48.4 (1.91)	59.8 (2.35)	53.5 (2.11)	59.5 (2.34)	50.5 (1.99)	62.4 (2.46)	56.6 (2.23)	54.6 (2.15)	612.6 (24.12)
Average precipitation days (≥ 1.0 mm)	10.9	9.5	9.3	9.0	8.6	9.4	9.1	9.6	8.7	10.3	11.3	11.0	116.7
Mean monthly sunshine hours	65.1	83.7	124.2	163.0	209.2	191.6	202.2	187.6	151.1	113.6	74.4	65.6	1,631.3
Source 1: Met Office
Source 2: Starlings Roost Weather

== History ==
During the medieval period the parish was originally governed as part of the ancient Flaxwell Wapentake in the North Kesteven division of Lincolnshire. The name Cranwell is thought to mean the spring or stream frequented by cranes or herons.

The village centres on the remains of the village cross. The cross is a 14th-century market cross (or buttercross) from which important matters of public moment were announced. The cross, which is listed as a scheduled monument, had restoration work carried out by a Mr CH Fowler between 1903 and 1904.

Cranwell manor was held by the Thorold family from the 16th century for over three hundred years. The manor house was demolished in 1816 and the Hall Farm's farmhouse was erected on the site. The Thorold family moved to a new mansion at Syston Park. In 1871 Sir John Thorold is recorded as owning all the land in Cranwell with the exception of the church glebelands and a single farmstead that was under the ownership of St John's College, Cambridge.

In 1682, Sir William and his wife Lady Anne Thorold are recorded as establishing a charity that gave about £8 and 2 shillings (£8.10) per year for the poor, to be distributed on Lady Day (25 March and then considered to be New Year's Day). The parish also benefited from the will of Lady Margaret Thorold who granted £15 a year to apprentice four boys from the village. With the Poor Law Amendment Act reforms of 1834, the parish became part of the Sleaford Poor Law Union group of parishes.

Cranwell railway station, on a single track branch line from Sleaford, opened in 1917 and served the naval aviation training facility then known as RNAS Daedalus, later to become RAF Cranwell. The branch line was closed in 1956 and the track removed. However, the original station building still stands and is in use as the current RAF main guardroom. Engine sheds in a small goods yard area closer to the village were demolished and the land re-used for housing.

In 1921, the civil parish had a population of 2191. On 1 April 1931 the parish was abolished and merged with Byards Leap to form "Cranwell and Byards Leap".

== Education ==
As early as 1682, Sir William and Lady Anne Thorold funded a charity that provided £3 each year for the education of poor children from within the parish. The first true school built in Cranwell opened in 1850 by public subscription and provided facilities for up to 35 children.

The current Cranwell Primary School is housed in a modern building and has approximately 300 children on the roll between the ages of 4–11. The school is a Foundation school and is non-denominational.

There are no secondary schools in the village and children instead travel to Lincoln, Grantham or Sleaford.

== RAF College Cranwell ==
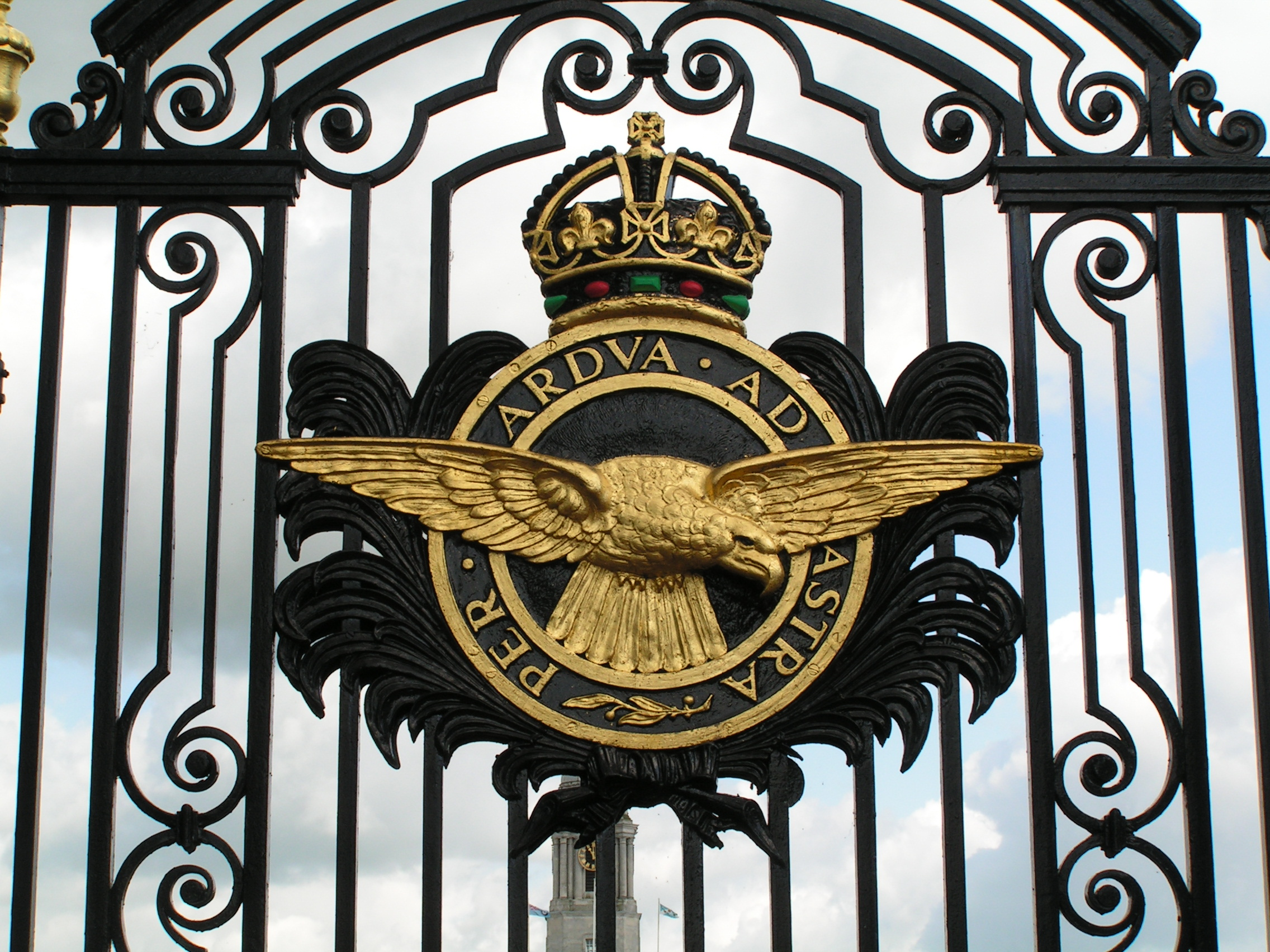
Gates of College Hall, RAF Cranwell

Just over one mile to the west of the village is Royal Air Force College Cranwell, and RAF Cranwell with its two associated airfields. The northern airfield is the older, being used for light aircraft and airships from 1916 and remains as a grassed field used regularly by gliders and light aircraft. The southern airfield is much larger with two paved runways and abuts the A17 road, this was first used as a flying training base in 1917. The paved runways were built in 1954, to make way for the jet aircraft, Meteor and Vampire.

Cranwell does not have a public house. It does, however, have a members only social club. This dates back to when the cadets training at RAF Cranwell during the Second World War used to come into the village to try to buy alcohol. The members only club was introduced as a deterrent to them, being only temporary residents in the area they were therefore unable to gain membership. To this day, no pub has ever opened its doors to the public, even though the reasons for not having one have long since become obsolete.

== Other uses of the name Cranwell ==
The surname Cranwell occurs in Buckinghamshire and Essex (at least), it appears in the Domesday Book. A few very small farms and hamlets are named Cranwell in Bucks.
