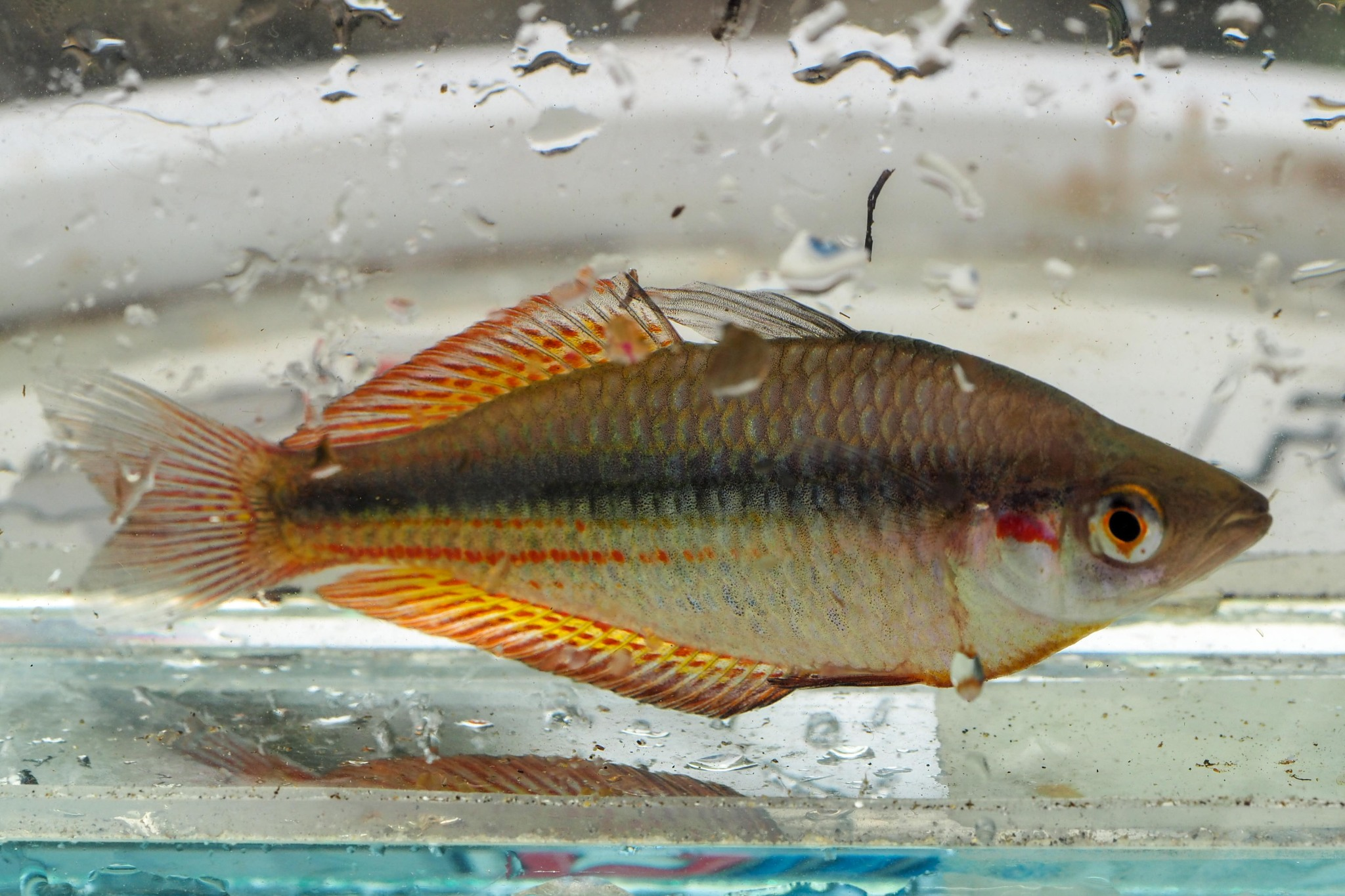
- In Queensland

Scientific classification
- Kingdom: Animalia
- Phylum: Chordata
- Class: Actinopterygii
- Order: Atheriniformes
- Family: Melanotaeniidae
- Genus: Melanotaenia
- Species: M. duboulayi

Binomial name
- Melanotaenia duboulayi (Castelnau, 1878)

Synonyms
- Atherinichthys duboulayi Castelnau, 1878

= Melanotaenia duboulayi =

Species of fish

Melanotaenia duboulayi, the crimson-spotted rainbowfish, less commonly known as the Duboulay's rainbowfish, is a species of freshwater fish endemic to coastal eastern Australia, although M. duboulayi has also been kept as an aquarium fish since the early 20th century, and is the original "Australian rainbowfish".

== Taxonomy ==
Melanotaenia duboulayi was initially collected by Duboulay (du Boulay), probably the naturalist and illustrator Francis Houssemayne du Boulay (1837–1914), in the 1870s from the Richmond River in northeastern New South Wales, although he is best known for Coleoptera. It was scientifically described as Atherinichthys duboulayi by Francis de Castelnau in 1878. It was later known as Nematocentris fluviatilis and Melanotaenia fluviatilis. It was reclassified as Melanotaenia splendida fluviatilis following a review of the rainbowfish group by Allen in 1980. The current scientific name, Melanotaenia duboulayi, given by Crowley, et al. in 1986, is a result of the study of early stages of life. This study separated M. splendida fluviatilis into two species, M. duboulayi from the coastal river systems east of the Great Dividing Range in northeastern New South Wales and southeastern Queensland, and M. fluviatilis from the inland Murray-Darling basin system west of the Great Dividing Range.

== Description ==
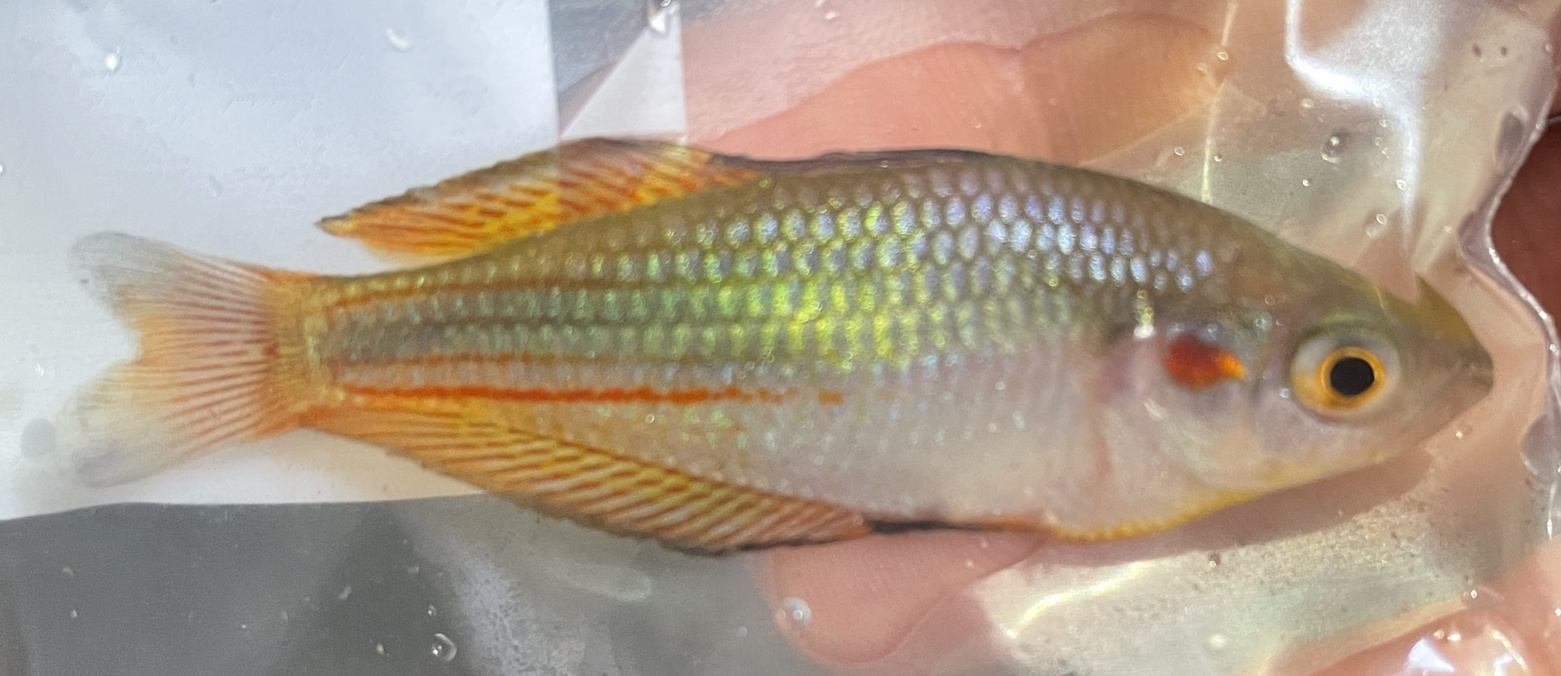
In Queensland

Male M. duboulayi reach maximum body lengths of 12 cm (4.7 in), but are usually less than 10 cm (3.9 in), while the females are usually smaller. They have a slender and compressed body shape, and have two dorsal fins very close together, with the first much smaller than the second. Their fin colours vary from clear to yellowish to red, with red flecks and dark margins which become intensely black in males during spawning activities. The larger males are distinguished from females by their brighter colours and can be identified from the elongation of posterior rays in the second dorsal and anal fins. Females have rounded dorsal and anal fins, which are smaller and lack the dark edges. A prominent spot of crimson red is seen on the operculum. Generally, the body is silvery-blue or green ranging through deep bluish or yellow tones. The scale rows are marked with narrow yellow lines and overlaid with orange to brilliant red. They exhibit considerable colour variations over a wide geographical range.

== Behaviour ==
M. duboulayi is omnivorous, and their diet comprises all kinds of foods, especially invertebrates and algae, and in captivity they eat flake food. They like open water and may form small groups around submerged logs and subsurface vegetation.

Spawning occurs prior to summer rains, and the eggs adhere to filamentous subsurface vegetation and floating plant roots.

A controlled study comparing six native fish species with the introduced (and invasive) eastern mosquitofish (Gambusia holbrooki) on consuming larvae of the common banded mosquito (Culex annulirostris) in Brisbane found that the crimson-spotted rainbowfish ate more mosquito larvae than all other species tested and is a good candidate for mosquito control.

== Domestication ==
Crimson-spotted rainbowfish were favorably described by Castelnau in his initial description: "...He says the colours during life were most beautiful; that a broad stripe of magnificent blue ran along the sides, and two transverse bands of rich scarlet extended on the upper part of the fish towards the middle of the body."

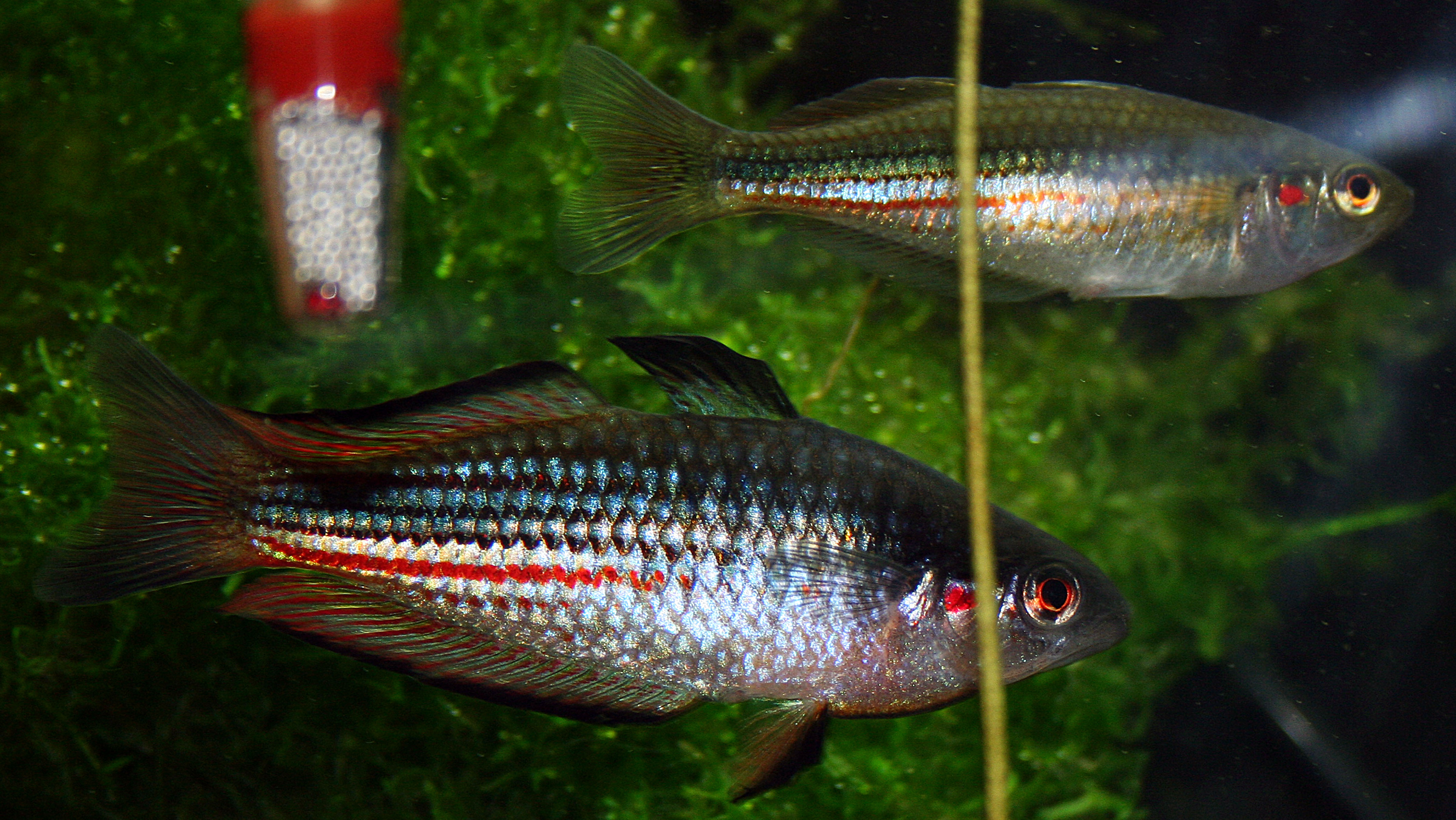
Male and female in captivity

Amandus Rudel introduced the species to international aquarium hobbyists when he sent specimens to Germany in 1927, and it went from there to North America. In 1930, it was found as an escapee in the Mississippi River.

Crimson-spotted rainbowfish are still very popular with aquarists internationally. Australian breeders place greater emphasis of preserving the local variants. In their native range, they are also released into Australian dams to control mosquitoes using local wild stock to prevent endemic variants of M.duboulayi from being lost by genetic contamination from non-local forms.
