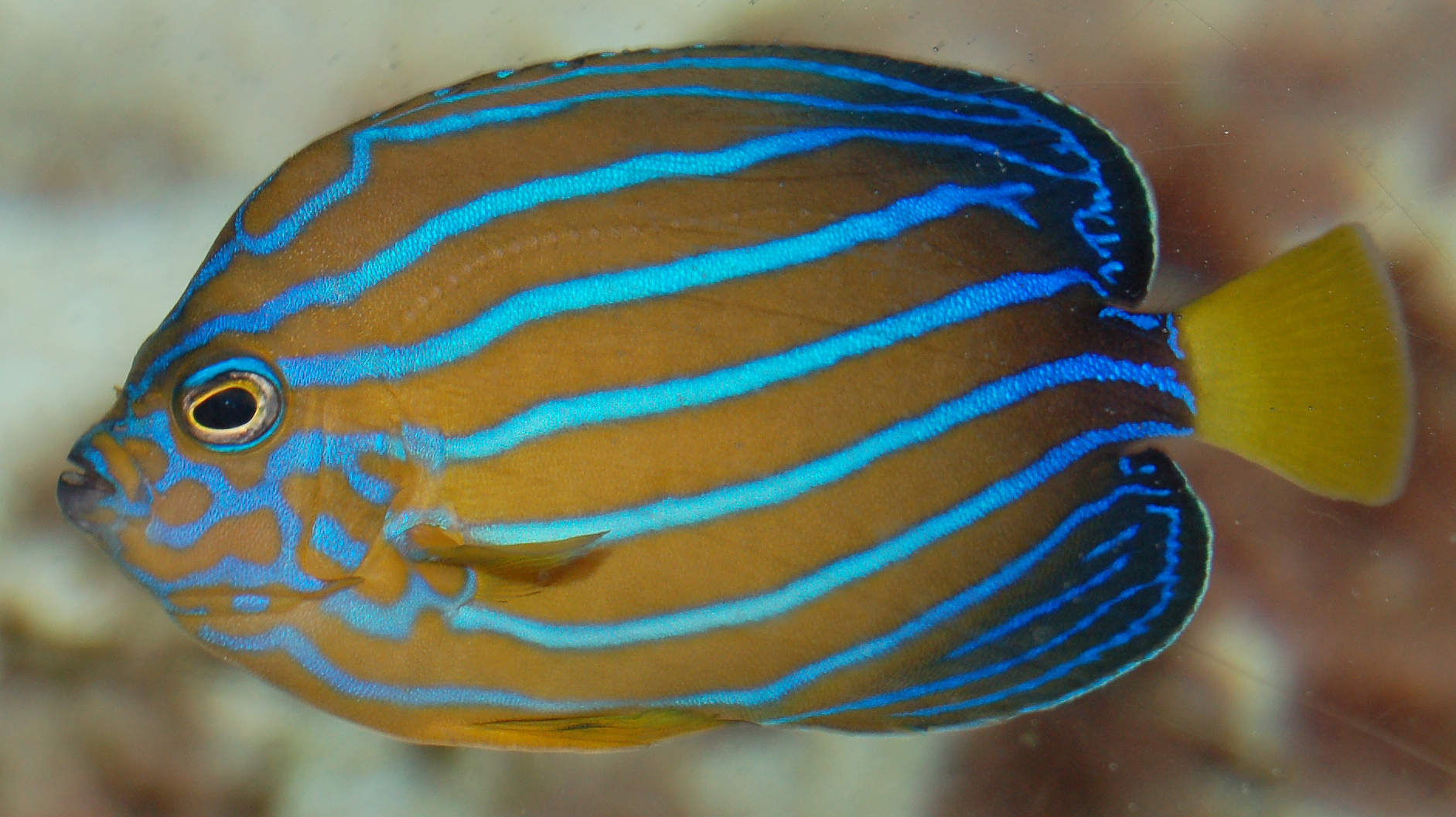

Conservation status
- Least Concern (IUCN 3.1)

Scientific classification
- Kingdom: Animalia
- Phylum: Chordata
- Class: Actinopterygii
- Order: Acanthuriformes
- Family: Pomacanthidae
- Genus: Chaetodontoplus
- Species: C. septentrionalis

Binomial name
- Chaetodontoplus septentrionalis (Temminck & Schlegel, 1844)

Synonyms
- Holacanthus septentrionalis Temminck & Schlegel, 1844

= Chaetodontoplus septentrionalis =

Species of fish

Chaetodontoplus septentrionalis, the blue-striped angelfish and bluelined angelfish, is a species of marine ray-finned fish, a marine angelfish belonging to the family Pomacanthidae. it is found in the Western Pacific Ocean.

== Description ==
Chaetodontoplus septentrionalis has a background body colour of yellow to tan overlain with vivid longitudinal blue stripes and a yellow caudal fin. In the females the blue stripes run the length of the body. In the males the lines on the body are duller and they have blue lines on the face. The juveniles have a black background colour and there are yellow markings on their fins and a yellow bar to the rear of the head.

== Distribution ==
Chaetodontoplus septentrionalis occurs in the western Pacific Ocean from southern Japan and South Korea and Taiwan and southern China.

== Habitat and biology ==
Chaetodontoplus septentrionalis is commonest on rocky reefs which have large boulders and stones, as well as rubble slopes. It is found at depths of 2 to 30 metres (6.6 to 98.4 ft). Small juveniles are frequently commoner at depths over 15 metres (49 ft) down to 30 metres (98 ft) they are found on rocky, patch reefs and frequently stay close to a crevice where they can shelter if required. It feeds on sponges and tunicates. Like all other angelfish it is a protogynous hermaphrodite, with all individuals being female initially and the dominant ones changing to males.

== Systematics ==
Chaetodontoplus septentrionalis was first formally described in 1844 by Coenraad Jacob Temminck and Hermann Schlegel with the type locality given as Nagasaki. The specific name means northern, thought to be a reference to its more northerly distribution than apparently related species.

== Utlisation ==
Chaetondontoplus septentrionalis is infrequently traded in the aquarium trade but when it does appear it often thrives in captivity.
