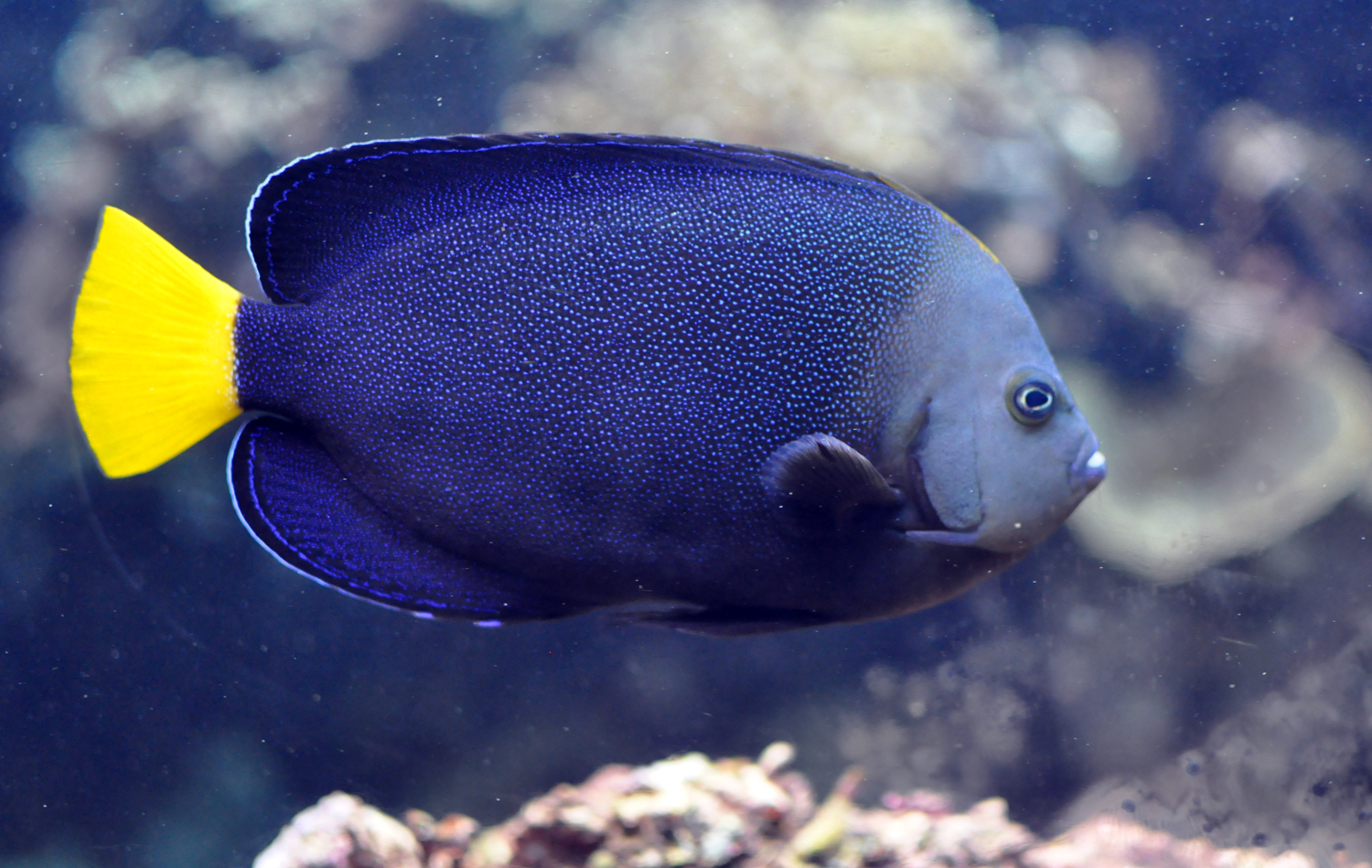

Conservation status
- Data Deficient (IUCN 3.1)

Scientific classification
- Kingdom: Animalia
- Phylum: Chordata
- Class: Actinopterygii
- Order: Acanthuriformes
- Family: Pomacanthidae
- Genus: Chaetodontoplus
- Species: C. caeruleopunctatus

Binomial name
- Chaetodontoplus caeruleopunctatus Yasuda & Tominaga, 1976

= Chaetodontoplus caeruleopunctatus =

Species of fish

Chaetodontoplus caeruleopunctatus, the bluespotted angelfish, is a species of marine ray-finned fish, a marine angelfish belonging to the family Pomacanthidae. It is from the Western-Pacific Ocean.

== Description ==
Chaetodontoplus caeruleopunctatus has a pale orange-brown head and anterior part of the body, while the remainder of the body is dusky brown to bluish-black marked with dense blue spots. The dorsal and anal fins are dark brown with blue margins, while the caudal fin is vivid yellow. The juveniles are dark brown, pearl black with a yellow stripe on the forward part of the back and another on the head and around the dorsal fin, their tail is yellow and white. The dorsal fin contains 13 spines and 17 soft rays while the anal fin has 3 spines and 17 soft rays. This species attains a maximum total length of 20 centimetres (7.9 in).

== Distribution ==
Chaetodontoplus caeruleopunctatus is endemic to the Philippines where it is rarely recorded in the wild.

== Habitat and biology ==
Chaetodontoplus caeruleopunctatus is found at depths between 14 and 40 metres (46 and 131 ft). It prefers rock areas with a rich growth of sponges and algae. Its diet is composed of sponges and tunicates. Like all other angelfish it is a protogynous hermaphrodite, with all individuals being female initially and the dominant ones changing to males.

== Systematics ==
Chaetodontoplus caeruleopunctatus was first formally described in 1976 by the Japanese ichthyologists Fujio Yasuda and Yoshiaki Tominaga with the type locality given as the Philippines. The position of this species is indeterminate and its closest relatives have not yet been resolved. It was proposed that it was a hybrid but the consistency of appearance of specimens collected and their numbers strongly suggest it is a valid species.

== Utlisation ==
Chaetodontoplus caeruleopunctatus despite its apparent rarity in the wild is quite frequently found in the aquarium trade and has been bred in captivity.
