= Brauncewell =

Hamlet and former civil parish in the North Kesteven district of Lincolnshire, England

Coordinates: 53.055413°N 0.489765°W

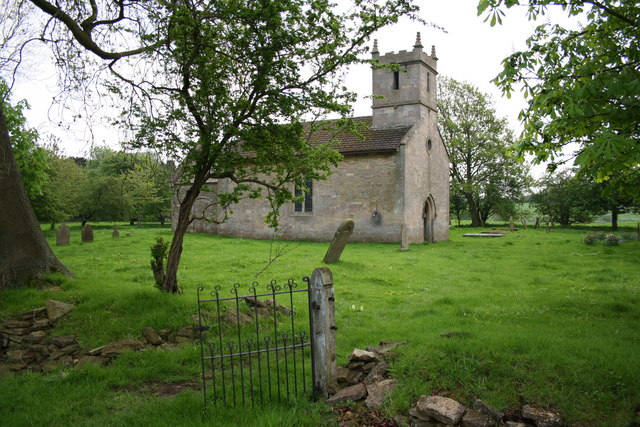
- Church of All Saints, Brauncewell

- Location within Lincolnshire
- Population: 521 (2001 census)
- OS grid reference: TF013519
  - London: 110 mi (180 km) S
- Civil parish: Cranwell, Brauncewell and Byard's Leap
- District: North Kesteven
- Shire county: Lincolnshire
- Region: East Midlands
- Country: England
- Sovereign state: United Kingdom
- Post town: Lincoln
- Postcode district: LN1
- Police: Lincolnshire
- Fire: Lincolnshire
- Ambulance: East Midlands
- UK Parliament: Sleaford and North Hykeham

Brauncewell is a hamlet and former civil parish, now in the parish of Cranwell, Brauncewell and Byard's Leap, in the North Kesteven district of Lincolnshire, England. It is situated between Leadenham and the market town of Sleaford, and is north east from, and in close proximity to, RAF Cranwell. In 2001 the parish had a population of 521. On 1 April 2011 the parish was abolished and merged with Cranwell and Byard's Leap to form "Cranwell, Brauncewell and Byard's Leap".

Brauncewell Grade II listed Anglican parish church is dedicated to All Saints. Built in the 16th century over an earlier church, it was largely rebuilt in 1857. It includes a grave cover in the nave dated between the 10th and 12th century. The church is now redundant.

Brauncewell is close to a large quarry.

A Bronze Age Barrow burial site, and Roman sites, have been identified within the parish.

The former parish contains the remains of two deserted medieval villages:

- Brauncewell, east of Brauncewell TF046524
- Dunsby, east-south-east of Brauncewell TF039514
