= Armes Beaumont =

Australian vocalist (1842–1913)

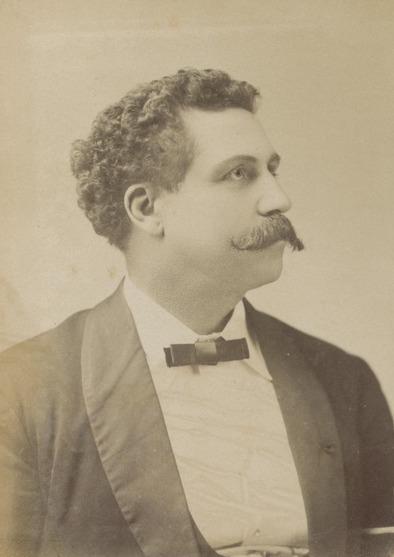
- Beaumont c. 1890s

Background information
- Birth name: Edward Armes Beaumont
- Born: 15 December 1842; St Faith's, Norfolk, England
- Died: 17 July 1913 (aged 70); North Melbourne, Victoria, Australia
- Genres: Vocalist

Edward Armes Beaumont (15 December 1842 – 17 July 1913) was a vocalist active in Australia.

Beaumont was born in St Faith's, Norfolk, England. He and his family moved to Melbourne in 1848 and later he sang in the choir at the Wesleyan Chapel in Brunswick St.

In 1870, he joined William Lyster's opera company and increased his concert singing, notably with the Royal Melbourne Philharmonic Society.

He died at his home in North Melbourne on 17 July 1913.
