= Charles Clark (lecturer) =

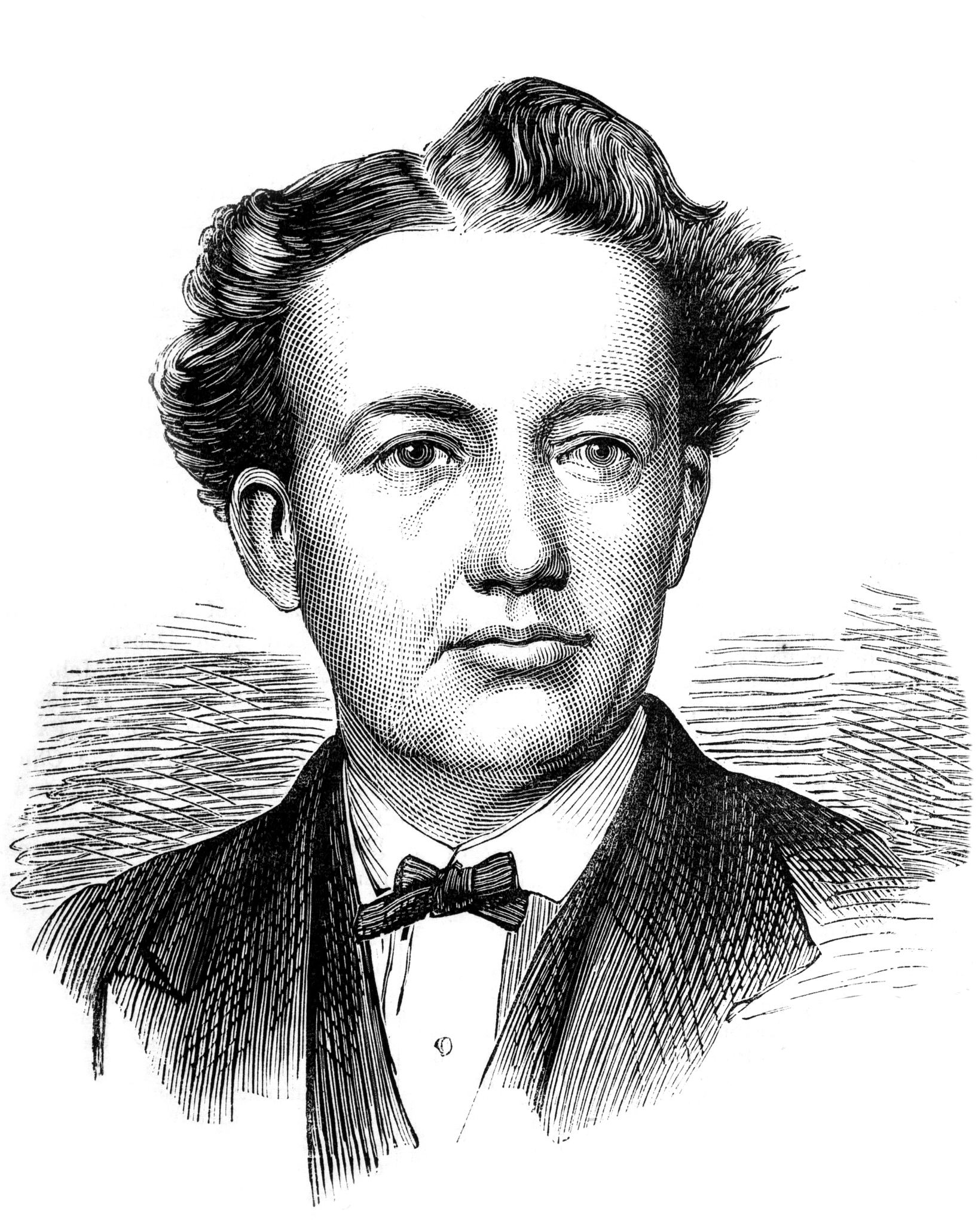
Charles Clark, 1875 engraving

Charles Clark (19 April 1838 – 29 March 1903) was a Baptist minister and lecturer.

Clark was born in London and entered the Baptist College at Nottingham as a student for the ministry. After filling several charges in London and the provinces, he accepted the pastorate of the Baptist Church in Albert Park, Melbourne, Victoria (Australia) where he arrived in April 1869.

Having been very successful as an amateur lecturer on secular subjects, Clark resigned his pastoral charge in 1874, and lectured professionally throughout the Australian colonies with extraordinary success.

Mr. Clark was gifted with a wonderfully retentive memory, great dramatic force, a powerful and melodious voice, and, above all, a fine quality of delicate sympathy and largeheartedness which brought him into direct touch with the public, and instinctively prompted him to select for his themes subjects which appealed to the emotions and loftier sensibilities of all classes of the community. Acting on the maxim 'The highest study of mankind is man,' Mr. Clark committed to memory the choicest selections from the writings of Charles Dickens, and recited them with such remarkable displays of feeling as to move his hearers either to laughter or to tears; He was just the kind of man to enter into the spirit of Dickens's works, and to represent him fairly; for, like that immortal author, he had wide sympathies for all that is human, a keen eye for the grotesque, and a profound contempt for all hypocrisies, and make-believes. But his repertoire covered an extensive and interesting field, and his chief aim was to convey instruction on the history and poetry of the British nation. A lecture on 'Christmas in Old England' was repeated hundreds of times, and another on the 'Tower of London' was immensely .successful.

After a tour in America in 1876, where he attracted large audiences, he returned to Australia, but shortly afterwards left for England, where he remained till 1889, when he revisited Australia, and achieved a considerable measure of his former success. He again toured Australia in 1896, which was also a success.

Clark died on 29 March 1903 in Bristol, England.
