= List of schools in Lincolnshire =

This is a list of schools in Lincolnshire, England.

== State-funded schools ==
=== Primary schools ===
- Alford Primary School, Alford
- Allington with Sedgebrook CE Primary School, Allington
- Ancaster CE Primary School, Ancaster
- Bardney CE and Methodist Primary School, Bardney
- Barkston and Syston CE Primary School, Barkston
- Barrowby CE Primary School, Barrowby
- Bassingham Primary School, Bassingham
- Baston CE Primary School, Baston
- Beacon Primary Academy, Skegness
- Belmont Community Primary School, Grantham
- Belton Lane Community Primary School, Grantham
- Benjamin Adlard Primary School, Gainsborough
- Billingborough Primary School, Billingborough
- The Billinghay CE Primary School, Billinghay
- Binbrook CE Primary School, Binbrook
- The Bluecoat School, Stamford
- Blyton Cum Laughton CE School, Blyton
- Boston Pioneers Free School Academy, Boston
- Boston St Mary's RC Primary Academy, Boston
- Boston West Academy, Boston
- Bourne Abbey CE Academy, Bourne
- Bourne Elsea Park CE Primary Academy, Bourne
- Bourne Westfield Primary Academy, Bourne
- Bracebridge Heath St John's Primary Academy, Bracebridge Heath
- Bracebridge Infant and Nursery School, Bracebridge
- Branston CE Infant Academy, Branston
- Branston Junior Academy, Branston
- Brant Broughton CE and Methodist Primary School, Brant Broughton
- Brown's CE Primary School, Horbling
- Bucknall Primary School, Bucknall
- The Butterwick Pinchbeck's CE Primary School, Butterwick
- Bythams Primary School, Little Bytham
- Caistor CE and Methodist Primary School, Caistor
- Carlton Road Academy, Boston
- Castle Wood Academy, Gainsborough
- Caythorpe Primary School, Caythorpe
- Chapel St Leonards Primary School, Chapel St Leonards
- Cherry Willingham Primary Academy, Cherry Willingham
- Church Lane Primary School, Sleaford
- The Claypole CE Primary School, Claypole
- Cliffedale Primary School, Grantham
- Clough and Risegate Community Primary School, Gosberton Clough
- Coleby CE Primary School, Coleby
- Colsterworth CE Primary School, Colsterworth
- Coningsby St Michael's CE Primary School, Coningsby
- Corby Glen Community Primary School, Corby Glen
- Corringham CE Primary School, Corringham
- The Cowbit St Mary's CE Primary School, Cowbit
- Cranwell Primary School, Cranwell
- Deeping St James Community Primary School, Deeping St James
- Deeping St Nicholas Primary School, Deeping St Nicholas
- Denton CE School, Denton
- Digby CE School, Digby
- Digby the Tedder Primary School, Ashby de la Launde
- The Donington Cowley Primary School, Donington
- The Donington-on-Bain School, Donington on Bain
- Dunholme St Chad's CE Primary School, Dunholme
- Dunston St Peter's CE Primary School, Dunston
- Eagle Community Primary School, Eagle
- East Wold CE Primary School, Legbourne
- Eastfield Infants and Nursery Academy, Louth
- The Edenham CE School, Edenham
- The Edward Richardson Primary School, Tetford
- Ellison Boulters Academy, Scothern
- Ermine Primary Academy, Lincoln
- Faldingworth Community Primary School, Faldingworth
- Fishtoft Academy, Fishtoft
- Fiskerton CE Primary School, Fiskerton
- Fleet Wood Lane School, Fleet
- Fosse Way Academy, North Hykeham
- The Fourfields CE School, Sutterton
- Frances Olive Anderson CE Primary School, Lea
- Friskney All Saints CE Primary School, Friskney
- Frithville Primary School, Frithville
- Fulstow CE Primary School, Fulstow
- The Gainsborough Charles Baines Primary School, Gainsborough
- The Gainsborough Hillcrest Early Years Academy, Gainsborough
- The Gainsborough Parish Church Primary School, Gainsborough
- Gedney Church End Primary Academy, Gedney
- Gedney Drove End Primary School, Gedney Drove End
- The Gedney Hill CE Primary School, Gedney
- The Gonerby Hill Foot CE Primary School, Gonerby Hill Foot
- Gipsey Bridge Academy, Gipsey Bridge
- Gosberton Academy, Gosberton
- Grainthorpe Junior School, Grainthorpe
- Grasby All Saints CE Primary School, Grasby
- Great Ponton CE School, Great Ponton
- Great Steeping Primary School, Great Steeping
- Grimoldby Primary School, Grimoldby
- The Hackthorn CE Primary School, Hackthorn
- Halton Holegate CE Primary School, Halton Holegate
- The Harlaxton CE Primary School, Harlaxton
- The Harrowby CE Primary School, Grantham
- Hartsholme Academy, Lincoln
- Hawthorn Tree School, Boston
- Heckington St Andrew's CE School, Heckington
- Heighington Millfield Primary Academy, Heighington
- Helpringham School, Helpringham
- Hemswell Cliff Primary School, Hemswell Cliff
- Hogsthorpe Primary Academy, Hogsthorpe
- Holbeach Bank Primary Academy, Holbeach Bank
- Holbeach Primary Academy, Holbeach
- The Holbeach St Mark's CE Primary School, Holbeach St Marks
- The Holbeach William Stukeley CE Primary School, Holbeach
- Holton-le-Clay Infant School, Holton-le-Clay
- Holton-le-Clay Junior School, Holton-le-Clay
- Horncastle Primary School, Horncastle
- The Horncastle St Lawrence School, Horncastle
- Huntingtower Academy, Grantham
- Huttoft Primary School, Huttoft
- Ingham Primary School, Ingham
- Ingoldmells Academy, Ingoldmells
- Ingoldsby Academy, Ingoldsby
- The Isaac Newton Primary School, Grantham
- The John Harrox Primary School, Moulton
- Keelby Primary Academy, Keelby
- Kelsey Primary School, North Kelsey
- The Kirkby-la-Thorpe CE Primary School, Kirkby la Thorpe
- The Kirkby-on-Bain CE Primary School, Kirkby on Bain
- Kirton Primary School, Kirton
- Lacey Gardens Junior Academy, Louth
- The Lancaster School, Birchwood
- Langtoft Primary School, Langtoft
- Leadenham CE Primary School, Leadenham
- The Leasingham St Andrew's CE Primary School, Leasingham
- Legsby Primary School, Legsby
- Leslie Manser Primary School, Lincoln
- Linchfield Academy, Deeping St James
- Lincoln Birchwood Junior School, Lincoln
- The Lincoln Bishop King CE Primary School, Lincoln
- Lincoln Carlton Academy, Lincoln
- The Lincoln Manor Leas Infants School, Lincoln
- The Lincoln Manor Leas Junior School, Lincoln
- Lincoln Monks Abbey Primary School, Lincoln
- The Lincoln St Peter at Gowts CE Primary School, Lincoln
- The Lincoln St Peter-in-Eastgate CE Infants School, Lincoln
- Ling Moor Primary Academy, North Hykeham
- The Little Gonerby CE Primary School, Grantham
- Long Bennington CE Academy, Long Bennington
- Long Sutton County Primary School, Long Sutton
- Louth Kidgate Primary Academy, Louth
- Lutton St Nicholas Primary Academy, Lutton
- Mablethorpe Primary Academy, Mablethorpe
- Malcolm Sargent Primary School, Stamford
- Manor Farm Academy, North Hykeham
- The Mareham-le-Fen CE Primary School, Mareham le Fen
- Market Deeping Community Primary School, Market Deeping
- The Market Rasen CE Primary School, Market Rasen
- Marshchapel Infant School, Marshchapel
- The Marston Thorold's CE School, Marston
- The Marton Academy, Marton
- The Meadows Primary School, Lincoln
- Mercer's Wood Academy, Gainsborough
- The Metheringham Primary School, Metheringham
- The Middle Rasen Primary School, Middle Rasen
- The Morton CE Primary School, Morton and Hanthorpe
- Morton Trentside Primary School, Morton by Gainsborough
- Moulton Chapel Primary School, Moulton Chapel
- Mount Street Academy, Lincoln
- Mrs Mary King's CE Primary School, Martin
- Navenby CE Primary School, Navenby
- The Nettleham CE Junior School, Nettleham
- The Nettleham Infant and Nursery School, Nettleham
- Nettleton Community Primary School, Nettleton
- The New Leake Primary School, New Leake
- New York Primary School, New York
- Newton-on-Trent CE Primary School, Newton on Trent
- Nocton Community Primary School, Nocton
- Normanby Primary School, Normanby by Spital
- The North Cotes CE Primary School, North Cotes
- North Cockerington CE Primary School, North Cockerington
- The North Hykeham All Saints CE Primary School, North Hykeham
- North Scarle Primary School, North Scarle
- North Somercotes CE Primary School, North Somercotes
- North Thoresby Primary Academy, North Thoresby
- Old Leake Primary Academy, Old Leake
- Osbournby Primary School, Osbournby
- Osgodby Primary School, Osgodby
- Our Lady of Good Counsel RC Primary School, Sleaford
- Our Lady of Lincoln RC Primary School, Lincoln
- Park Academy, Boston
- Partney CE Primary School, Partney
- The Pinchbeck East CE Primary Academy, Pinchbeck
- Pollyplatt Primary School, Scampton
- Poplar Farm School, Grantham
- The Potterhanworth CE Primary School, Potterhanworth
- The Priory Witham Academy, Lincoln
- Quadring Cowley & Brown's Primary School, Quadring
- Rauceby CE Primary School, North Rauceby
- Reepham CE Primary School, Reepham
- The Richmond School, Skegness
- The Ropsley CE Primary School, Ropsley
- Ruskington Chestnut Street CE Academy, Ruskington
- St Andrew's CE Primary School, Woodhall Spa
- St Anne's CE Primary School, Grantham
- The St Augustine's RC Academy, Stamford
- St Bartholomew's CE Primary School, Pinchbeck
- St Botolph's CE Primary School, Sleaford
- The St Faith and St Martin CE Junior School, Lincoln
- The St Faith's CE Infant and Nursery School, Lincoln
- St George's CE Primary School, Gainsborough
- St George's CE Primary School, Stamford
- The St Gilbert of Sempringham CE Primary School, Pointon
- St Giles Academy, Lincoln
- St Helena's CE Primary School, Willoughby
- The St Hugh's RC Primary Academy, Lincoln
- St Lawrence CE Primary School, Skellingthorpe
- The St Margaret's CE School, Withern
- The St Mary's RC Academy, Grantham
- The St Michael's CE Primary School, Thorpe on the Hill
- St Michael's CE School, Louth
- St Nicholas CE Primary Academy, Boston
- St Norbert's RC Academy, Spalding
- St Paul's Community Primary School, Spalding
- The St Peter and St Paul CE Primary School, Burgh le Marsh
- The St Sebastian's CE Primary School, Great Gonerby
- St Thomas CE Primary Academy, Boston
- St Wulfram's National CE Primary School, Grantham
- Saxilby CE Primary School, Saxilby
- Scamblesby CE Primary School, Scamblesby
- Scampton CE Primary School, Scampton
- Scotter Primary School, Scotter
- Seathorne Primary Academy, Winthorpe
- Shepeau Stow Primary School, Shepeau Stow
- The Sibsey Free Primary School, Sibsey
- Sir Francis Hill Community Primary School, Lincoln
- Skegness Infant Academy, Skegness
- Skegness Junior Academy, Skegness
- Skellingthorpe the Holt Primary School, Skellingthorpe
- The South Hykeham Community Primary School, South Hykeham
- South View Community Primary School, Crowland
- South Witham Academy, South Witham
- The Spalding Monkshouse Primary School, Spalding
- Spalding Parish CE Day School, Spalding
- Spalding Primary Academy, Spalding
- The Spalding St John the Baptist CE Primary School, Spalding
- Spilsby Primary School, Spilsby
- Stamford St Gilberts CE Primary School, Stamford
- Staniland Academy, Boston
- Stickney CE Primary School, Stickney
- Sturton by Stow Primary School, Sturton by Stow
- Surfleet Primary School, Surfleet
- Sutton Bridge Westmere Community Primary School, Sutton Bridge
- Sutton St James Community Primary School, Sutton St James
- Sutton-on-Sea Community Primary School, Sutton-on-Sea
- Swinderby All Saints CE Primary School, Swinderby
- Swineshead St Mary's CE Primary School, Swineshead
- Tattershall Holy Trinity CE Primary School, Tattershall
- Tattershall Primary School, Tattershall
- Tealby School, Tealby
- Tetney Primary School, Tetney
- Theddlethorpe Academy, Theddlethorpe St Helen
- Thurlby Community Primary Academy, Thurlby
- Tower Road Academy, Boston
- Toynton All Saints Primary School, Toynton All Saints
- The Tydd St Mary CE Primary School, Tydd St Mary
- The Uffington CE Primary School, Uffington
- The Utterby Primary Academy, Utterby
- Waddingham Primary School, Waddingham
- Waddington All Saints Academy, Waddington
- Waddington Redwood Primary Academy, Waddington
- The Wainfleet Magdalen CE/Methodist School, Wainfleet All Saints
- Walcott Primary School, Walcott
- Washingborough Academy, Washingborough
- The Welbourn CE Primary School, Welbourn
- Welton St Mary's CE Primary Academy, Welton
- West Grantham CE Primary Academy, Grantham
- Westgate Academy, Lincoln
- Weston Hills CE Primary School, Weston Hills
- Weston St Mary CE Primary School, Weston
- Whaplode CE Primary School, Whaplode
- White's Wood Academy, Gainsborough
- William Alvey School, Sleaford
- William Hildyard CE Primary and Nursery School, Market Deeping
- Willoughton Primary School, Willoughton
- Winchelsea Primary School, Ruskington
- Witham St Hughs Academy, Witham St Hughs
- Woodlands Infant and Nursery School, Birchwood
- Wragby Primary School, Wragby
- Wrangle Primary School, Wrangle
- Wyberton Primary Academy, Wyberton
- Wygate Park Academy, Spalding

=== Non-selective secondary schools ===
- Banovallum School, Horncastle
- Barnes Wallis Academy, Tattershall
- Bourne Academy, Bourne
- Branston Community Academy, Branston
- Caistor Yarborough Academy, Caistor
- Charles Read Academy, Corby Glen
- Cowley Academy, Donington
- De Aston School, Market Rasen
- The Deepings School, Deeping St James
- The Gainsborough Academy, Gainsborough
- Giles Academy, Old Leake
- Haven High Academy, Boston
- John Spendluffe Technology College, Alford
- King Edward VI Academy, Spilsby
- Lincoln Castle Academy, Lincoln
- Lincoln Christ's Hospital School, Lincoln
- Lincoln UTC, Lincoln
- Louth Academy, Louth
- North Kesteven Academy, North Hykeham
- The Priory Academy LSST, Lincoln
- Priory City of Lincoln Academy, Lincoln
- Priory Pembroke Academy, Cherry Willingham
- The Priory Ruskin Academy, Grantham
- The Priory Witham Academy, Lincoln
- St George's Academy, Sleaford
- St Peter and St Paul's Catholic Voluntary Academy, Lincoln
- Spalding Academy, Spalding
- Sir Robert Pattinson Academy, North Hykeham
- Sir William Robertson Academy, Welbourn
- Skegness Academy, Skegness
- Somercotes Academy, North Somercotes
- Stamford Welland Academy, Stamford
- Thomas Middlecott Academy, Kirton
- University Academy Holbeach, Holbeach
- University Academy Long Sutton, Long Sutton
- Walton Academy, Grantham
- West Grantham Church of England Secondary Academy, Grantham
- William Farr School, Welton
- William Lovell Church of England Academy, Stickney

=== Grammar schools ===
- Boston Grammar School, Boston
- Boston High School, Boston
- Bourne Grammar School, Bourne
- Caistor Grammar School, Caistor
- Carre's Grammar School, Sleaford
- Kesteven and Grantham Girls' School, Grantham
- Kesteven and Sleaford High School, Sleaford
- King Edward VI Grammar School, Louth
- The King's School, Grantham
- Queen Elizabeth's Grammar School, Alford
- Queen Elizabeth's Grammar School, Horncastle
- Queen Elizabeth's High School, Gainsborough
- Skegness Grammar School, Skegness
- Spalding Grammar School, Spalding
- Spalding High School, Spalding

=== Special and alternative schools ===
- Acorn Free School, Lincoln
- Aegir Academy, Gainsborough
- Ambergate Sports College, Grantham
- Athena School, Lincoln
- The Eresby School, Spilsby
- Fortuna School, Lincoln
- Gosberton House Academy, Gosberton
- The Grantham Sandon School, Grantham
- Greenfields Academy, Grantham
- The John Fielding Special School, Boston
- The Lincoln St Christopher's School, Lincoln
- The Pilgrim School, Lincoln
- St Bernard's School, Louth
- The St Francis Special School, Lincoln
- Springwell Alternative Academy, Grantham
- Springwell Alternative Academy, Lincoln
- Springwell Alternative Academy, Mablethorpe
- Springwell Alternative Academy, Spalding
- Tulip Academy, Spalding
- Warren Wood Academy, Gainsborough
- Willoughby Academy, Bourne
- Woodlands Academy, Spilsby

=== Further education ===
- Boston College
- Grantham College
- Lincoln College
- New College Stamford
- Riseholme College
- Sleaford Joint Sixth Form

== Independent schools ==
=== Primary and preparatory schools ===
- Ayscoughfee Hall School, Spalding
- Burton Hathow Preparatory School, Burton
- Copthill Independent Day School, Uffington
- Dudley House School, Grantham
- Grantham Preparatory School, Grantham
- Greenwich House School, Louth
- Handel House Preparatory School, Gainsborough
- St George's Preparatory School, Boston
- St Hugh's School, Woodhall Spa
- Stamford Junior School, Stamford
- Witham Hall, Witham on the Hill

=== Senior and all-through schools ===
- Kirkstone House School, Baston
- Lincoln Minster School, Lincoln
- Stamford High School, Stamford
- Stamford School, Stamford

=== Special and alternative schools ===
- Aspiration House School, Boston
- Bridge House Independent School, Boston
- Build-a-Future Independent School, West Ashby
- Castle Futures, Lincoln
- Compass Community School Lincolnshire, Osbournby
- Esland Isaac Newton School, Grantham
- Holton Sleaford Independent School, Sleaford
- Kisimul School, Swinderby
- Witham Prospect School, Norton Disney

=== Further education ===
- First College Lincs
