= Gleed =

Gleed may refer to:

== Schools ==
- Sir John Gleed School, former name of Spalding Academy, Lincolnshire, Spalding, Lincolnshire, England, which amalgamated in 2011:
  - Gleed Girls' Technology College
  - Gleed Boys' School

== Other uses ==
- Gleed (surname)
- Gleed, Washington, United States, a census-designated place
- Danuta Gleed Literary Award
