= Nick Johnston (politician) =

Scottish politician (born 1948)

Member of the Scottish Parliament for Mid Scotland and Fife
- In office 6 May 1999 – 10 August 2001
- Succeeded by: Murdo Fraser (Note: Normally, regional MSPs do not have individual predecessors and successors. However, Johnston resigned during a sitting parliament so was succeeded by Murdo Fraser.)

Personal details
- Born: 5 January 1948 (age 78) Filey, England
- Party: Scottish Conservative
- Spouse: Anna Jiménez-Olive

Paul Nicholas Johnston (born 5 January 1948) is a Scottish politician who was a Conservative Member of the Scottish Parliament (MSP) for the Mid Scotland and Fife region from May 1999, until August 2001.

== Early life ==
Paul Nicholas Johnston was born in Filey, England on 5 January 1948. He attended North Kesteven Grammar School in North Hykeham, Lincolnshire. Johnston then joined the Royal Engineers and attended Royal Military Academy Sandhurst. From 1972, he worked in the car retail industry, becoming Group Operations Director of Eastern Western Motor Group.

== Political career ==
Johnston stood as a Scottish Conservative and Unionist candidate for the Scottish Parliament in 1999, and was elected for the Mid Scotland and Fife region. At the beginning of Parliament, Johnston took the oath in Catalan. In January 2001, he wrote a letter to The Times, where he expressed disillusionment with the attitude of other politicians. An absence from Parliament began in February 2001, with an episode of pneumonia. That same year in August, he resigned, citing disillusionment with politics, and his perception of a weak party leadership as reasons for doing so.

His place in the Scottish Parliament was taken by Murdo Fraser.

Johnston was among a group of former MSPs who supported Scottish independence, saying that it would give Scotland an opportunity to "create a fairer, more equal society."
