= The Priory Academy LSST =

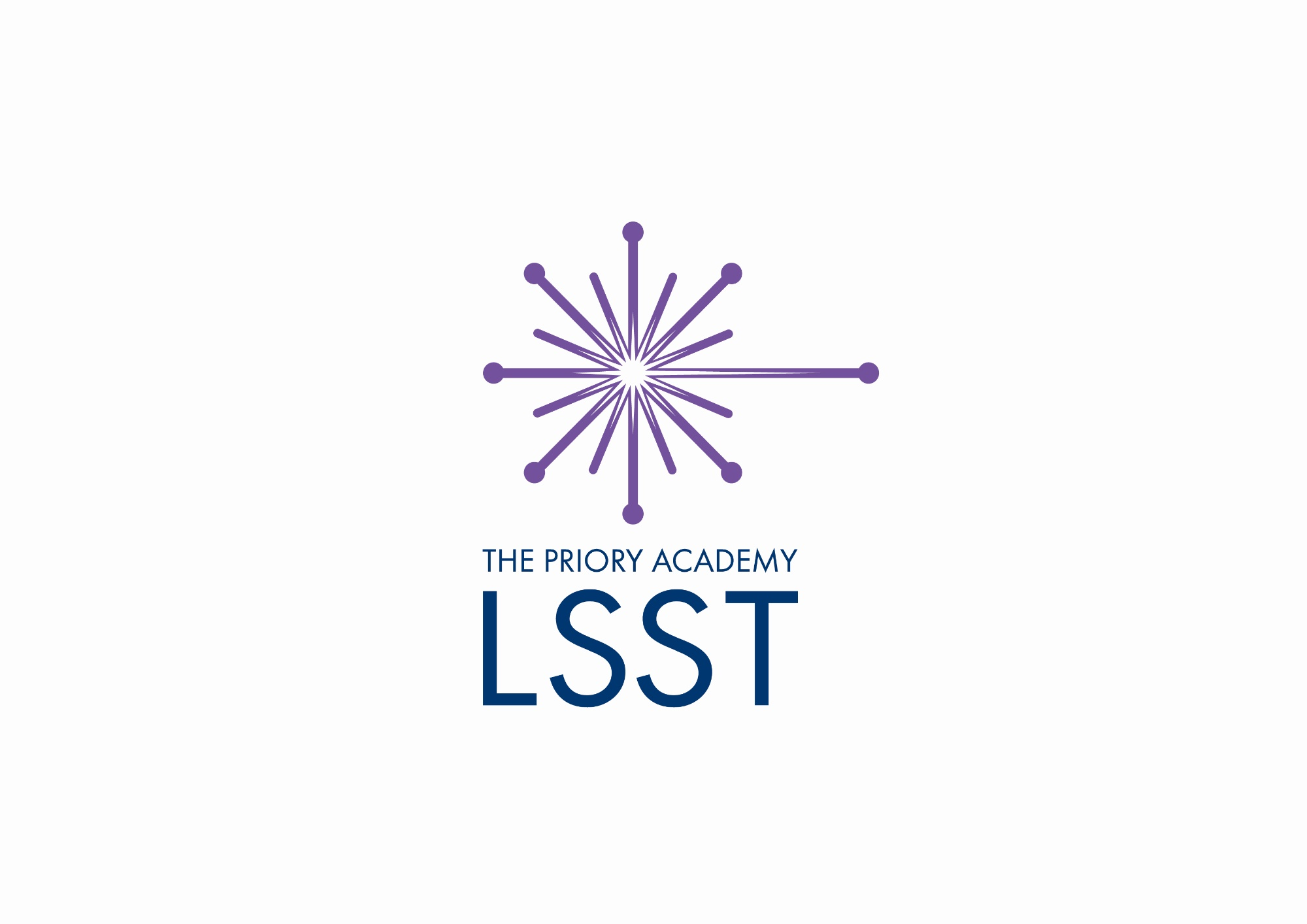
- LSST logo

Location
- Cross O'Cliff Hill; Lincoln, Lincolnshire, LN5 8PW; England
- Coordinates: 53°12′31″N 0°32′46″W

Information
- Type: Academy
- Motto: Courage and Courtesy
- Established: 1992
- Department for Education URN: 135565 Tables
- Ofsted: Reports
- Chair of governors: Glynn Johns
- Headteacher: Jane Hopkinson
- Staff: 196 (2021/2022)
- Gender: Coeducational
- Age: 11 to 19
- Enrolment: 1,770
- Houses: Sempringham, Castille, Alexandria and Avalon
- Colours: Navy blue, purple
- Website: Official website

The Priory Academy LSST (formerly the Lincoln School of Science and Technology) is a co-educational non-selective academy school and teaching school situated on Cross O'Cliff Hill, Lincoln, Lincolnshire, England. It specialises in science, technology and teaching, and is the lead school of the Lincolnshire Teaching Schools Alliance. It is also the lead member of The Priory Federation of Academies.

The Priory Academy LSST is the most over-subscribed school in Lincolnshire, the largest school on a single site in the county and one of the most popular of its kind in the country. It is the only school in the UK with its own digital planetarium.

== History ==
The school is on the site of South Park High School, which had originally opened in May 1922 as an all-girls grammar school (South Park Girls' Grammar School) for the south of the city. New buildings were added in October 1938 and extensions in 1962 and between 1974 and 1977. It became co-educational in September 1974. The school was closed on 27 July 1989 due to falling numbers. South Park had been originally intended for 200 pupils, however, by the time it closed its size had reached 900.

The school was reopened as The Lincoln School of Science and Technology in September 1992, admitting only year seven pupils in its first year, growing in size each year as a new year group joined. Its name changed at the end of 1999 to The Priory LSST, after the nearby St. Katherine's Priory.

In 2008, the school transferred to academy status under the newly formed Priory Federation of Academies, changing to its current name, The Priory Academy LSST.

== Performance ==
As of 2024, the school's most recent Ofsted inspection was in 2023, with the outcome of Good, a fall from the 2010 outcome of Outstanding.

In 2015 the Department for Education stated that the school had an 89% GCSE A*-C pass rate, a fall of 10% from 2013 (including English and Mathematics). This made it the 15th most successful school at GCSE level in the Lincolnshire Learning Authority and the top-performing school in Lincoln.

The school's Progress 8 score at GCSE in 2019 was average. The percentage of pupils entered for the English Baccalaureate was very high. The percentage of pupils attaining grade 5 or above in both English and maths GCSEs was 65%, compared to the England average of 43%.

In 2022, LSST achieved a 62% pass rate in English and Maths, this was 12% above average within England. The school has an exceptional English Baccalaureate percentage, they achieved 92% which was 53% higher than the average across English schools.

=== Headteachers ===
Term Beginning	Term End	Name
Sep 1992	Aug 1997	Frank Green
Sep 1997	Dec 2009	Richard Gilliland
Jan 2010	Aug 2016	Ian Jones
Sep 2016	present	Jane Hopkinson

The current Headteacher is Jane Hopkinson, who is also Deputy CEO of the Federation. She is a former Deputy Headteacher at the academy and Director of Student Standards for the Federation. She was also previously the Headteacher of The Priory City of Lincoln Academy before assuming the headship of LSST in September 2016, following the departure of Ian Jones to the singular role of CEO of the Federation, having previously combined the two roles.

== Campus ==
=== St. Katherine's Site ===
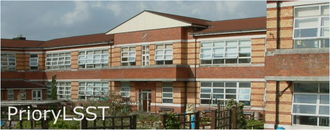
The Priory LSST Quad, as seen from the Science Section of the School.

On the main academy site there is a central garden known as the Quad, in addition to a number of individual gardens for the use of specific year groups. There are also three courts situated at the front of the school, used by year nine, ten and eleven pupils at break and lunchtime, and as a car park following the end of the school day. Behind the St. Katherine's Site there are another 2 courts for year seven and eight use for break and lunchtime. The main academy site is also the location of the 'Old Hall', where the school holds events including the annual theatre production and talent show.

Attached to the original school buildings is the academy's Department of Technology, which is based around a central concourse housing a laser cutting machine. There are workshops for woodwork, cookery, electronics, textiles, engineering and product design, as well as a robotics lab (The Mackinder Lab) opened in 2015 by MARC (Multi-Actuated Robotic Companion) from the University of Lincoln.

=== Newark Road site ===
The main site is linked to the other side of the academy by a large, covered walkway, alongside which there is the Swimming Pool, Boathouse, Pavilion (formerly containing a study room, and the Department of Psychology now containing the library and careers hub), year eleven garden, and a non-denominational multi-faith chapel which stands alongside the academy's own version of the Chartres Labyrinth. There are separate blocks housing the Department of Religious Education, Department of History, Department of Geography (Rawson Geography Centre) and Department of Music (which contains a sound-proofed recording studio). To the right of the Department of Music (when facing the entrance doors to the department building), there is a food outlet known as 'The Shed'.

At the end of the walkway, there is another building which houses the Departments of Drama and Art. The New Hall is also situated in this building, alongside the lecture theatre, gallery and a reception area for sixth form students. Just outside this building is a shooting range for the use of the academy's Combined Cadet Force (CCF).

The school has constructed a new art, music and drama block next to the Newton Centre.

=== The Priory Sports Centre ===
Facilities in the £8m centre include a 400m synthetic Olympic-standard running track outside the Sports Centre, and a 60m indoor running track integrated with a multipurpose sports hall. There are classrooms and a state of the art gymnasium, available for use by students during PE lessons and outside school hours through Priory Leisure. On 15 October 2013, The Priory Sports Centre was officially opened by Sir Matthew Pinsent CBE. There is also a rugby pitch situated on a grass bank above the running track, as well as a large field used for PE lessons and other sports events. Within the running track, there are areas for shot put, javelin and hammer throw. There is also a long-jump pit along with an inside rock climbing wall, which is used during outside school hours for clubs and other practises.

=== Robert de Cheney Boarding House ===
The Robert de Cheney Boarding House was opened in 2011 and closed in 2020 owing to the combined impact of Brexit and the COVID-19 pandemic on its financial sustainability. The academy was one of only 40 state boarding schools in England. It had 60 full-time boarding places in single, en-suite study bedrooms, and was given an outstanding rating by Ofsted in 2014.

== Curriculum ==
Pupils undergo an accelerated curriculum at Key Stage 3, and begin their GCSE courses in all subjects in Year 9 apart from English. Most students sit their Religious Education GCSE in Year 10, and the rest of their GCSEs in Year 11.

== Sixth form ==
The school has a Sixth Form of around 540 pupils. With the introduction of new, linear A Levels (with examinations taking place at the end of the course), students now study three subjects for the two years, with some limited scope for students to take a fourth subject (mainly for students taking Further Mathematics on top of Core Mathematics), as well as the opportunity to undertake an Extended Project Qualification.

Sixth Form students are able to study vocational or occupational courses at the federation's two other schools in Lincoln with sixth form provision, The Priory City of Lincoln Academy and The Priory Witham Academy. In the same way, students from those schools may study some subjects at LSST that their school does not have the capacity to offer. For example, all students studying A Levels in science subjects at the other two academy sixth forms in Lincoln take lessons at LSST.

== The LSST Alumni Association ==
The Academy established an Alumni Association in 2019.

== See also ==
- Priory City of Lincoln Academy
- The Priory Ruskin Academy
- Priory Witham Academy
- St Catherine's Priory, Lincoln
