= Education in the Falkland Islands =

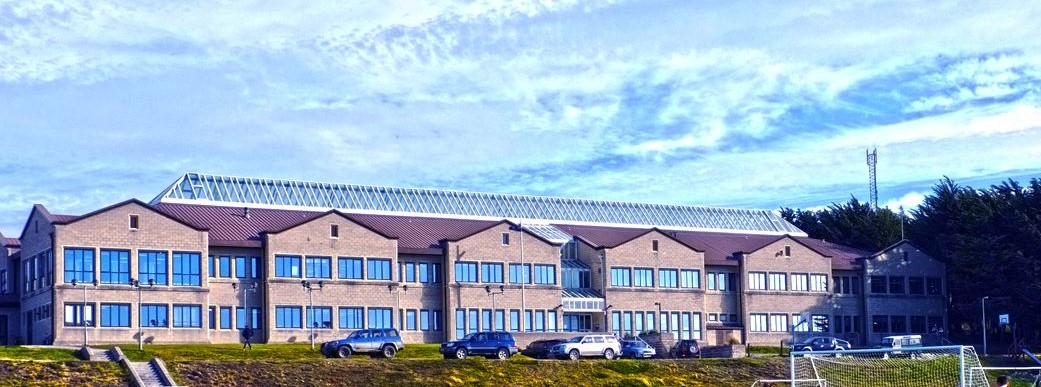
Falkland Islands Community School, the main secondary school in the Falklands.

Education in the Falkland Islands starts with childcare for babies, all the way to lifelong learning for adults. It broadly follows the English education system with Falklands local content. Most teachers are trained in the UK or other English-speaking countries. All lessons are in English, apart from Spanish which is taught from primary.

== Primary Education ==
Primary education follows the English national primary curriculum

The Infant and Junior School and Camp Education teach 3 to 11 years olds (Foundation Stage to Year 6). The Infant and Junior School is in central Stanley and is a 2 form entry primary school.

Camp Education is part of the primary school and teaches children who live in Camp (outside Stanley) and are too far away to travel to Stanley every day. There are settlement schools in Fox Bay Village and in Goose Green, both schools have a full-time teacher who teach children in a mixed-age group. Children, up to Year 5, living at farms are taught in person by a travelling teacher who stays with the family for several weeks at a time and by phone lessons with a teacher for the rest of the time.

In 2021 this Camp Education system celebrated its 125th anniversary.

There is also a primary school at RAF Mount Pleasant that mainly serves the children of members of the British armed forces.

== Secondary education ==
The Falkland Islands Community School is for secondary education for 11 to 16 year olds and uses the English National Curriculum for Key Stage 3 (11 to 14) and Key Stage 4 (14 to 16). Children take English GCSE and iGCSE exams at 16, this is a two year programme and starts at age 14. These exams are critical for progression to further education from 16 to 18. Students choose their subjects at the end of Year 9 and all students study English, maths and Science.

Camp children can board in Stanley from Year 5 to Year 11 (9 to 16 years old) so they can attend school.

== Post-16 education ==
There are no upper-secondary institutions on the Falklands, and therefore further education requires travel or distance learning. The Falkland Islands Government pays for eligible 16- to 18-year-olds to go overseas to study. This is entirely funded by the Falkland Islands, there is no assistance from the UK Government for the boarding fees and flight costs.

As of 2012 students went to England to take A-level courses at Peter Symonds College, Winchester, England (which has a boarding house named Falkland Lodge). Additionally students went to Chichester College where they were able to study National Diplomas or NVQs.

Over time this has continued to change and by in the 2010s it had become common for students to choose from a range of schools and colleges, usually in the UK but occasionally in other countries such as Gibraltar and New Zealand. Students receive funding from the Falkland Islands Government if they have permanent residency status, they are accepted onto Level 3 courses in the UK and meet other eligibility criteria.

The Falkland Islands Government also has funding schemes for higher and further education courses for over-18s. This can be distance learning or study abroad, usually in the UK, for suitably qualified students.

Many return to the Falkland Islands after they have completed their education and gained experience in their chosen field.

== Adult education ==
There is a small adult education college and training centre in Stanley, called Falkland College. It moved into a new building during 2020. It offers apprenticeships, GCSEs, NVQs and vocational courses, including via distance learning.

== Community Library ==
The College is responsible for the Christie Community Library. The library was previously at the Secondary School and moved into its new home in 2020. It is free to use for all residents of the Falkland Islands.

It is named in memory of Bill and Merle Christie, who were involved with the Falkland Islands and set up the Falkland Islands Association.

== Alumni ==
- Rob Burnett, author and journalist
- Andrea Clausen, Chief Executive Falkland Islands Government
