= North Kesteven Academy =

Location
- Moor Lane; North Hykeham, Lincolnshire, LN6 9AG; England; 53°11′11″N 0°35′50″W

Information
- Type: Academy
- Established: 1998
- Department for Education URN: 136871 Tables
- Ofsted: Reports
- Chair of Governors: Jonathan Sloan
- Headteacher: Holly Thomas
- Gender: Coeducational
- Age: 11 to 18
- Enrolment: 838
- Houses: Tennyson, Boole, Newton, Ruston, Byrd, Swift
- Colours: Teal, Silver
- Website: https://www.nkacademy.co.uk

North Kesteven Academy is a co-educational academy school on Moor Lane, off the A1434 at North Hykeham, in North Kesteven, Lincolnshire, England.

== History ==
=== Grammar school ===
The school was founded as North Kesteven Grammar School in 1961 when administered by the County of Lincoln - Parts of Kesteven Education Committee, based in Sleaford. In October 1960, at a meeting at Spitalgate, Kesteven Education Committee decided to give the new school the name North Kesteven Grammar School. In 1960 3927 children had taken the eleven-plus in Kesteven, and 510 had been chosen for grammar school education.

It moved into a new building on 5 January 1961 with 600 mixed pupils, the same day as the William Robertson School in Leadenham. The first headmaster was Mr Jack Winwood. He had been headmaster of the Sir Robert Pattinson school from 1954 to 1961. The grammar stream of this neighbouring school moved into the new grammar school.

£33,867 of buildings would be added to make the school a three-form entry, from two-form entry, from 1963. By 1966 there was 675 at the school. The deputy head from 1961 was Mr Keith Straw

In October 1967, meetings with parents about comprehensive education took place.

=== Comprehensive ===
The school became a comprehensive school in 1970, at which time it contained 1200 pupils.

From April 1974, it was administered by Lincolnshire, not Kesteven County Council. It became grant-maintained in April 1992 and a foundation school in September 1999.

A new Maths building was constructed from 1995. A sixth form complex opened in 1999, shared as the North Hykeham Joint Sixth Form.

The school was designated a specialist Arts College in performing arts in September 2000, and opened a new Arts Complex in September 2002, which included the 250-seat Terry O'Toole Theatre. The school was awarded academy status in 2010.

== School site ==
The school is adjacent to Robert Pattinson School on the west side of Moor Lane. Adjacent, on the same site to the west, is North Kesteven Leisure Centre and the Terry O'Toole Theatre.

=== Sports centre ===
The sports centre is used by the school as a gym during school hours.

The possibility of a sports centre on the site was first discussed on 19 June 1970. The sports centre was built from 1972. The sports centre was planned to open in June 1974, then planned to open in September 1974, and to be opened by Roger Bannister. It was built by Ashby & Horner of Grimsby. 60% of the cost was paid for by district council, and 40% by the county council. It cost £472,000.

The swimming pool would open first, with the lounge bar and cafeteria on 23 September 1974, followed by the two squash courts on 30 September. The director was Bill Ellingworth.

The sports hall opened in early October 1974. The centre had fourteen full-time staff. Roger Bannister, chairman of the Sports Council, officially opened the centre on 18 October 1974.

== Curriculum ==
The school has approximately 1400 pupils aged 11 to 18, and teaches towards GCSE, A Level and BTEC certificates in the fields of Technologies, Arts, History, Geography, Business Studies and Modern Foreign Languages.

== Headteachers ==
- Jack Winwood 1961 -
- Keith Straw took over in May 1973, who retired in July 1985
- Terence O’Toole from September 1985, and throughout the 1990s

== Notable former pupils ==
=== North Kesteven Grammar School ===
- Nick Johnston (1961–66), MSP for Mid Scotland and Fife from 1999 to 2001.
- David Ward, Lib Dem MP from 2010 to 2015 for Bradford East

=== North Kesteven Comprehensive School ===
- Kelly Adams - actress
- Jonathan Kerrigan - actor
- Steve Froggatt - Footballer
- Jennifer Pacey - Athlete and played 'Enigma' on the 2008 reboot of Gladiators
