= Wake knot =

Type of knot

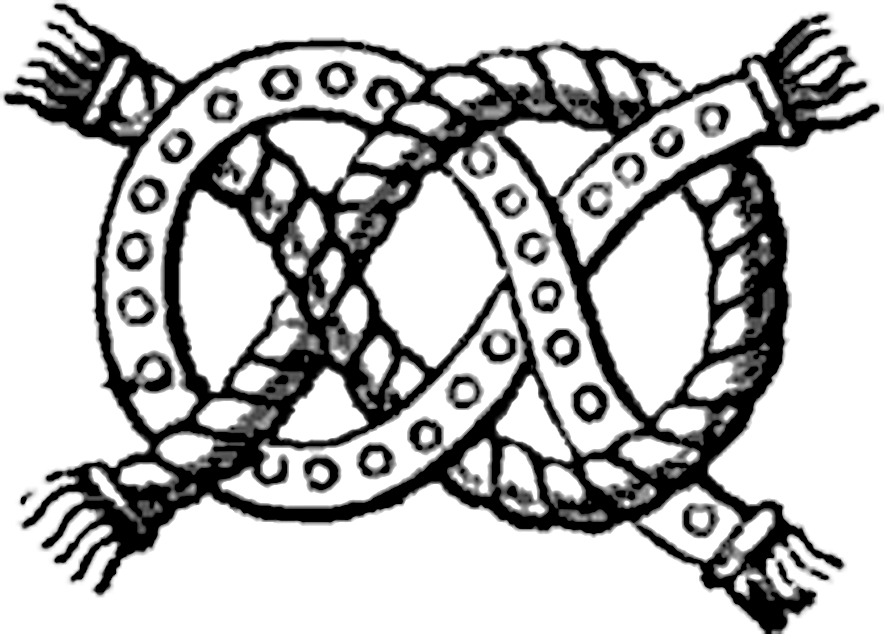
- The Wake badge.

Information
- Family: Wake family
- Region: Lincolnshire

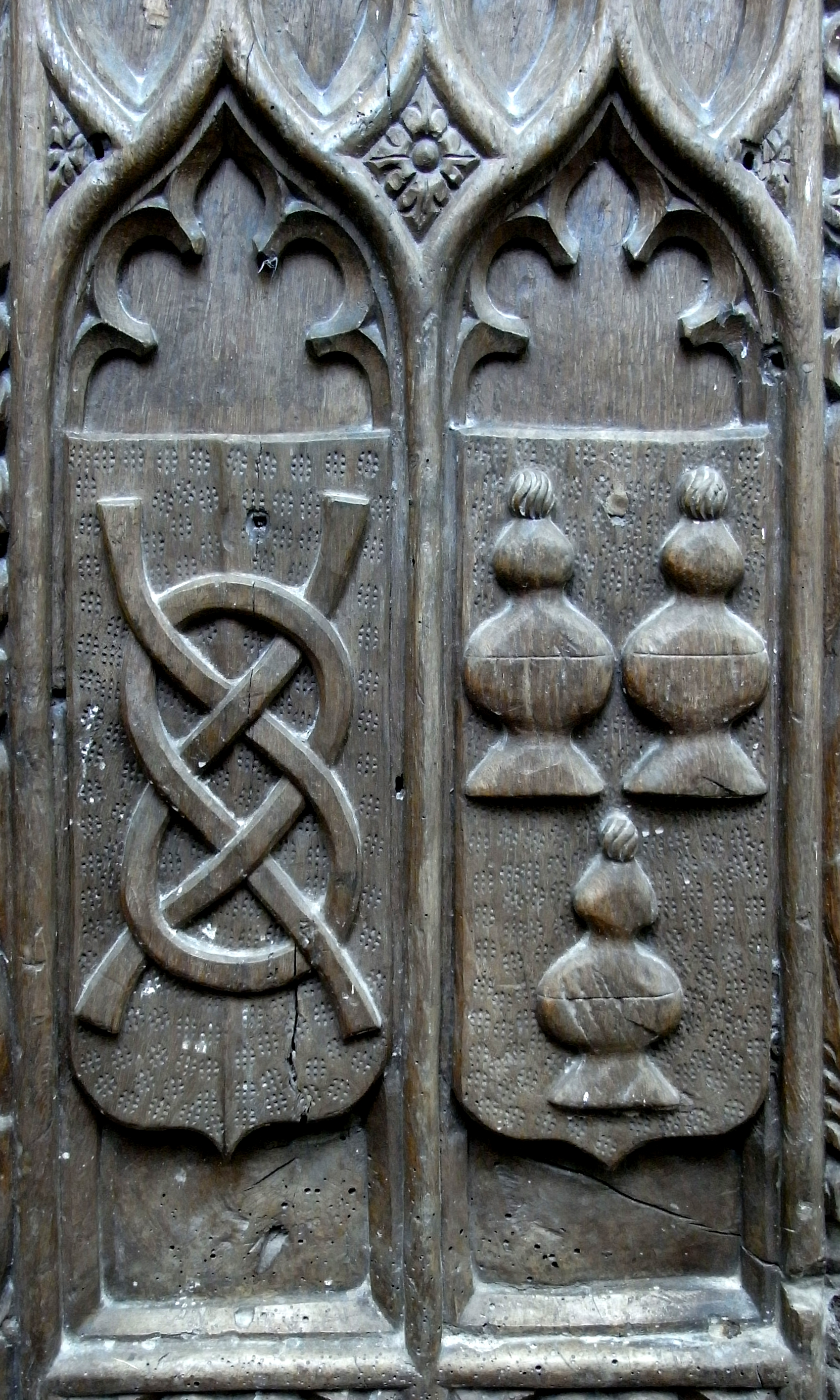
Bench end in Monkleigh Church, Devon showing the Ormonde knot and arms of Thomas Butler, 7th Earl of Ormond (c. 1426 – c. 1515): Gules, three covered cups or,

The Wake knot or Ormond knot is an English heraldic knot used historically as an heraldic badge by the Wake family, lords of the manor of Bourne in Lincolnshire and also by the Butler family, Earls of Ormond.

== Form ==
It takes the form of a Carrick bend knot connecting two ropes but the Wake knot shows the knot joining a rope and a strap.

== Usage ==
It is depicted in the coat of arms of Bourne Town Council and Bourne Academy, Lincolnshire, where the Wakes were lords of the manor.

The crest of the arms of the Isle of Ely County Council was a human hand grasping a trident around which an eel was entwined; on the wrist of the hand was a Wake knot, representing Hereward the Wake.

The crest of No. 2 Squadron RAF includes a Wake knot. Its motto is Hereward.
