= The Priory Federation of Academies Trust =

The Priory Federation of Academies
- Formation: 2008
- Founder: Richard Gilliland
- Type: Academy Trust
- Headquarters: Priory House
- Location: Cross O'Cliff Hill, Lincoln, Lincolnshire, England LN5 8PW
- Region served: Lincolnshire
- Services: Education
- Chairman: Howard Gee
- CEO: Ian Jones
- Revenue: £60m (2017/18)
- Staff: 1100 (2021)
- Website: Official website

The Priory Federation of Academies Trust is a non-profit charitable trust and the governing body for twelve academy schools in Lincolnshire and Leicestershire, England. The schools are directly funded by the Department for Education and are independent of the local authority.

== Description ==
The trust was formed in 2008 with the stated aims of "raising educational standards and improving the life chances of students in the Lincolnshire area." The Federation is run by, and is accountable to, a board of trustees including the headteachers of all the schools, a Chairman and other individuals from relevant local and national organizations. The federation currently provides education for over 7000 students and employs over 1000 staff.

== Schools ==
=== Secondary ===
- The Priory Academy LSST- the lead academy of the federation,
- The Priory Witham Academy,
- The Priory City of Lincoln Academy,
- The Priory Ruskin Academy,
- The Priory Pembroke Academy,
- The Priory Belvoir Academy,

=== Primary ===
- Ling Moor Primary Academy,
- Heighington Millfield Primary Academy
- Huntingtower Community Primary Academy
- Waddington Redwood Primary Academy,
- Cherry Willingham Primary Academy
- Willoughby Academy.

== Controversies ==
In 2012 the Education Funding Agency carried out an investigation into concerns about potential financial irregularities in the Trust. The report found that "The financial management of the Federation has not been of a standard necessary for an organisation of its current size. Regularity and transparency in the use of public funds has not been demonstrated".
