= Bourne Academy =

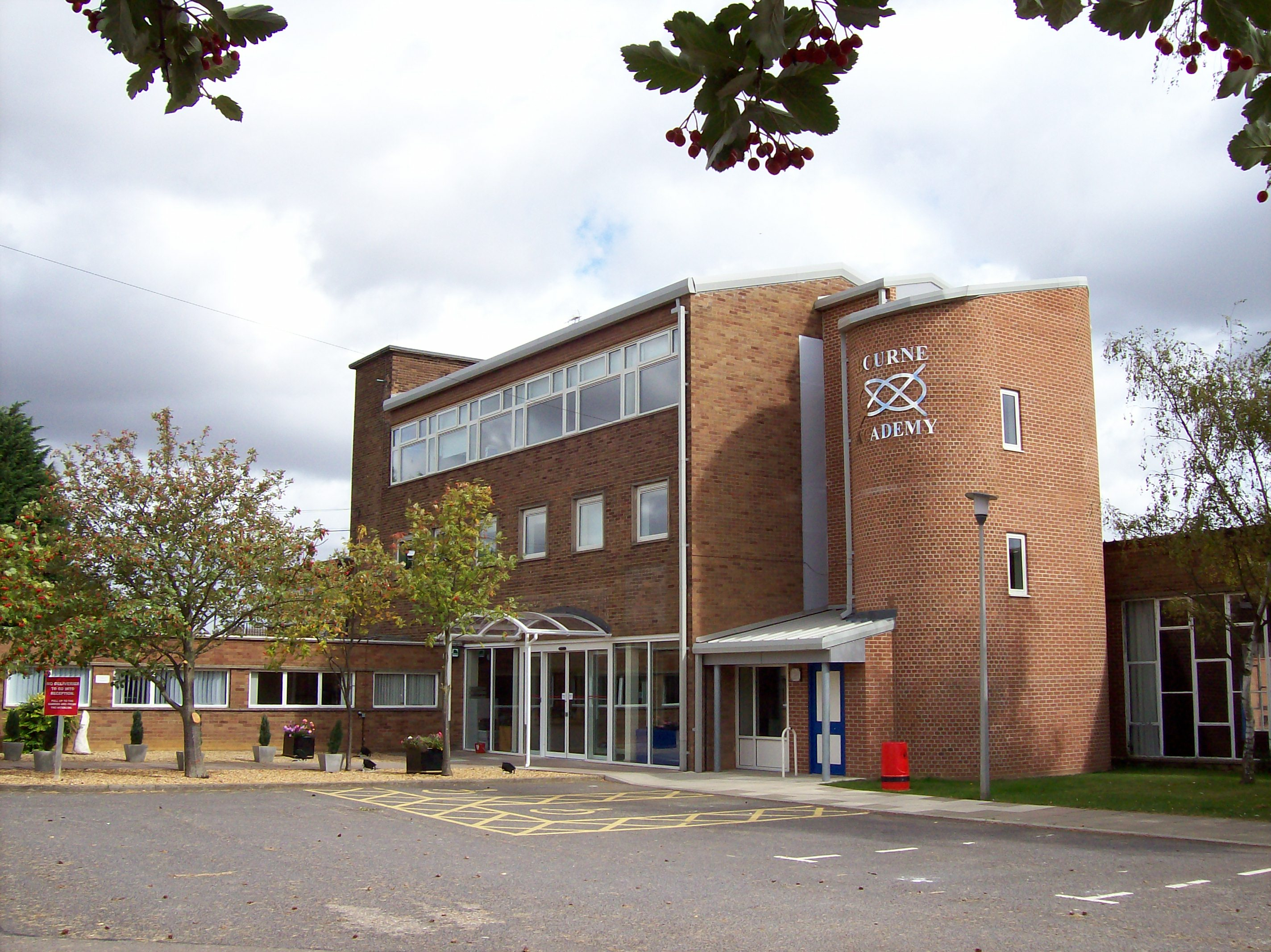

Location
- Edinburgh Crescent; Bourne, Lincolnshire, PE10 9DT; England; 52.77362°N 0.37004°W

Information
- Type: Academy
- Established: 1946
- Department for Education URN: 137572 Tables
- Ofsted: Reports
- Principal: Lucy Conley
- Gender: Co-educational
- Age: 11 to 18
- Enrolment: 1,154 pupils
- Website: https://www.bourneacademy.org

Bourne Academy is an 11 to 18 mixed comprehensive school and a co-educational academy located in Bourne, Lincolnshire, England. It is one of two secondary schools, both co-educational, in the town, the other being Bourne Grammar School. Bourne Academy is a part of the South Lincolnshire Academies Trust (SLAT), together with Spalding Academy, Spalding and Giles Academy, Boston.

Bourne Academy is situated northeast in the town, on Edinburgh Crescent, next to the Bourne Leisure Centre.

The school badge represents the Wake knot, a heraldic device referring to the Wake family, previous Lords of the Manor of Bourne, and similar to the carrick bend.

== History ==
The school was originally part of the Star Lane Board School, which is now the Bourne Abbey Primary Academy.

Following the Education Act 1944, the secondary school was divided out and moved to temporary premises at a separate site in 1946.

In July 1958, the first permanent buildings were opened at Edinburgh Crescent, the road south of the school. The school adopted the name Bourne County Secondary School.

In 1987, the name was changed to the Robert Manning School in honour of Robert Mannyng (c. 1275 – c. 1338).

The sixth form started in 1988 with only 13 students. In 1989, extension premises were opened by Kenneth Baker, Secretary of State for Education. In 1999, the school attained Technology College status and the name changed again, to Robert Manning Technology College.

=== Specialist school ===
In January 2007, it was announced that, in recognition of its excellence, the school had been invited by the government to apply to take on a second speciality in Vocational Education, and that its application was successful. Due to the school's new speciality, the Governors decided to change the name once more, to the Robert Manning College.

=== Academy ===
Following a successful application, Robert Manning Technology College converted to academy status on 1 January 2012, becoming Bourne Academy.

== See also ==
- List of schools in the East Midlands
- Bourne Grammar School
- St. George's College of Technology, a similar school in Sleaford
