= Forum, North Hykeham =

Suburb and ward of North Hykeham in Lincolnshire, England

Coordinates: 53.194455°N 0.581302°W

Forum
- Ward and Suburb
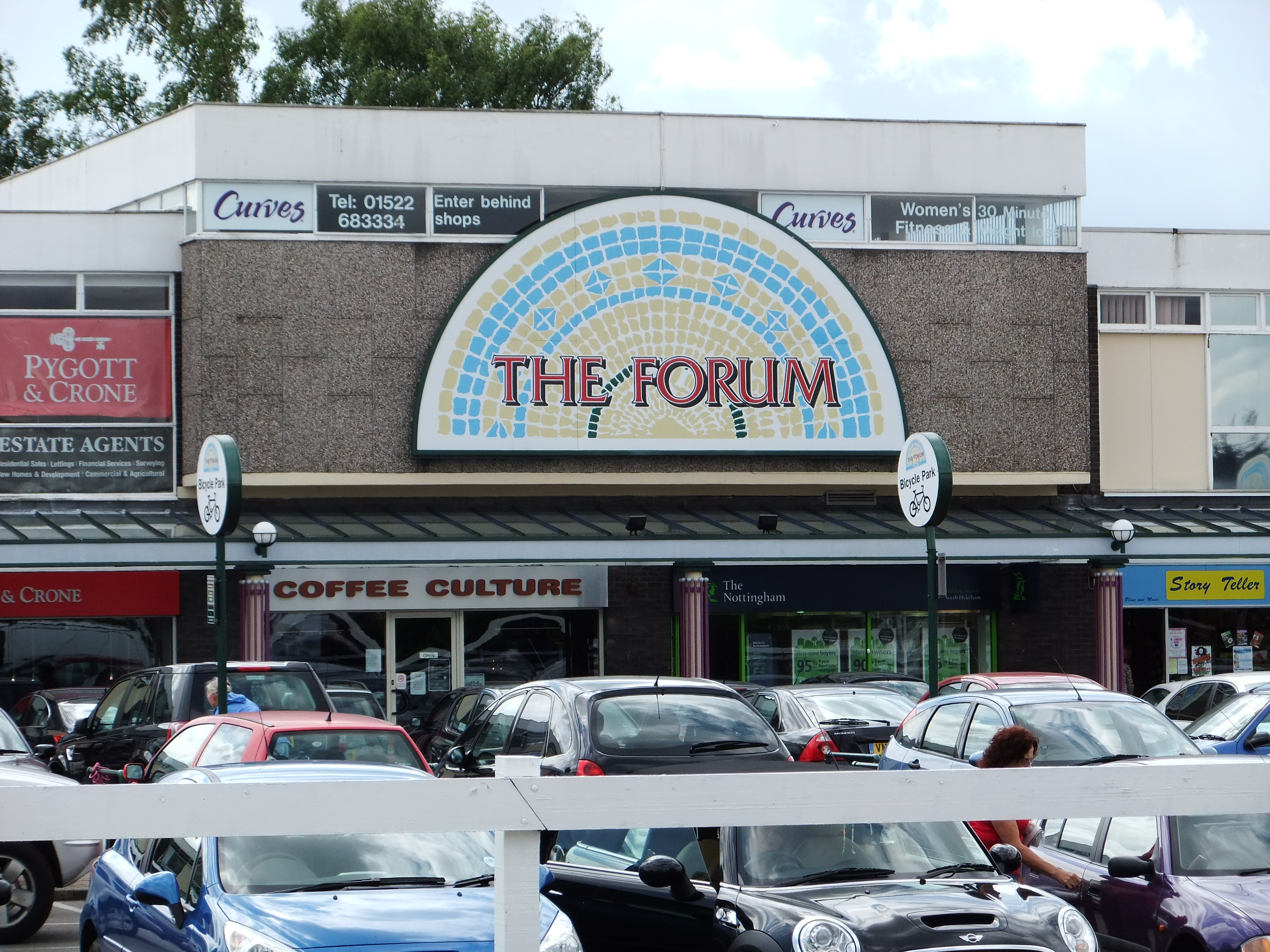
- The Forum Shopping Centre, North Hykeham

- Location within Lincolnshire
- Population: 1,838 (2021 Census Ward Profile)
  - London: 156 mi (251 km) S
- Civil parish: North Hykeham
- District: North Kesteven
- Shire county: Lincolnshire
- Region: East Midlands
- Country: England
- Sovereign state: United Kingdom
- Post town: Lincoln
- Postcode district: LN6
- Dialling code: 01522
- Police: Lincolnshire
- Fire: Lincolnshire
- Ambulance: East Midlands
- UK Parliament: Sleaford and North Hykeham

Forum is a suburb and ward of North Hykeham in Lincolnshire, England. It is one of the six wards of North Hykeham Town Council. It had a population of 1,838 at the 2021 census.

== Geography ==
The ward encompasses the northeastern part of the town and borders the Lincoln district and its suburbs of Moorland, Swallowbeck and Witham.

== Demographics ==
At the 2021 census, the ward profile population was 1,838. Of the findings, the ethnicity and religious composition of the ward was:

Forum: Ethnicity: 2021 Census
Ethnic group	Population	%
White	1,799	97.9%
Asian or Asian British	17	0.9%
Mixed	17	0.9%
Black or Black British	3	0.1%
Other Ethnic Group	2	0.1%
Total	1,838	100%

The religious composition of the ward at the 2021 Census was recorded as:

Forum: Religion: 2021 Census
Religious	Population	%
Christian	1,029	58.9%
Irreligious	700	40%
Other religion	6	0.3%
Jewish	4	0.2%
Hindu	3	0.1%
Buddhist	3	0.2%
Muslim	2	0.1%
Sikh	1	0.1%
Total	1,838	100%
