= David Hayden (RAF airman) =

David Hayden MC
- Born: David James Hayden c. 1979 (age 46–47); Germany
- Military career
- Allegiance: United Kingdom
- Branch: Royal Air Force
- Service years: 1997–present
- Rank: Sergeant
- Unit: RAF Regiment
- Conflicts: War in Afghanistan; Iraq War
- Awards: Military Cross

David James Hayden, MC (born c. 1979) is the first Royal Air Force non-commissioned officer to be awarded the Military Cross.

== Early life ==
Hayden was born in Germany and attended the Gleed Boys' School in Spalding, where he grew up. His father (who died in June 2005, aged 49) was a tank driver in the Queen's Royal Hussars, becoming a warrant officer class 2.

== RAF service ==
Hayden joined the RAF Regiment in 1997 and after a number of tours including time with No. 2 RAF Force Protection Wing at RAF Leeming – with which he served in Afghanistan for the first time – he is currently a sergeant. He is a qualified instructor.

While serving in Iraq in 2007, as part of No. 4 RAF Force Protection Wing (of which 1 Squadron is a sub-unit), he showed outstanding courage while commanding a dismounted patrol in a fight against an insurgent force, repeatedly risking his own life to rescue a wounded comrade and extract his team. His Military Cross was gazetted on 7 March 2008.
