= Cherry Willingham =

Village and civil parish in Lincolnshire, England

Coordinates: 53.242593°N 0.453191°W

- Village and Civil Parish
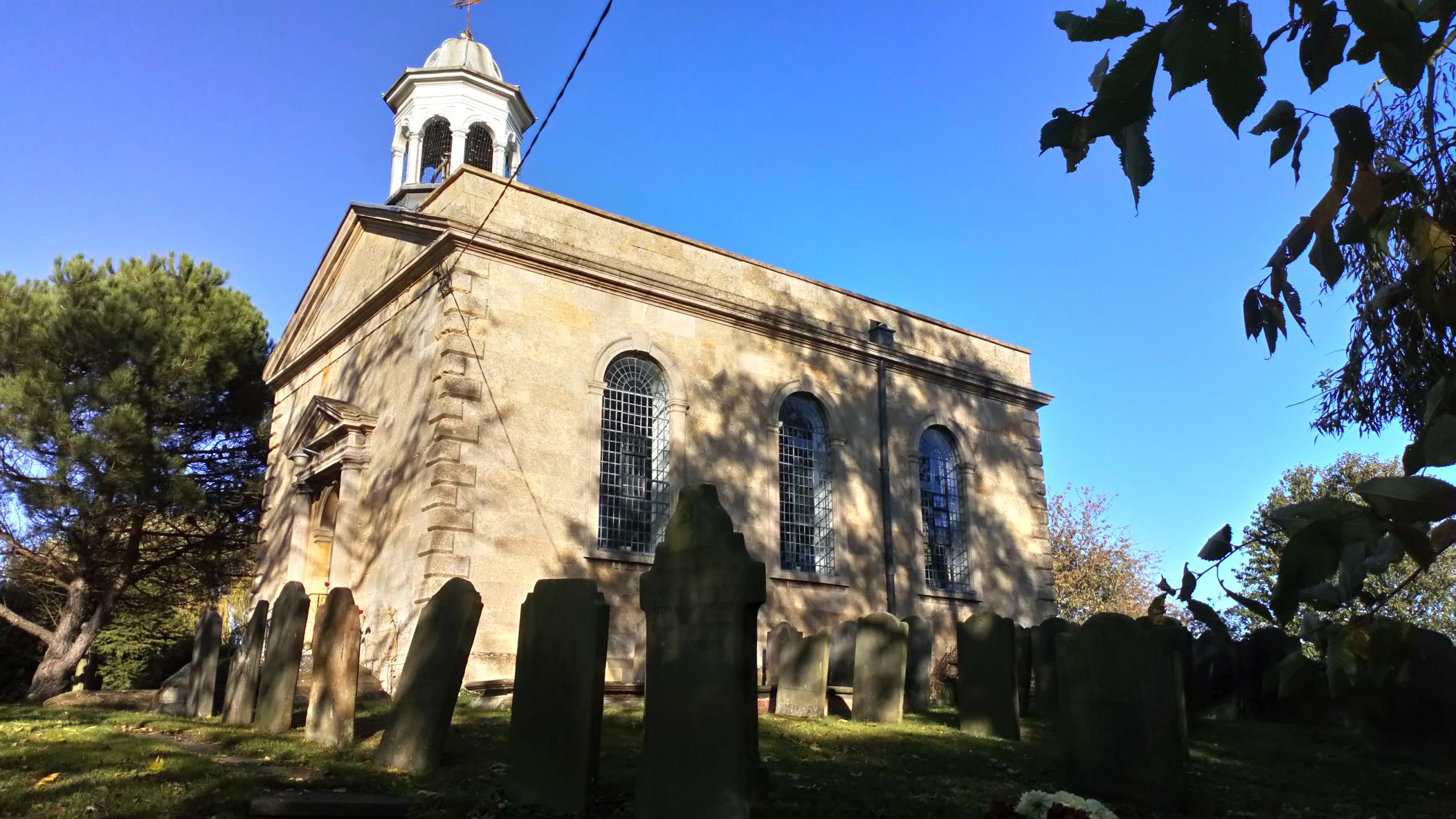
- St Peter’s Church

- Location within Lincolnshire
- Population: 3,501 (2011)
- OS grid reference: TF033728
  - London: 120 mi (190 km) S
- District: West Lindsey
- Shire county: Lincolnshire
- Region: East Midlands
- Country: England
- Sovereign state: United Kingdom
- Post town: Lincoln
- Postcode district: LN3
- Dialling code: 01522
- Police: Lincolnshire
- Fire: Lincolnshire
- Ambulance: East Midlands
- UK Parliament: Gainsborough

Cherry Willingham is a large village and civil parish in the West Lindsey district of Lincolnshire, England. The population at the 2011 census was 3,506. It is situated approximately 4 miles (6 km) east from Lincoln. Neighbouring villages are Reepham, Nettleham and Fiskerton.

The village is twinned with the French village Le Grand-Lucé.

The village has two schools, Cherry Willingham Primary School and the Priory Pembroke Academy, shopping centre, library, surgery, two pubs, a church and a chapel.
