= Gleed Girls' Technology College =

Secondary school in Spalding, Lincolnshire, England

Location
- Neville Avenue; Spalding, Lincolnshire, PE11 2EJ; England
- Coordinates: 52°47′12″N 0°08′14″W

Information
- Type: Secondary
- Established: 1941
- Closed: 2011
- Department for Education URN: 120712 Tables
- Ofsted: Reports
- Gender: Mixed
- Age: 11 to 16
- Website: gleed.lincs.sch.uk

Gleed Girls' Technology College was a secondary school on Neville Avenue in Spalding, Lincolnshire, England. It opened on 28 April 1941 as Spalding The Gleed Senior Council School and comprised boys' and girls departments which from 1946 were regarded as separate schools under the same management. From October 1946 to 1948 the two schools were known as Spalding Gleed Secondary Modern Schools. From October 1948 until at least 1974 they were again regarded as separate departments of the school which was known as Spalding Gleed County Secondary School. It became a Specialist Technology College in 2001. From September 2009 it was a combined Technology and Applied Learning Specialist College. The headteacher was Mrs Janet Daniels (previously at The Maltings Academy, Essex). The school's commitment to its staff was recognised by its redesignation as an Investors in People establishment.

In 2011 the boys' and girls' schools amalgamated and became the Sir John Gleed School.

The girls' school achieved considerable publicity when an email sent by a member of staff to a parent was placed into the public domain. The email was stated to contain 14 spelling or grammar errors. The incident was covered by national newspapers and TV.

In September 2012 the school became a mixed school.

== See also ==
- Gleed Boys' School
