= Old Leake =

Village and civil parish in Lincolnshire, England

Coordinates: 53.031924°N 0.097341°E

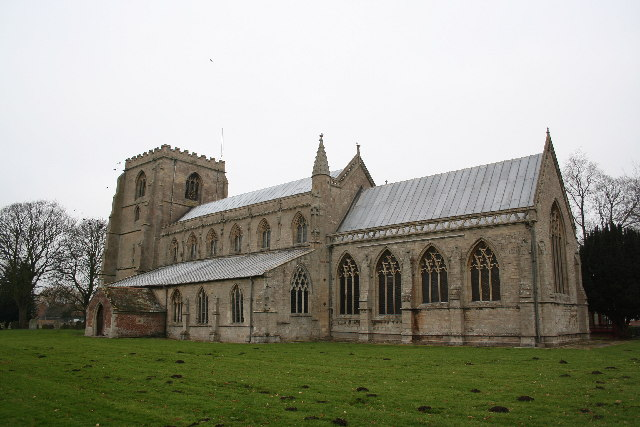
- St Mary's Church, Old Leake

- Location within Lincolnshire
- Population: 2,022 (2011)
- OS grid reference: TF407503
  - London: 105 mi (169 km) S
- Civil parish: Old Leake
- District: Boston
- Shire county: Lincolnshire
- Region: East Midlands
- Country: England
- Sovereign state: United Kingdom
- Post town: Boston
- Postcode district: PE22
- Dialling code: 01205
- Police: Lincolnshire
- Fire: Lincolnshire
- Ambulance: East Midlands
- UK Parliament: Boston and Skegness

Old Leake is a village and civil parish in the Boston district, in the county of Lincolnshire, England. The population of the civil parish at the 2011 census was 2,022.

Old Leake is situated approximately 8 miles (13 km) north-east from Boston, and on the A52 road between Leverton and Wrangle at the junction of the B1184 (from Sibsey). Areas included in the parish are The Gride to the north-west, Leake Commonside and Lade Bank to the north, and Leake Hurns End to the south-east. The coast of The Wash lies 3 miles (5 km) to the east of the village.

== Geography ==
Old Leake is one of eighteen parishes which, together with Boston, form the borough of Boston in the county of Lincolnshire, England. The local government has been arranged in this way since the reorganisation of 1 April 1974, which resulted from the Local Government Act 1972. This parish forms part of the Old Leake and Wrangle electoral ward.

Hitherto, the parish had formed part of Boston Rural District, in the Parts of Holland. Holland was one of the three divisions (formally known as parts) of the traditional county of Lincolnshire. Since the Local Government Act 1888, Holland had been in most respects, a county in itself.

== Community ==
The parish church is a Grade I listed building dedicated to St Mary, and dating from the 12th century, with the chancel being restored in 1875 by Temple Moore. There is a 15th-century alms box The lychgate is Grade II listed and may have been built by Temple Moore.

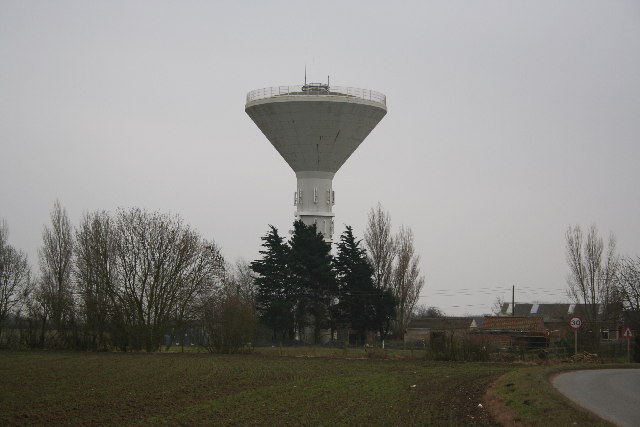
Water tower at Old Leake

Howsams Mill, built in 1859, is a Grade II listed building at Leake Commonside.

A water tower of Swedish design was erected in 1966.

The village public houses are the White Hart on Church Road and the Bricklayer's Arms on Wainfleet Road (A52). There is a National Health Service doctors' surgery, Old Leake Medical Centre, which takes patients from Old Leake and the surrounding villages, including Eastville, Wrangle, Friskney, Leverton, Butterwick, Freiston, Sibsey and Fishtoft.

Giles Academy, a secondary school with sixth form, is on Church End. Old Leake Primary School is on Old Main Road.

=== Lade Bank Pumping Station ===
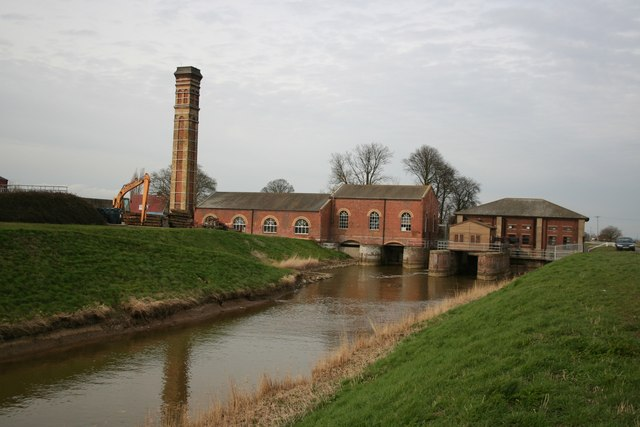
Lade Bank Pumping Station

Lade Bank lock was built on the Hobhole Drain in 1805 by John Rennie and 1867 the Lade Bank pumping station was built of red and yellow brick. Originally a lock of four cutwaters and two abutments with grooves and fixings for lock gates. In 1867 an engine house and pumping station with tall chimney were built above. The engine house contained six boilers to raise the steam to operate the two pumps. It was replaced by a modern station of 1936 also partly built on the original lock bases.

=== Population ===
Population of Leake Civil Parish
Year	1801	1811	1821	1831	1841	1851	1881	1891
Population	911	922	1,417	1,744	1,859	2,062	2,120	1,962

Population of Old Leake Civil Parish
Year	1901	1911	1921	1931	1941	1961	2001
Population	1,387	1,340	1,438	1,492	1,614	1,557	1,803
