= Gleed Boys' School =

Secondary school for boys aged 11 to 16, in Spalding, Lincolnshire, England

Location
- Halmer Gardens; Spalding, Lincolnshire, PE11 2EF; England
- Coordinates: 52°47′10″N 0°08′21″W

Information
- Type: Secondary Modern
- Motto: We believe we will achieve
- Established: 1941; 85 years ago
- Closed: 2011; 15 years ago
- Local authority: Lincolnshire
- Specialist: Humanities College
- Department for Education URN: 120641 Tables
- Ofsted: Reports
- Staff: 40
- Gender: Boys
- Age: 11 to 16
- Enrolment: 650 approx
- Publication: The Gleed Boys' School Newsletter
- Website: http://www.gleedboys.lincs.sch.uk/

Gleed Boys' School was a secondary school for boys aged 11 to 16, in Spalding, Lincolnshire, England.

The school has been merged with Gleed Girls' Technology College to form Sir John Gleed School, a co-educational secondary school with separate but conjoined campus buildings, one for boys and one for girls.

== History ==
Sir John Wilson Gleed, M.A., J.P. (1865–1946) was Chairman of the Holland Education Committee and of Holland County Council. He was knighted for political and public service by King George VI on 13 June 1939. Two Spalding schools (one for boys, one for girls) were named after him.

The school was originally built as a hospital, but never opened as such, instead being partitioned to become two schools. It was opened on 28 April 1941 as Spalding The Gleed Senior Council School, and comprised boys' and girls departments which from 1946 were regarded as separate schools under the same management. From October 1946 to 1948 the two schools were known as Spalding Gleed Secondary Modern Schools. From October 1948 to at least 1974 they were again regarded as separate departments of the school, which was known as Spalding Gleed County Secondary School.

The two schools were then managed separately as Spalding Gleed Boys' School (known as Spalding Sir John Gleed Technology School prior to September 1999) and Spalding The Gleed Girls' CAL & Technology College (known as Spalding The Gleed Girls' School prior to September 2001).

The last headteacher, Geoff Cowley, ran a school of approximately 40 teachers plus support staff. There were 5 forms in each of years 7 to 11, with a total pupil body of 650. The school had qualified for specialist status and was a Humanities College.

The County Council decided to close Gleed Boys' school from November 2011 and to reunite the two Gleed schools. This followed an earlier decision to close a nearby secondary school, St Guthlac's in Crowland.

== Curriculum ==
Gleed Boys' School offered academic and vocational programmes for boys aged 11 to 16 years.

Key Stage 3 courses included English, Mathematics, Science, Art, Geography, History, Physical Education, Religious Education, Information and Communication Technology (ICT), Design & Technology (D & T) courses (including Food Technology), French and PHSE (Personal Health and Social Education). Key stage 4 courses included GCSEs in English Language, English Literature, Mathematics and Statistics and Sciences.

The school curriculum also provided for Art, BTEC Science, Drama, Geology, Geography, History, Citizenship, Media Studies, Modern Languages, Music, Psychology, Religious Education, and Horticulture.

=== Sport ===
Football, PE, hockey, volleyball and games lessons used an astroturf pitch next to the school playing field. Rugby and cricket were played on the school playing field, which included a running track and long jump sand pit. Gymnastics were held in the gymnasium; the school also provided a fitness suite.

Spalding Hockey Club teams used the astroturf pitch for training.

== Extra-curricular activities ==
The Science department organised activities including an after-school 'Science & Technology' club. The PE department organised sports activities, and inter-school events such as cross country, football, rugby and cricket.

== Notable alumni ==
- David Hayden MC, first member of the RAF Regiment to get the Military Cross.

== See also ==
- Gleed Girls' Technology College – on the same campus.
