= Sir William Robertson Academy =

Location
- Main Road; Welbourn, Lincoln, Lincolnshire, LN5 0PA; England; 53.067°N 0.566°W

Information
- Type: Academy
- Motto: No borders, just horizons
- Religious affiliation: None
- Established: 1961
- Department for Education URN: 138839 Tables
- Ofsted: Reports
- Headteacher: Scott Barlow
- Staff: 113
- Gender: Mixed
- Age: 11 to 18
- Houses: Robertson; Windrush; Attenborough; Seacole
- Website: http://www.swracademy.org/

Sir William Robertson Academy (formerly Sir William Robertson High School) is a coeducational secondary school of around 1000 pupils, situated in Welbourn, near Lincoln, Lincolnshire, England. The school is sited on a former WWII munitions dump for the nearby Wellingore Aerodrome.

The school used to specialise languages and taught French, Spanish and German, but now only French is taught. From September 2012 the school has catered for students aged 11 to 18. The school also achieved its best ever GCSE results in 2008.

The school has four houses, each with a differently coloured tie: Seacole (yellow), Windrush (red), Robertson (blue) and Attenborough (green).

== History ==
=== Secondary modern school ===
Sir William Robertson Academy is named after Field Marshal William Robertson, born in Welbourn, who served in the First World War.

The school was to open as Leadenham County Secondary Modern School. The name change to William Robertson took place on Wednesday 30 November 1960, at a meeting of Kesteven Education Committee in Sleaford.

It opened on 5 January 1961, with HORSA buildings. The first head was educated in Grantham, who was a flight lieutenant in the RAF during the war. It was officially opened on Tuesday 17 October 1961 by Brian Robertson, 1st Baron Robertson of Oakridge. The school was to be built for 450 children.

The school was to be three form entry. There were new buildings in the mid-1960s. The school was to cost £74,767. The deputy headteacher, Mr Padgett, became the first headteacher of the new secondary modern at Billinghay, in 1963. From September 1964 it worked with Grantham College to teach commercial subjects for one day a week.

Evening courses were taught, which was later known as the Welbourn Adult Education Centre, later run by John Halpin. In 1971 there were 350 at the school.

=== Comprehensive ===
It became a comprehensive in September 1975. Comprehensive schools were discussed in 1969 and 1970, but not everyone agreed. It was proposed that the school could become a 11-18 coeducational comprehensive school, with 1,000 children.

By August 1977 the headteacher was facing accusations from Leadenham parish council that schoolchildren were 'educationally deprived'. Parents were looking at moving their children to different schools. The school offered seven A-level courses, two of which were 'academic'. For the first four years, it was not comprehensive, by intake.

In 1977 one of the school governors was Mrs Jean Wootton of Horbling, the chairman of the education committee of the county council.

The school was given permission in January 1980 to establish an experimental sixth form, for four years. The first set of O-level exams taken by a comprehensive intake were taken in 1980.

In 1985 closure of the school was discussed, due to low numbers attending.

There were 380 at the school in 1989. In June 1990 it built a replica Iron Age mud hut, overseen by History teacher Tony Sanderson. In January 1991 it formed a company Welro Engineering, to make working models of engineering parts.

The school became grant maintained in September 1993, after parents were balloted in October 1992. On Wednesday 4 November 1992 the school was filmed by the BBC for the 'North of Westminster' series, broadcast on November 8, 1992, in connection with grant-maintained status.

In 1993 there were 326 at the school. Only 40 children entered the school in 1992, it was typically around 66.

It became an academy in October 2012.

=== Buildings ===
Buildings were to be added in 1963, to cost £57,100. In 1964 a £82,000 extension was planned for 1967-68.

In February 1972 a £70,000 contract began, to build a two-storey classroom block, for the raising of the school leaving age to 16. The 5-acre former site was sold in 1978.

A cafeteria system of school meals began on October 1, 1980, but the county council looked at closing the meals service in 1981.

In August 1987, the district council agreed to a new sports centre being built, which would not be joint-use for the local community. Construction started in late 1987, built by William Wright & Sons of Lincoln. Completion of the sport centre was expected by December 1988, costing £298,000, and officially opened in March 1989 by William Wyrill, the leader of the county council.

== Sixth form ==
In June 1985 it was decided to close the sixth form, from September 1986, due to low numbers.

From 1986, most people after 16 went to the Sleaford Joint Sixth Form. At age 16 people, with adequate O-level results, would often choose to go to the grammar schools in Sleaford (Sleaford Joint Sixth Form) or Grantham, both of which had a far better known academic reputation, and also offered a wider choice of A-levels. As a result, the school sixth form was probably unfortunately doomed from day one.

In March 1994, with only 370 at the school, the school planned to re-open a sixth form for September 1995. The Priory LSST was also taking many children from the Welbourn and Navenby areas from 1992.

In early 1999 construction work began in a £750,000 block, which was hoped could lead to a sixth form again being established.

The sixth form was re-established in 2012.

== Headteachers ==
- Arthur James Aveling, retired July 1970, after 9 years; he died in Kirkby Lonsdale in August 1986 aged 76
- c.1985, Mrs Judith B Crowe until December 1992, moved to the Falkland Islands Community School in January 1993
- January 1993, Ian Wright

== Sport ==
The school took part in the Grantham and District Schools football competition, from the early 1980s.

== Visits ==
On the evening of Friday March 11, 1983 employment secretary Norman Tebbit spoke at the school, as the guest of the Grantham Conservative Association. In Mr Tebbit's speech at the school, he did not hold back in his remarks about other political parties.

== Notable former pupils ==
- Farren Blackburn, film and TV director (1980–85)
- Morgan Whittaker, professional football player (2012-17)
