= Reepham, Lincolnshire =

Village in Lincolnshire, England

Coordinates: 53.249989°N 0.446045°W

Reepham
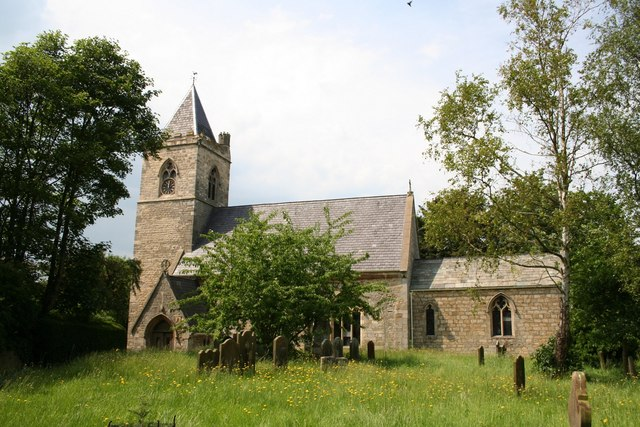
- Church of St Peter and St Paul, Reepham

- Location within Lincolnshire
- Population: 915 (2011)
- OS grid reference: TF037736
  - London: 120 mi (190 km) S
- District: West Lindsey
- Shire county: Lincolnshire
- Region: East Midlands
- Country: England
- Sovereign state: United Kingdom
- Post town: Lincoln
- Postcode district: LN3
- Dialling code: 01522
- Police: Lincolnshire
- Fire: Lincolnshire
- Ambulance: East Midlands
- UK Parliament: Gainsborough

Reepham is a small village in the West Lindsey district of Lincolnshire, England. It is situated 5 miles (8.0 km) north-east from the city and county town of Lincoln. Village population is approximately 1,250, reducing to 915 at the 2011 census.

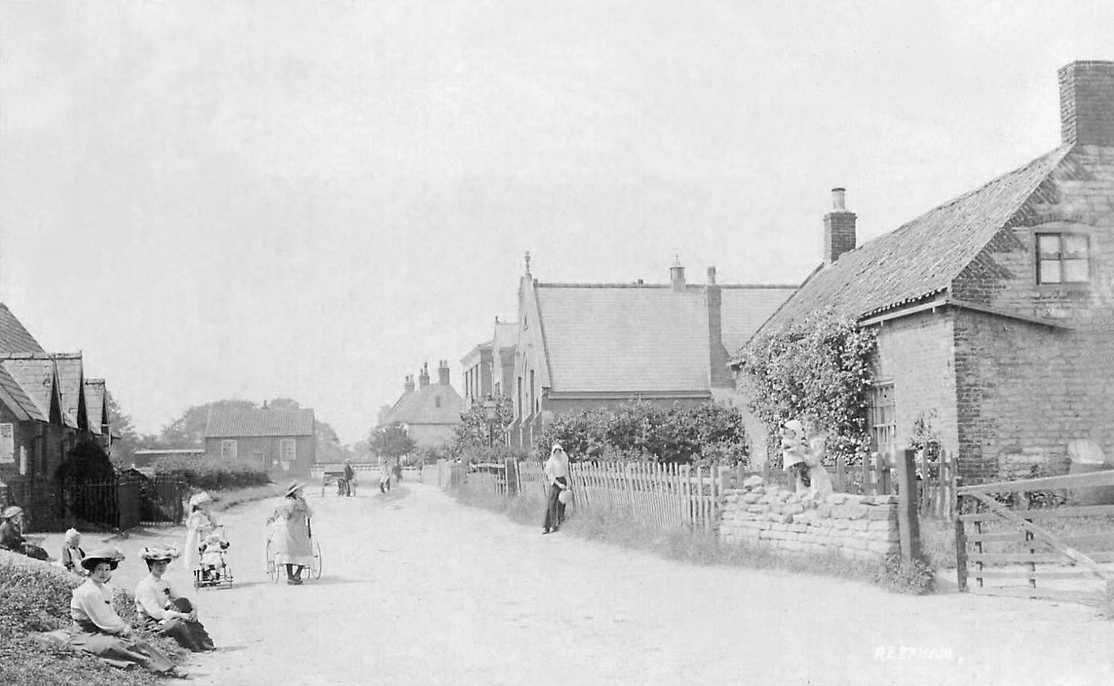
Reepham, c.1909

The village shop is a Post Office, general store and newsagents. There is also a primary school, a Church of England church (St Peter and St Paul), Methodist chapel, and a public house, The Fox and Hounds Inn. The village shares its village hall with neighbouring Cherry Willingham, and Priory Pembroke Academy in that village is the local secondary school. There is a cricket club in the village.

A regular bus service provided by the Stagecoach in Lincolnshire (previously Lincolnshire Road Car Company) links the village to Lincoln and the neighbouring villages of Fiskerton and Cherry Willingham. The parliamentary constituency is Gainsborough, where the current MP is Edward Leigh (Conservative).

Although the centre of the village contains very old properties there has been expansion in recent years and in-fill with new houses and bungalows.

The village previously contained a Co-op store, police station, a second pub The Chequers, doctors' surgery and Reepham railway station, but all have closed. The railway still passes through the village on the Lincoln/Market Rasen/Cleethorpes line.

The village has a parish council, the lowest level of local government.
