= Falkland Islands Community School =

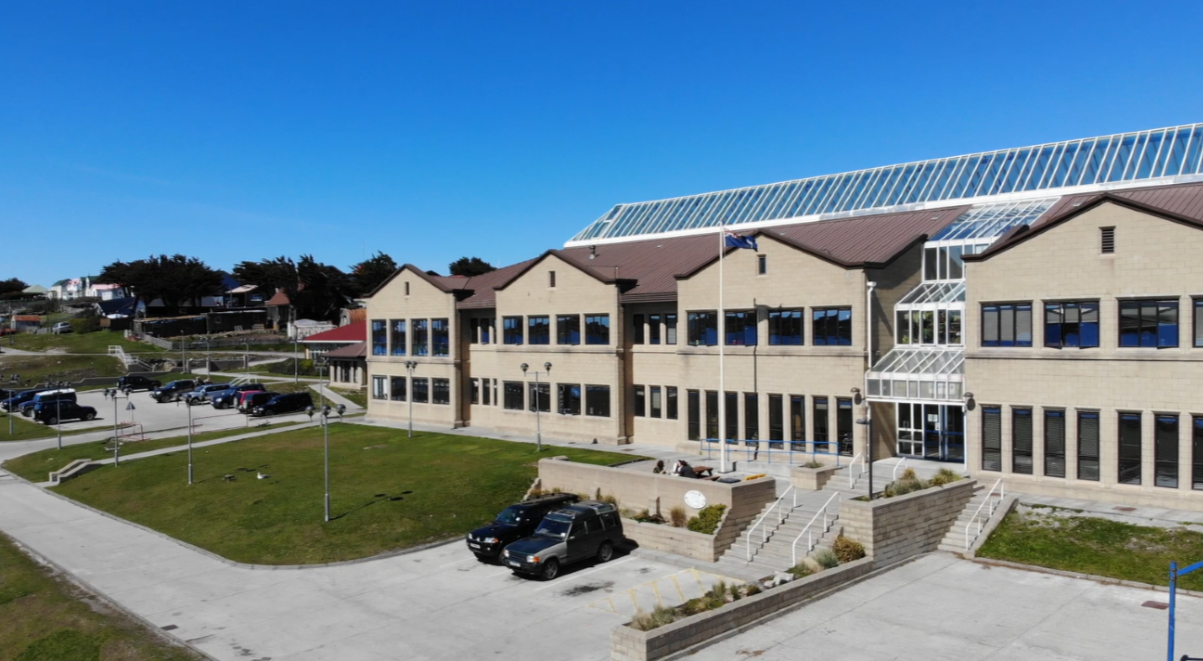
- Falkland Islands Community School, 2019

Location
- Reservoir Road; Stanley, FIQQ 1ZZ; Falkland Islands; 51.693005°S 57.872093°W

Information
- Other name: FICS
- Type: Secondary school
- Established: 1992
- Local authority: Falkland Islands Government
- Principal: Amy Marsh
- Gender: Mixed
- Age range: 11–16
- Houses: Shackleton, Ross, Scott
- Website: www.secondary.ac.fk

Falkland Islands Community School (FICS) is an 11–16 mixed secondary school in Stanley, Falkland Islands. It was established in 1992 and is next to the Falkland Islands Leisure Centre.

FICS delivers 11-16 education, following the English National Curriculum. At 16 children take up to 9 GCSEs. All teachers are qualified in line with English DfE requirements for teachers and are experienced in teaching in the British education system.

The school is completely inclusive, as it is the only secondary school on the islands. SEND education is provided for children who need more tailored support.

Outdoor education is a key part of the curriculum, with a range of activities offered in Year 9 and hill-walking as part of the PE GCSE. Students can also take part in the Duke of Edinburgh Award scheme.

Art is a strength in the school and across the islands and the annual Susan Whitley art exhibition gives every student the chance to exhibit their work to the community.

Careers lessons and advice are provided by the Careers team from Falkland College to all year groups, to help students understand the options open to them and careers in the islands. Careers work is supported by employers from across the islands and there is an annual careers day which all secondary children participate in.

For upper secondary education from 16 to 18, young people can study A-levels or other Level 3 qualifications in UK schools and colleges and are sponsored by Falkland Islands Government to cover accommodation and travel costs.

== History ==
The first headteacher was Mrs Judith Crowe, from the Sir William Robertson School in Lincolnshire.

== Facilities ==
Stanley House - Secondary school children who live on farms or in settlements that are more than 30 minutes drive from Stanley are weekly or full time boarders at Stanley House.

The school shares sporting facilities with the Leisure Centre. These include a large indoor sports hall and a 25-meter (82 ft) swimming pool.

The school is well equipped with science labs, food technology and design and technology workshops.

== Gallery ==
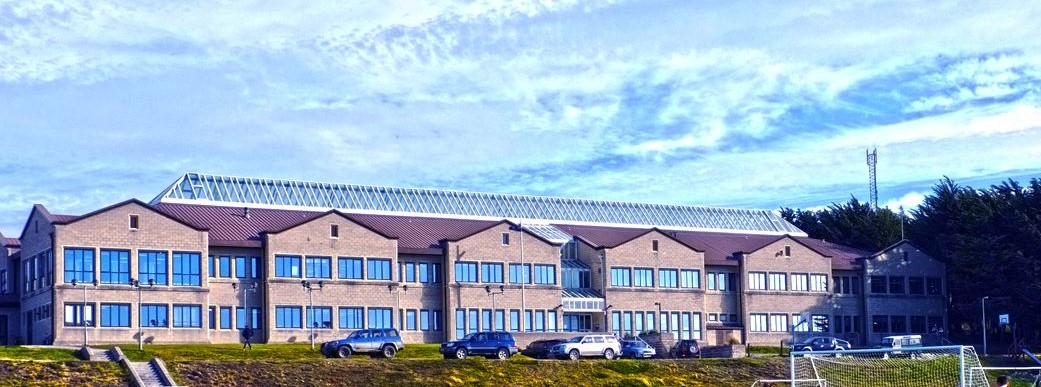
Falkland Islands Community School as seen from the sports field

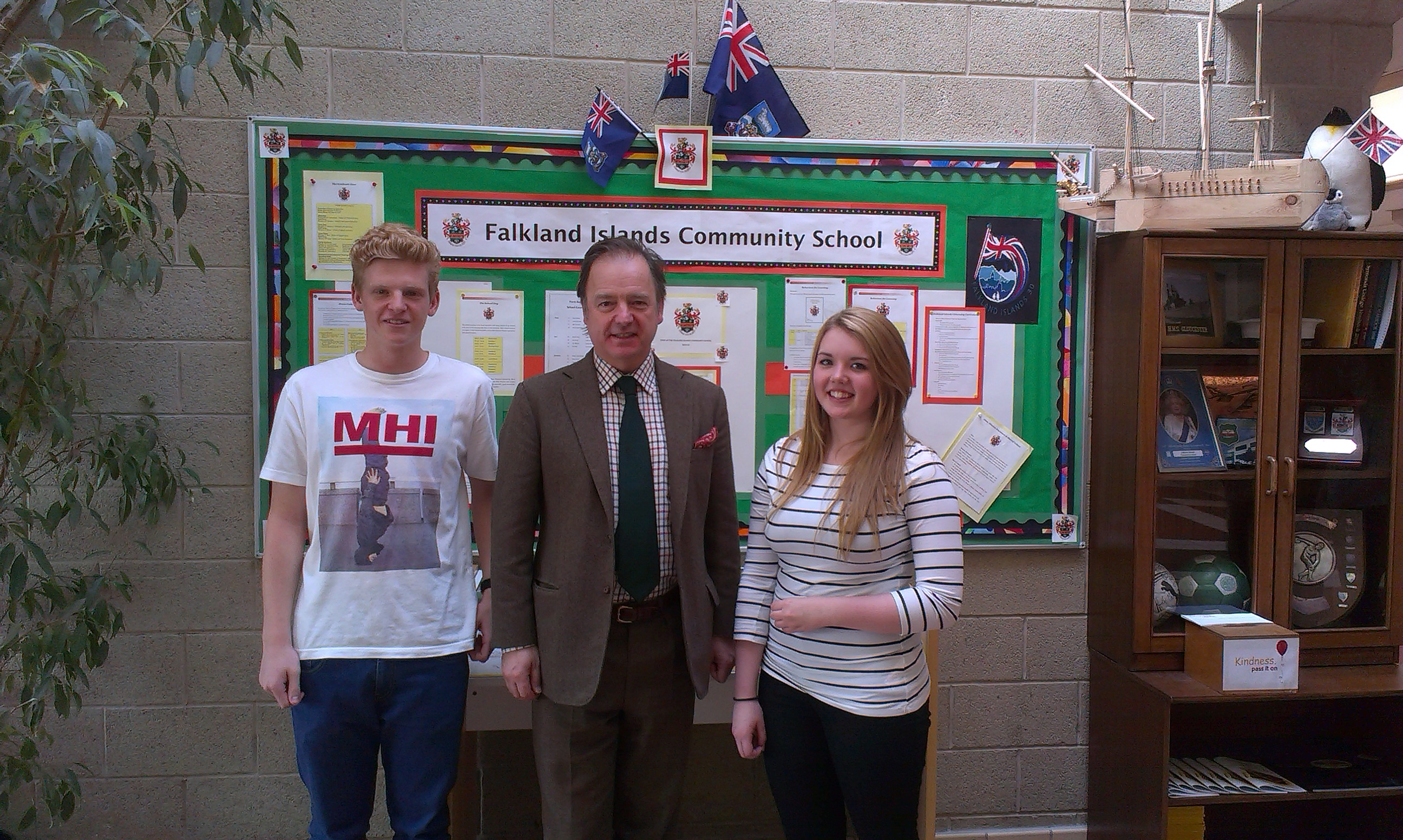
Falkland Islands Community School

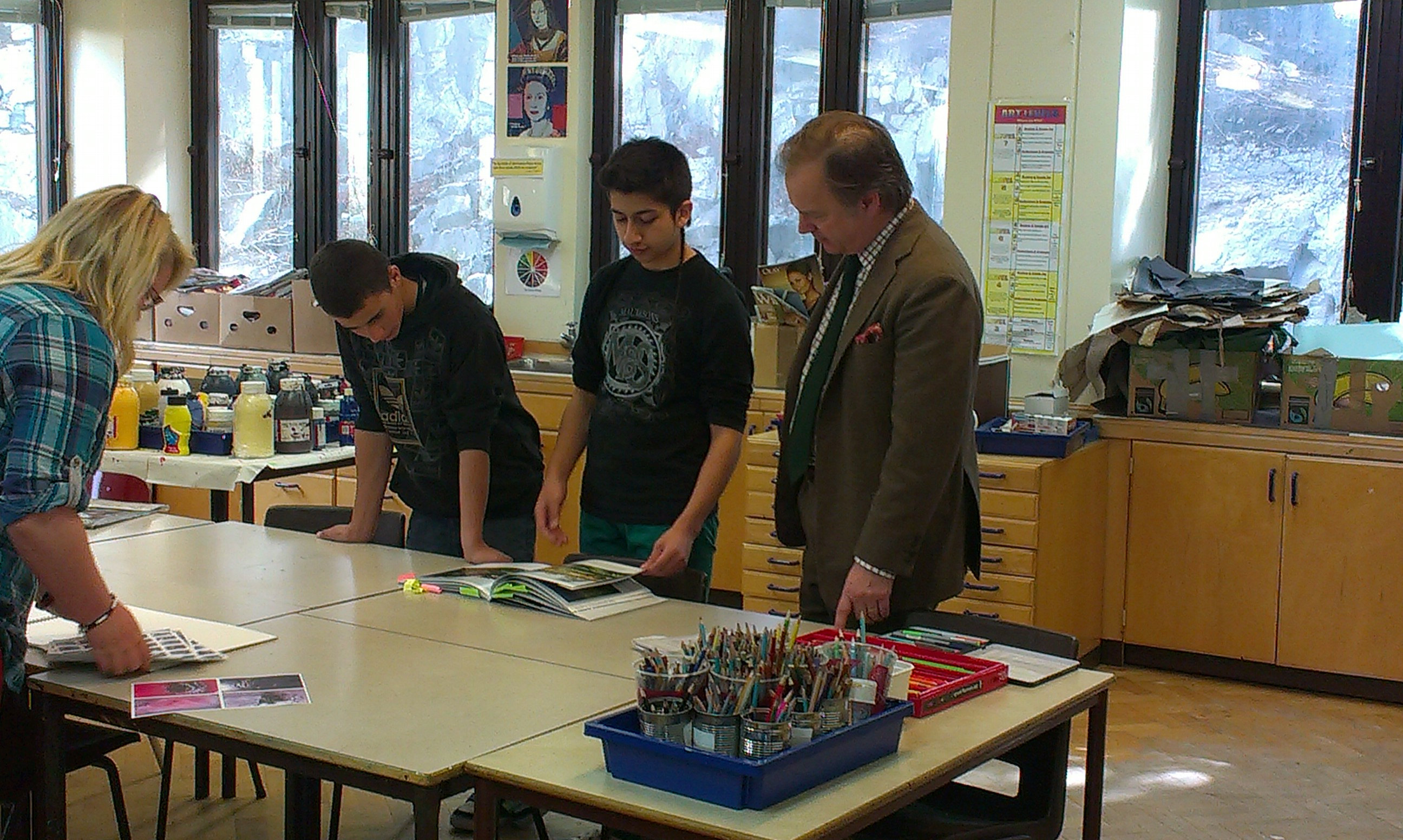
Falkland Islands Community School
