= Priory Pembroke Academy =

Secondary school in Lincoln

The Priory Pembroke Academy

Location
- Croft Lane; Cherry Willingham, Lincolnshire, LN3 4JP; England; 53°14′46″N 0°27′24″W

Information
- Type: Academy
- Established: 2017
- Local authority: Lincolnshire
- Department for Education URN: 145052 Tables
- Ofsted: Reports
- Chair of Governors: Tracey Wood
- Headteacher: Helen Spoors
- Age: 11 to 16
- Enrolment: 449

The Priory Pembroke Academy (formerly Cherry Willingham Community School, Cherry Willingham Comprehensive School and Cherry Willingham Secondary Modern School) is a school for pupils aged 11–16 on Croft Lane in the village Cherry Willingham, located just outside the city of Lincoln, England.

It opened under its current name in September 2017, under The Priory Federation of Academies. It was named for William Marshal, 1st Earl of Pembroke.

== History ==
=== Secondary modern school ===
Cherry Willingham Secondary Modern School was built during 1964–65, and opened in 1965 to serve the villages of Cherry Willingham, Reepham, Fiskerton, Greetwell, Langworth, Nettleham, Apley, Bullington, Barlings, Fulnetby, Goltho, Holton cum Beckering, Newball, Rand, Scothern, Stainfield, Stainton by Langworth, Sudbrooke, and Wragby. It would be for 270.

Right from the start, Nettleham people did not want to go to the school, and neither did Wragby, who questioned if GCE courses would be possible. After many complaints in January 1962, Wragby was removed from the plan. It would cost £132,904. The plan was approved at the end of April 1962.

The school replaced the old secondary school that was sited at Fiskerton and many of the teachers who taught at Fiskerton transferred to Cherry Willingham. The first headteacher was Jock Borthwick, appointed in In October 1964. He had been a maths teacher at High Holme Secondary Modern in Louth since 1956. It was officially opened on Monday 25 October 1965 by John Scupham, who attended the De Aston School.

Pupils who passed the eleven-plus examination and went on to a grammar school, went either to Lincoln or to De Aston School in Market Rasen. This situation continued until 1974, when the education system was reformed through the Local Government Act 1972, after which administration of the school was transferred from Lindsey Education Committee to Lincolnshire County Council.

In 1970, Lindsey County Council decided to enlarge the school, so that people from Scothern would go there, and not to the William Farr School. In 1970 O-level courses were introduced in two subjects, and the school would go comprehensive by 1974.

=== Comprehensive ===
After the 1970s reform of the education system, Cherry Willingham changed from a secondary modern to a comprehensive school, and built what became known as the New Block to house the rising number of pupils. Mobile classrooms were also housed on the playground.

In 1984 Jock Borthwick retired, Peter Fletcher replacing him as headmaster. Fletcher fought to save the school from closure as either Cherry Willingham or Sturton by Stow school was to close; Cherry Willingham survived. Fletcher left to become a Schools Inspector. John Whittle became headmaster in summer 1987, and David Mills in 1993.

During the late 1980s the mobile classrooms were removed. At this time the school had a small farm situated on the site of a previous outdoor swimming pool. The farm included rare breed chickens, ducks, rabbits and sheep, which the school exhibited at the Lincolnshire Show.

In 1991 the Technology Block was updated to accommodate curriculum changes and subjects taught. The typing room, joint needlework and domestic science rooms, and metalwork and woodwork rooms were modernised to provide practical and theory lessons in technology, textiles, food technology, design realisation and graphics. The block was opened on 6 December 1991 by Edward Leigh MP. In 1974 the Partial Hearing Unit was opened in two classrooms in the original main block. The unit's main room maximised sound quality by including baffled walls, double doors, double-glazing, curtains and carpeted floors.

A garage area, previously used to build canoes, and later used as a potting shed and store, was converted to the Dorothy Bowman Art Studio, named after Dorothy Bowman, Chair of the Governors since the school opened.

=== New buildings ===
In January 1998 a new block to house music, music practice rooms, drama, two classrooms and offices was opened. The block was built parallel to the main block and in line with the older New Block. The school decided to honour the first headteacher, naming it the Borthwick Block.

Work followed to update the older concrete New Block shortly afterwards. Windows were replaced, a pitched roof added and walls insulated, and a facing applied to give the appearance of red brick. The building was renamed Fletcher Block and was officially re-opened by former headteacher, Peter Fletcher, who at that time was the Director of Education in Hull.

A new sports complex, complete with dance studio, weights room and gymnasium, changing rooms and a large main sports hall, was officially opened on 10 October 2001 by Princess Alexandra.

In 2003 it became a Specialist Sports College, and was in 2007 rated as a High Performing Specialist School.

=== Fire ===
The school suffered a major fire to the school's Main Block on 23 April 2010. There was significant damage to the first, second and ground floors, due to heat and smoke (with water damage caused by the attempts of fire fighters to extinguish the fire). The fire was apparently caused by an electrical fault, although the exact cause was never publicly identified. The building was repaired, officially reopened, and now includes computer suites.

=== Transferal to academy status ===
In 2015 the school was classified as 'Inadequate' and put into 'Special Measures' by Ofsted following a visit by inspectors in June 2015. This further downgrading of status came within a year of Ofsted Inspectors reporting that the school 'Requires Improvement'. Approximately 288 pupils attended the school in December 2015, by 2017 this had fallen to around 160.

In 2017, it was announced that the school would join The Priory Federation of Academies and come under new leadership as The Priory Pembroke Academy.

== Buildings ==
- The Main Block
- The Fletcher Block (formerly the New Block), opened in 1972, reopened in 2001.
- The Whittle Science Block
- The Borthwick Block, opened in 1998
- The Dorothy Bowman Art Studio
- The Sports Hall, opened in 2001 by Princess Alexandra
- The Darwin Block, opened in 2004
- The Technology Corridor (adjoining the main block)
- The Keith Alexander building, opened by Keith Alexander
