= Welbourn =

Village and civil parish in the North Kesteven district of Lincolnshire, England

Coordinates: 53.073879°N 0.555081°W

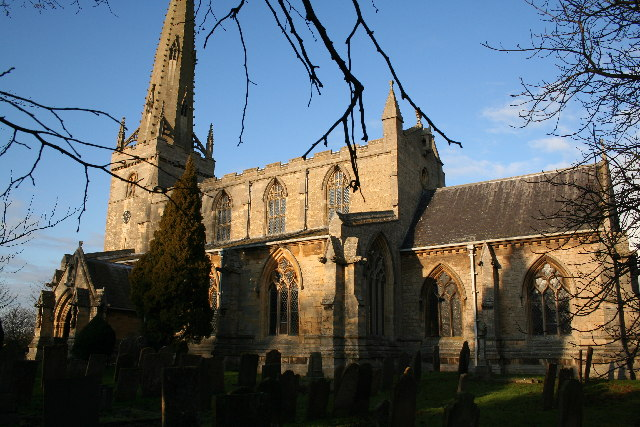
- St Chad's Church, Welbourn

- Location within Lincolnshire
- Population: 647 (2011)
- OS grid reference: SK969539
  - London: 110 mi (180 km) S
- District: North Kesteven
- Shire county: Lincolnshire
- Region: East Midlands
- Country: England
- Sovereign state: United Kingdom
- Post town: LINCOLN
- Postcode district: LN5
- Police: Lincolnshire
- Fire: Lincolnshire
- Ambulance: East Midlands
- UK Parliament: Sleaford and North Hykeham

Welbourn is a village and civil parish in the North Kesteven district of Lincolnshire, England. The population of the civil parish at the 2011 census was 647. The village is situated on the A607 road, 11 miles (18 km) south from Lincoln and 8 miles (13 km) north-west from Sleaford, and between the villages of Leadenham and Wellingore. To the east lies the course of Ermine Street, now the Viking Way.

The name 'Welbourn' derives from the Old English wella-burna meaning 'stream with a spring'.

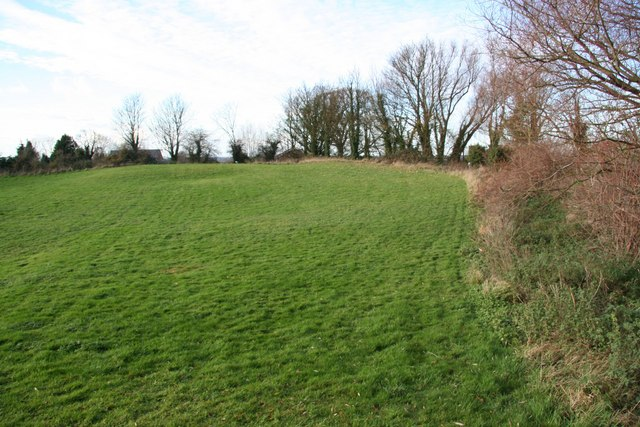
Castle Hill

The village church is St Chad's, part of the Loveden Deanery of the Diocese of Lincoln. The village public house is the Joiners Arms.

At Castle Hill to the north of the village are the earthwork remains of Welbourn Castle, a medieval ringwork. The site was purchased in 1998 by Welbourn Parish Council, with the help of a grant from the Heritage Memorial Fund, and is now maintained as a scheduled monument and community open space.

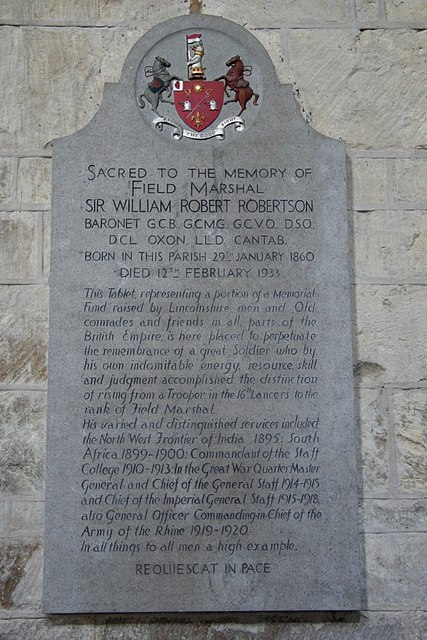
Memorial to Field Marshal Sir William Robertson (1860–1933) in the parish church

In 1598 Francis Trigge, Rector of Welbourn, arranged for a library to be set up in the room over the south porch of St Wulfram's Church, Grantham for the use of the clergy and the inhabitants of the town; the Francis Trigge Chained Library is claimed as the first public library. The anti-slavery campaigner and academic Peter Peckard was born in the village, the son of the Rev. John Peckard. Field Marshal Sir William Robertson, who served in the First World War, was born in Welbourn. The village secondary school, Sir William Robertson Academy, is named after Robertson.

On 23 October 1666 a tornado rated an estimated T8 or T9 on the TORRO scale struck the village before moving north towards Wellingore, Navenby, and Boothby Graffoe.

Thomas Short described it:

"it came with such Violence and Force, that at Welbourn it levelled most of the Houses to the Ground; broke down some, and tore up other Trees by the Roots, scattering abroad much Corn and Hay. One Boy only was killed. It went on to Willingmore [Wellingore], where it overthrew some Houses, and killed two Children in them. Thence it passed on and touched the Skirts of Nanby [Navenby], and ruined a few Houses. Keeping its Course to the next Town [Boothby Graffoe], where it dashed the Church Steeple in pieces, furiously rent the Church itself, both Stone and Timber Work, left little of either standing, only the Body of the Steeple."

== Saperton ==
The village is associated with the site of the lost settlement of Saperton. The exact location of the site is unknown.
