= Huntingtower Academy =

Non-denominational, mixed primary academy in Grantham, South Kesteven, Lincolnshire

Coordinates: 52.9064°N 0.6462°W

Huntingtower Community Primary Academy

Location
- Huntingtower Road; Grantham, Lincolnshire; England

Information
- Type: Academy
- Local authority: Lincolnshire
- Trust: Priory Federation of Academies
- Department for Education URN: 139618 Tables
- Ofsted: Reports
- Headteacher: Emma Harkins
- Gender: Co-educational
- Age: 4 to 11
- Website: www.huntingtowerprimary.co.uk

Huntingtower Community Primary Academy (formerly Huntingtower Road Primary School) is a non-denominational, mixed primary academy in Grantham, South Kesteven, Lincolnshire. Opened in 1914, the school, located on Huntingtower Road, educates 388 pupils, aged 4 to 11. It gained academy status in 2013. The school curriculum was rated good in the 2016 Ofsted inspection.

Former Prime Minister Margaret Thatcher was a pupil at the school between 1930 and 1936, before winning a scholarship to attend the local grammar school, Kesteven and Grantham Girls' School.
