= Gleed (surname) =

Gleed is a surname. Notable people with the surname include:

- Danuta Gleed (1946–1996), Canadian writer
- Edward C. Gleed (1916–1990), American fighter pilot
- Ian Gleed (1916–1943), British flying ace
- Jason Gleed, Canadian musician, songwriter, and producer
- Jon Gleed (born 1984), Canadian ice hockey player
- Philip K. Gleed (1834–1897), American attorney and politician
- Robert Gleed (1836–1916), American politician
