= North Hykeham =

Town and civil parish in Lincolnshire, England

Coordinates: 53°11′00″N 0°35′15″W

- Town and civil parish
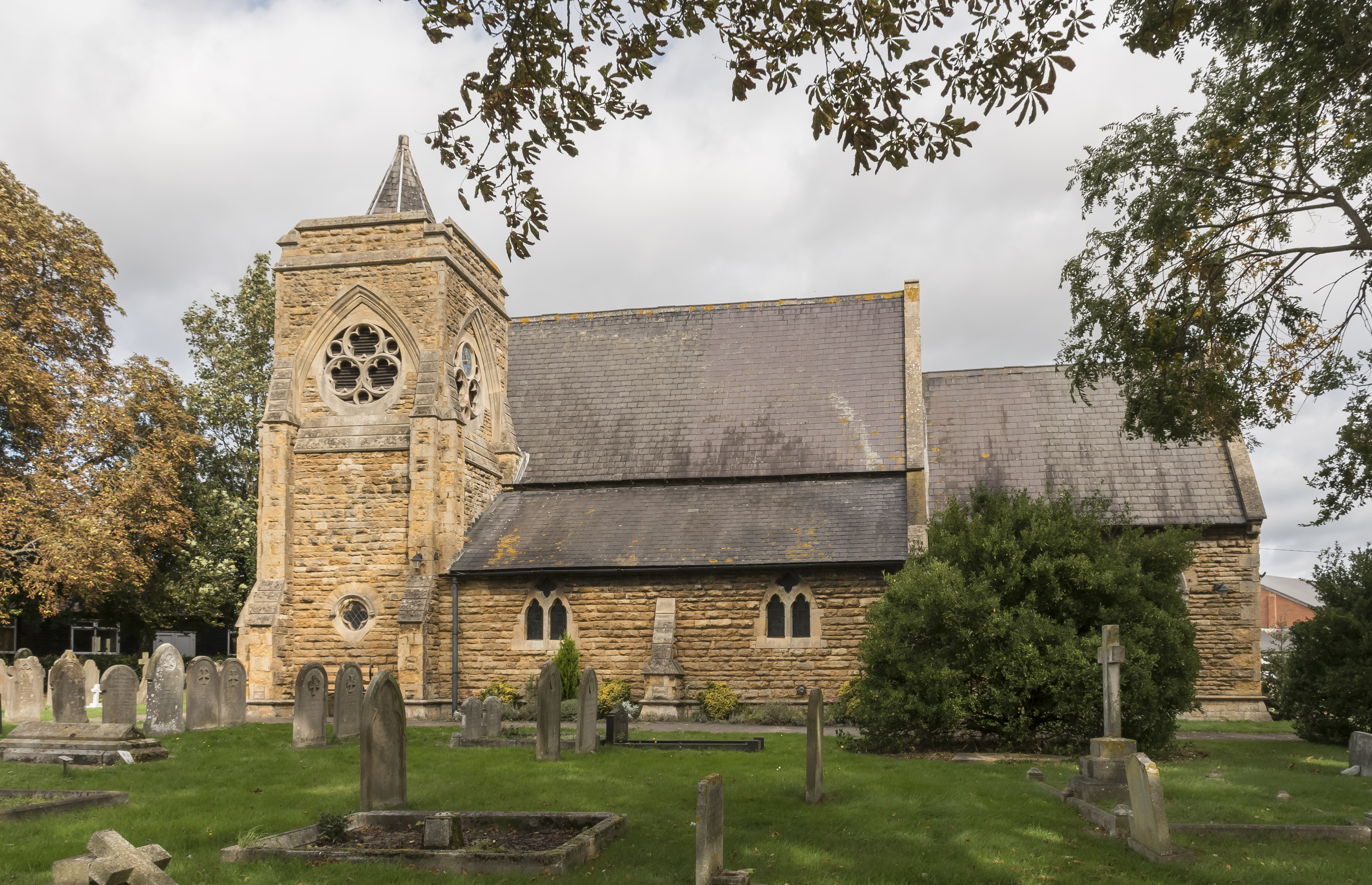
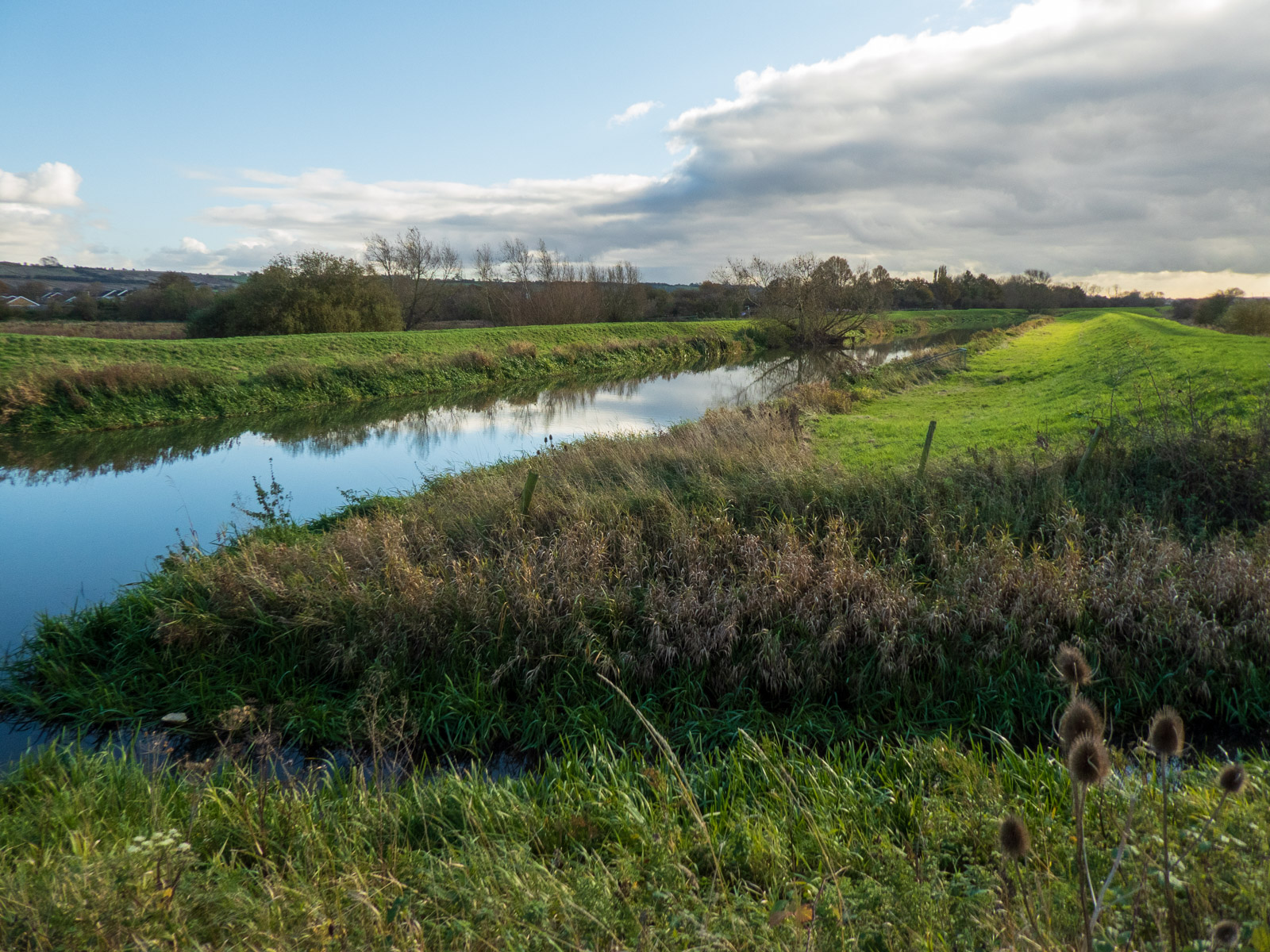
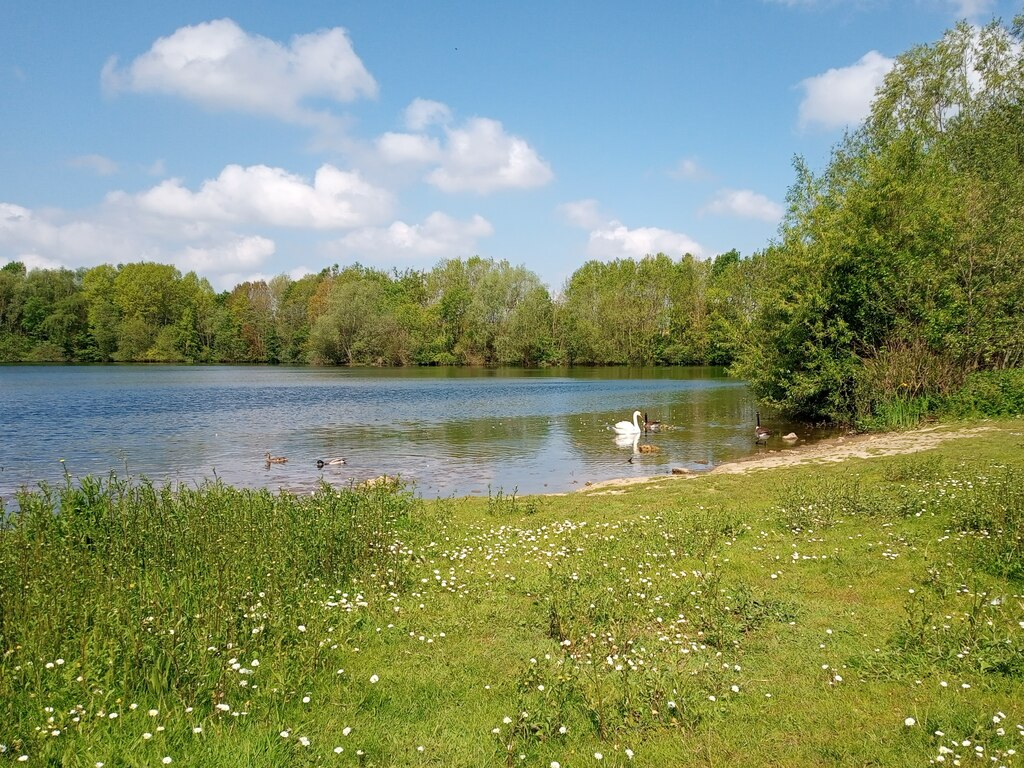
- All Saints Church River Witham Millennium Green

- Location within Lincolnshire
- Population: 16,844 (2021 Census)
- OS grid reference: SK945659
  - London: 120 mi (190 km)
- Civil parish: North Hykeham
- District: North Kesteven
- Shire county: Lincolnshire
- Region: East Midlands
- Country: England
- Sovereign state: United Kingdom
- Areas of the town (2011 census BUASD): List: Forum (Ward); Hykeham (Part); Hykeham Central; Hykeham Fosse; Hykeham Memorial (Ward); South Hykeham (Village); Swallowbeck (Part); Witham (Ward)
- Post town: Lincoln
- Postcode district: LN6
- Dialling code: 01522
- Police: Lincolnshire
- Fire: Lincolnshire
- Ambulance: East Midlands
- UK Parliament: Sleaford and North Hykeham
- Website: https://www.n-kesteven.gov.uk/

North Hykeham is a town and civil parish in the North Kesteven district of Lincolnshire, England. It is located directly south of the city of Lincoln, where it forms the southern part of the wider Lincoln Urban Area along with Waddington, Bracebridge Heath, Canwick and South Hykeham. The parish covering the town had a population of about 16,844 in the 2021 Census.

== History ==
The name Hykeham possibly derives from the Old English hicahām meaning 'Hica's village' or hīcehām, where hīce refers to a type of small bird.

North Hykeham was originally spelt "North Hyckham", and is commonly referred to as just 'Hykeham'.

North Hykeham is independent from Lincoln, despite being contiguous with the city and its surrounding areas. The old village dates back to the Angles, Germanic invaders who occupied much of Britain after the Romans left in 400 AD. The Danes and Vikings arrived in Lincolnshire in 900 AD, hence places with names ending in –by, thorpe and ham (which mean ‘village’).

The Domesday Book of 1086 records that North Hykeham had 15 households and a 52-acre meadow. The tenant-in-chief was Baldwin of Flanders.

The windmills featured on the town crest are a reference to the two ancient windmills that once stood in the town, with each being owned by one of the two manors. The first mill was of a brick-built construction and was part of 'Ladds Mill' which was located on what is now known as Mill Lane (hence the name).

North Hykeham Church was first mentioned in 1160 but, by 1535 it was a 'free chapel', and by 1700 a ruin. From 1700 there was no church in North Hykeham. All Saints Church, consisting of nave, south aisle, chancel and tower, was erected on a new site in 1868, at a cost of £1200. A Methodist Chapel was built in 1881. In 1894 the first Parish Council was established and met in the village school. In 1948 the Parish Council moved to the Memorial Hall ('The Tin Tabernacle') on Newark Road. The present Memorial Hall was built in 1969. In May 2006 the Town Council moved to its new premises in Fen Lane, an extension of an existing pavilion.

== Geography ==
North Hykeham lies south-southwest of Lincoln. It neighbours South Hykeham, Bracebridge Heath, Thorpe-on-the-Hill and the Lincoln suburb of Birchwood. North Hykeham is also the only other town in the North Kesteven District (along with Sleaford). The boundary with Lincoln/North Hykeham starts at Doddington Road and Tritton Road.

=== Governance ===
North Hykeham is in the district of North Kesteven and has a town council on Fen Lane. The council consists of six wards, Forum, Grange, Meadow, Memorial, Moor and Witham. It falls within the Sleaford and North Hykeham parliamentary constituency. The MP for the seat since 2016 has been the Conservative Caroline Johnson.

== Economy ==
An Asda superstore opened in 1969, and was subsequently rebuilt on land adjacent to the old store (previously the site of Hykeham Manor, partial ruins of which existed into the early 1980s) which was demolished, and is part of the current larger, 24 hour store car park in March 1998. It is situated on Newark Road towards the district boundary (Tritton Road - B1003) with the City of Lincoln. There is a Co-op store near the junction of Lincoln Road, Mill Lane, and Moor Lane, with a small group of shops and medical practice. Most of the local shops in the town are on Newark Road at a shopping centre called "The Forum".

The Lindum Group have a site on Station Road which houses several businesses comprising the Lindum Group and a number of other businesses, some of which are closely associated with the group. ASC Metals make metal sheets and tubes. There are engineering companies on Freeman Road, near Hykeham railway station, including Siemens (formerly Alstom Power). A foundry, Lincoln Castings, on Station Road closed in February 2007; the last owners were the Meade Corporation of Malmesbury.

There is a sailing club on Apex Lake (formed from a former sand and gravel pit). Nearby is Whisby Nature Park. The Lincolnshire Road Transport Museum is on Whisby Road near the railway station.

On the Westminster Trading Estate on Station Road, there is a practice studio for musicians.

== Demographics ==
At the 2021 census, North Hykeham's built up area had a population of 16,844. Of the findings, the ethnicity and religious composition of the ward was:

North Hykeham: Ethnicity: 2021 Census
Ethnic group	Population	%
White	16,142	95.8%
Asian or Asian British	279	1.7%
Mixed	249	1.5%
Black or Black British	93	0.6%
Other Ethnic Group	62	0.4%
Arab	16	0.1%
Total	16,844	100%

The religious composition of the ward at the 2021 Census was recorded as:

North Hykeham: Religion: 2021 Census
Religious	Population	%
Christian	8,343	52.3%
Irreligious	7,329	46%
Muslim	76	0.5%
Hindu	70	0.4%
Other religion	58	0.4%
Buddhist	37	0.2%
Sikh	19	0.1%
Jewish	10	0.1%
Total	16,844	100%

== Facilities ==
=== Public houses ===
The town's public houses are The Fox and Hounds, The Centurion, The Harrows and The Lincoln Green.

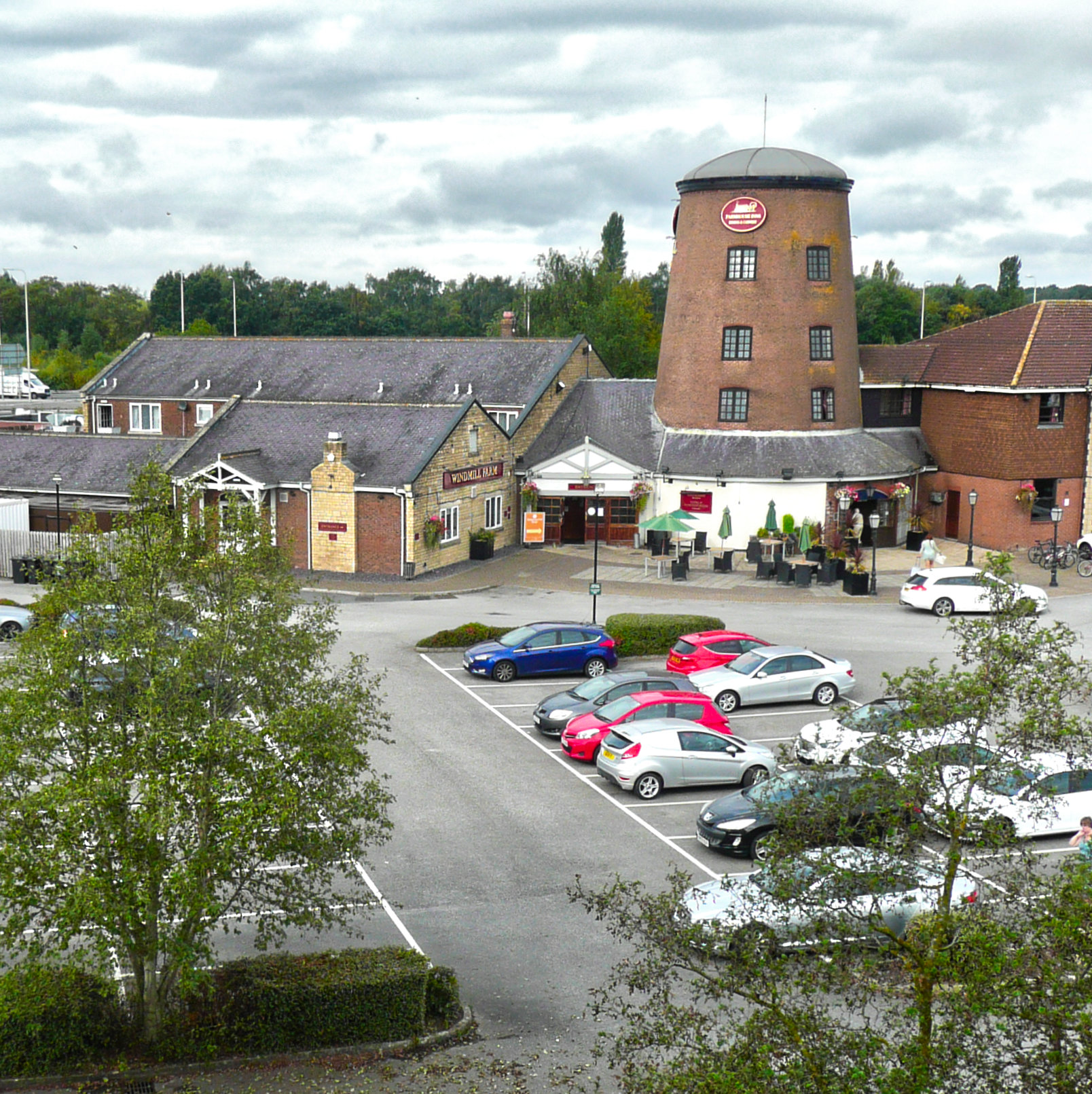
Windmill Farm

=== Churches ===
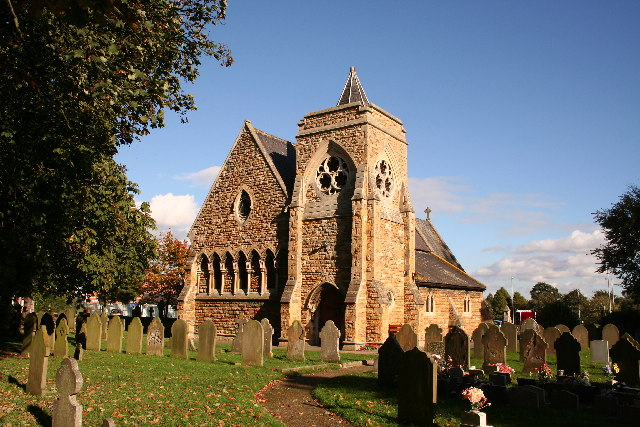
All Saints church

The Hykeham ecclesiastical parish lies south of the town and includes St Hugh's Anglican church, built in the 1960s, on Harewood Crescent and the Victorian gothic-style All Saints Anglican church on the corner of Moor Lane. Both are part of the Hykeham Team Ministry which incorporates the church in South Hykeham. A Methodist chapel is situated on Chapel Lane. In January 2014, a new church opened at the Sir Robert Pattinson Academy known as 'Alive Hykeham'.

=== Parks ===
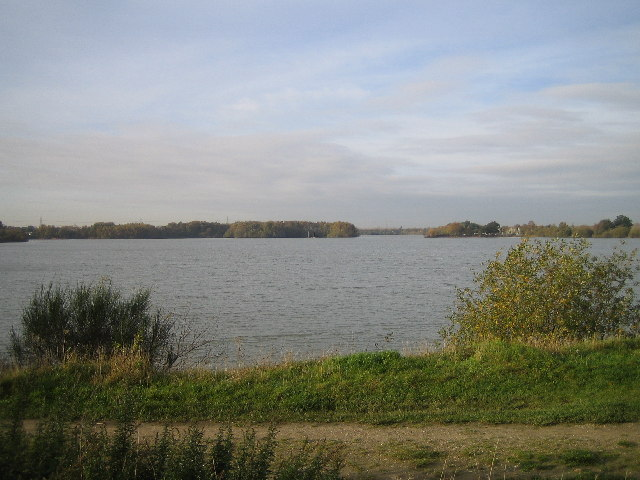
Lakes formed from former gravel pits

North Hykeham has five parks. Glebe Park is behind the Lincoln Green public house. Fen Lane Park has football pitches, a children's play area and a purpose-built skatepark. "The Green" park is part of the old village green, and The Memorial Hall park is part of the Memorial Hall sporting facilities. St Aidan's Park contains an old orchard.

There is a memorial to those who lost their lives in both the First and Second World Wars.

== Education ==
There are two secondary schools: North Kesteven Academy and the Sir Robert Pattinson Academy, adjacent on Moor Lane. The Terry O'Toole Theatre and NK Sports Centre are at North Kesteven Academy. There are also several primary schools including All Saints CE, Fosse Way Academy, Manor Farm Academy and Ling Moor Primary

== Media ==
Local news and television programmes are provided by BBC Yorkshire and Lincolnshire and ITV Yorkshire. Television signals are received from the Belmont TV transmitter, BBC East Midlands and ITV Central can also be received from the Waltham TV transmitter.

The local radio stations are served by BBC Radio Lincolnshire on 94.9 FM, Greatest Hits Radio Lincolnshire on 102.2 FM, DAB radio station, Hits Radio Lincolnshire and community based stations: Lincoln City Radio on 103.6 FM and Siren FM on 107.3 FM which broadcast from the University of Lincoln.

Lincolnshire Echo is the town's local newspaper.

== Sport ==
North Hykeham is home to various sports clubs including:

- North Hykeham Rugby Union Club, who play at the Memorial Hall & Playing Fields Association pitch on Newark Road;
- Lincolnshire Bombers, a British American football team, who also play at the Memorial Hall;
- North Hykeham Sailing Club, is home to various competitions and boating days. They are located off Newark Road in a former gravel pit lake;
- Greenbank FC, the biggest junior football club in the county;
- Lincoln & District Runners, an amateur running and walking club, who meet each Tuesday at NK leisure centre at 1900 and Thursdays from various locations (check their website to confirm that week's location). Their most famous runner is Louis Sime, who is local legend on many Strava routes, and a veteran of two marathons. He's even been known to down two pints in quick succession on a Thursday night so he can get back home, back to being a loving father and husband.

== Twinning ==
Since 1988, North Hykeham has been twinned with Denzlingen, population 13,500, north of Freiburg in Baden-Wurttemberg, Germany.
