= The Priory Witham Academy =

School for ages 3–18 in Lincoln, England

Location
- De Wint Avenue; Lincoln, Lincolnshire, LN6 7DT; England
- Coordinates: 53.20423°N 0.57093°W

Information
- Type: Academy
- Department for Education URN: 135563 Tables
- Ofsted: Reports
- Chair of Governors: Patrick Smith-Howell
- Headteacher: Amy Tallentire (Primary); Micelle Garner (Secondary)
- Gender: Mixed
- Age: 3 to 18
- Enrolment: 1,057
- Website: http://www.prioryacademies.co.uk/page/?title=Home&pid=27

The Priory Witham Academy is a mixed all-through school and sixth form located in Lincoln in the English county of Lincolnshire. The school educates pupils aged 3 to 18.

== History ==
=== Secondary modern school ===
Building of the new secondary modern school was to be finished by August 1957. It opened in September 1957 as Boultham Moor Secondary Modern Girls School. It was officially opened on Monday April 28, 1958, with the Bishop of Lincoln, Kenneth Riches. There were twelve classrooms, four laboratories, two domestic science rooms, and rooms for needlework, art and general crafts. There were 480 places, to be extended to 600. It was built by Messrs FR Eccleshare Ltd.

The Foreign Secretary, Rab Butler, spoke at the school on Thursday 16 July 1964.

By 1974 it was planned to become the Boultham Moor Secondary School, a coeducational, for ages 12–18, with around 1000 children. In May 1972 it was to be called Ancaster High School from September 1972. There were 650 girls in 1972.

=== Comprehensive ===
It became the co-educational comprehensive Ancaster High School in 1974, with around 1000 on the roll. As Ancaster High School, it received some of the lowest GCSE results in England; other Lincolnshire secondary schools that had similar low GCSE results (resulting in the schools being merged) were the Tennyson High School, Mablethorpe (became part of the Louth Academy, with the Mablethorpe site closing in 2016) and the Skegness Earl of Scarbrough High School, which became St Clements College, then in 2010 became Skegness Academy. These three schools regularly had the lowest GCSE results in the county.

The Secretary of State for Education visited on Friday 18 June 1982, Sir Keith Joseph, before going on to Gainsborough.

=== Academy ===
The school was formed in September 2008 from the merger of Moorlands Infant School, Usher Junior School and Ancaster High School. As an academy the school is part of The Priory Federation of Academies Trust.

== Curriculum ==
The Priory Witham Academy offers GCSEs, BTECs, OCR Nationals and City and Guilds courses as programmes of study for pupils, while students in the sixth form have the option to study from a range of A Levels and further BTEC and City and Guilds courses.
