= The Priory Ruskin Academy =

Secondary school and sixth form with academy status in Lincolnshire, England

Location
- Rushcliffe Road; Grantham, Lincolnshire, NG31 8ED; England

Information
- Type: Academy
- Department for Education URN: 136194 Tables
- Ofsted: Reports
- Chair of governors: Steve Milner
- Headteacher: Ben Key
- Gender: Co-educational
- Age: 11 to 19
- Enrolment: 1360
- Website: http://www.prioryruskin.co.uk/page/default.asp?title=Home&pid=1

The Priory Ruskin Academy is a co-educational secondary school and sixth form with academy status, in Grantham in the English county of Lincolnshire.

The school was formed in 2010 from the merger of Central Technology & Sports College and the Grantham Church High School. It originally occupied both of the former school sites but in 2014 moved to new buildings at the former Central Technology & Sports College site. As an academy, the school is part of The Priory Federation of Academies Trust.

The Priory Ruskin Academy offers GCSEs and OCR Nationals as programmes of study for pupils, while students in the sixth form have the option to study a range of A Levels and BTECs.
