= Spalding Academy, Lincolnshire =

Mixed secondary school and sixth form

Spalding Academy

Location
- Neville Avenue; Spalding, Lincolnshire, PE11 2EJ; England; 52°47′10″N 0°08′21″W

Information
- Type: Academy
- Motto: Aspire, Challenge, Achieve
- Established: 1941; 85 years ago (as Gleed Boys' School and Gleed Girls' Technology College); 2011; 15 years ago (as Sir John Gleed School); 2016; 10 years ago (as Spalding Academy)
- Department for Education URN: 144488 Tables
- Ofsted: Reports
- CEO: Jemma Curson
- Headteacher: Glenn Martin
- Gender: Mixed
- Age: 11 to 16
- Enrolment: 1,332 as of January 2016
- Website: http://www.spaldingacademy.org.uk/

Spalding Academy (formerly Sir John Gleed School) is a mixed secondary school and sixth form in Spalding, Lincolnshire, England.

The Sir John Gleed School was formed in November 2011 as a result of a merger of Gleed Boys' School and Gleed Girls' Technology College, each of which had been judged Good by Ofsted. The two schools were only merged because falling rolls were forecast in this part of Lincolnshire. It was named after Sir John Wilson Gleed, M.A., J.P. (1865–1946) who was chairman of the Holland Education Committee and of Holland County Council. He was knighted for political and public service by King George VI on 13 June 1939. The school was re-named to Spalding Academy, at the beginning of September 2016 its sponsorship changed to South Lincolnshire Academies Trust (SLAT).

The school was converted to academy status in January 2013 and was part of the CfBT Schools Trust. The school operated a vocational sixth form. It was placed in "special measures" by Ofsted on 10 June 2013, having been judged as being "inadequate" for achievement of pupils, quality of teaching, behaviour and safety of pupils, leadership and management.

Its sister school in (SLAT) is Bourne Academy, the lead school in the Trust.
