= Priory City of Lincoln Academy =

Secondary school in Lincolnshire, England

The Priory City of Lincoln Academy

Location
- Skellingthorpe Road; Lincoln, Lincolnshire, LN6 0EP; England; 53°12′47″N 0°34′23″W

Information
- Type: Academy
- Motto: Grace and Glory
- Established: 1896; 130 years ago
- Specialists: Sports and health
- Department for Education URN: 135564 Tables
- Ofsted: Reports
- Chair: Colin Parkin
- Headteacher: Martin Whitaker
- Gender: Mixed
- Age: 11 to 18
- Enrolment: 921 as of March 2022
- Capacity: 950
- Houses: Newton; Tennyson; Franklin; St Hugh
- Colours: Red, white and gold
- Website: https://www.priorycity.co.uk

The Priory City of Lincoln Academy (abbreviated as Lincoln Academy and formerly The City of Lincoln Community College) is a co-educational secondary academy and sixth form in Lincoln, Lincolnshire, England. It is a member of The Priory Federation of Academies and leads the government's School Games Organiser programme. It is also a specialist school in sports and health, exercising a partially selective intake in the former.

== History ==
=== Construction ===
The school was built by FR Eccleshare Ltd of Dixon Street, to be finished by the end of June 1968. The contract was for £340,000. It opened on Tuesday 10 September 1968, with 600 boys, and the headteacher was Mr L Middleton. The total cost was £344,000, with a site of 35 acres.

It was officially opened on Friday 27 September 1968, by Sir Francis Hill and the Bishop of Lincoln, Kenneth Riches. The head boy was Steve Adlard.

The next phase of construction was approved in March 1969, to cost £228,000. In November 1969, the second phase of construction was to begin by March 1971, costing £324,000, and was approved by the (Labour) government for 1970/71, for the school to become an eight-form comprehensive school. The chief education officer for Lincoln was Francis Stuart. In June 1970, selection was planned to continue to 1972. The swimming pool was officially opened on Wednesday 23 May 1973.

The main part of the old School Building was completed in 1975 to designs by Associated Architects of Birmingham and was described in the Buildings of England as having an arresting sawtooth rhythm along the roof, repeated in the window heads and canopy.

=== Grammar school ===
It was originally the City School, Lincoln, and moved from its original site on Monks Road, Lincoln in 1968. Much of the old school site was demolished in July 1976. In April 1928, the name of the former school changed from the City of Lincoln Municipal Secondary School for Boys, mostly referred to as Lincoln Technical School, to Lincoln City School.

The school competed in Television Top of the Form, broadcast on BBC1 on Thursday 3 April 1969 against girls from Cambridge Grammar School (now Long Road Sixth Form College). The team was Andrew Dobbs aged 11, Raymond Yarsley, John Herrick, and Anoottam Ghosh. The team won 43-38. In the quarter-final the team faced boys of Whitley Bay Grammar School on Thursday 15 May 1969. The team lost 64-52.

=== Comprehensive ===
In February 1973 boys were transferred from the former Sincil Secondary Modern School. By February 1973 the school had 1200 boys, when it went comprehensive, under the new headteacher Alan Garner. At the July 1973 prizegiving, the headteacher admitted that competition and comprehensive education did not always go together. He said that, due to comprehensive education the teacher must ask, that a boy should do his best, not say what his best should be.

After the high standards, and reputation, of the former boys grammar school, standards started to plummet within months. By April 1974, the headteacher had to lock the toilets during class time, to prevent truancy.

In September 1974 it became a co-educational Comprehensive School and was known as City of Lincoln Community College.

=== Meningitis outbreak ===
In November 1995 there was an outbreak of meningitis. 15 year old Sam Binns died on 20 November 1995, and 15 year old Kelly Roberts died on 30 October 1995. The school had to close. Barbara Peck was the headteacher.

=== Academy ===
It became an academy in September 2008. The school is part of The Priory Federation of Academies Trust.

With federation membership, a multimillion-pound redevelopment of the site was initiated, with work commencing in 2010 and completed in 2012.

== Sports centre ==
The academy has a sports centre which has a swimming pool, fitness suite, gym, Sportshall, Dance Studio and outside there is a field and the MUGA (multi use games area) which is used for many different sports. In mid-2014 a 3G artificial pitch was opened.

== Notable former pupils ==
=== Boys' grammar school (1968–73) ===
- Steve Adlard, sports coach, head boy in 1968, goalkeeper for the England school team
- Steve Sims (footballer)
