= Giles Academy =

Location
- Church Lane; Old Leake, Lincolnshire, PE22 9LD; England; 53.02954°N 0.09832°E

Information
- Type: Academy
- Department for Education URN: 148185 Tables
- Ofsted: Reports
- Headteacher: Jemma Curson
- Gender: Mixed
- Age: 11 to 18
- Enrolment: 987 as of January 2015
- Website: www.gilesacademy.co.uk

The Giles Academy (formerly the Giles School) is a mixed secondary school located in Old Leake in the English county of Lincolnshire.

== History ==
Giles Secondary Modern School opened its doors to students on Wednesday 10 January 1962. It was built by J.T. Barber of Boston. The school was named after Lt-Col Sir Oswald Giles, who was the chairman of Holland County Council for 18 years; he was knighted in the 1955 Birthday Honours; he died on Tuesday 4 August 1970, aged 82.

It was previously a foundation school administered by Lincolnshire County Council. The new school boasts modern facilities and equipment after a £125,000 investment.

On 1 September 2010, the Giles School converted to academy status and was renamed the Giles Academy. However the school continues to coordinate with Lincolnshire County Council for admissions.

The Giles Academy offers GCSEs and BTECs as programmes of study for pupils. The school previously offered sixth form education for students to study from a range of A Levels and further BTECs. In 2005, the school was awarded a specialism in visual arts. As a result, all key stage 4 students are required to undertake at least one art and design related subject for their GCSE studies.

In November 2015, the school finished constructing a new swimming pool and held an opening ceremony with former student and former Olympic swimmer Melanie Marshall.

In 2016, after 24 years of leadership, Executive Headmaster Chris Walls (the 3rd headteacher in over 50 years of the school's history) retired. Previous Deputy Headmaster Ian Widdows was named as his replacement. Since the departure of Widdows several years later, Jemma Curson has served as the school's headteacher, with Chris Wright taking on the role of Head of School.

== Controversies ==
In October 2009, the Giles Academy was fined after an unsupervised art student suffered severe burns to her hands after plunging them into a bucket of plaster of paris. After 12 operations, the student lost all her fingers on one hand, but managed to keep two on the other.

In July 2012, a transgender student was briefly banned from sitting GCSE exams after arriving in a girl's uniform. In response, the student presented the headmaster, Chris Walls, with a copy of the UK's Equality Act. Despite this, the student, Ashlyn Parram, was segregated from everyone else taking the exam.

On 14 February 2020, following numerous poor reports from Ofsted, a termination warning notice was served to the Giles Academy. The report highlighted a number of concerns raised by Ofsted, accusing school leaders of "lack[ing] capacity to improve the school" and describing a culture of "low expectation and low aspiration".

In response to the Ofsted reports and termination warning notice, local news websites began to claim the school was "failing" amidst rumours that the sixth form would be shutting down. The school had only received 30 applications for students wanting to attend sixth form the following academic year.

== Notable alumni ==
- Melanie Marshall (born 1982) Former Olympic athlete, European Gold medal winning swimmer, now coach to Olympic Gold medal winner Adam Peaty
- Brian Bolland (born 1951), cartoonist
- Lewis Brooks (born 1987), former professional football player for Boston United, Boston Town and England U-18
- Confidential (born 2006) Music artist/singer-songwriter
