= Holdingham =

Hamlet in Lincolnshire, England

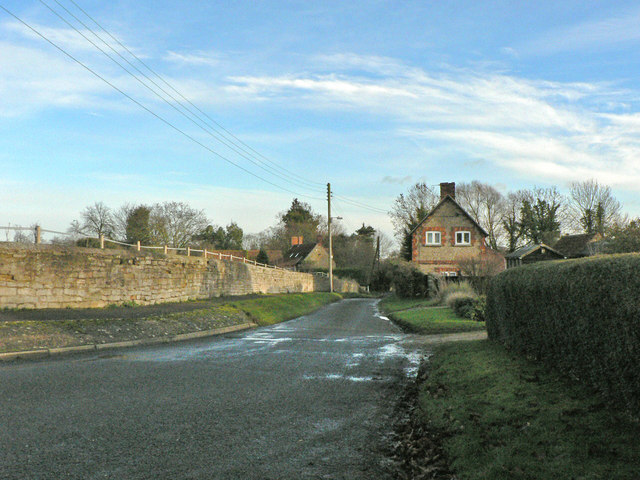
- Cottages in the hamlet

- Location within Lincolnshire
- Civil parish: Sleaford
- District: North Kesteven
- Shire county: Lincolnshire
- Region: East Midlands
- Country: England
- Sovereign state: United Kingdom

Holdingham is a hamlet in the civil parish and built-up area of Sleaford, in the North Kesteven district of Lincolnshire, England. It is bisected by Lincoln Road (B1518) which joins the A17 and A15 roads immediately north of the settlement; those roads connect it to Lincoln, Newark, Peterborough and King's Lynn.

Prehistoric and Romano-British artefacts have been uncovered around Holdingham. There was an early and middle Saxon settlement, which appears to have disappeared in the 9th century. The current settlement's Old English name suggests a pre-conquest origin, though it was not mentioned in the Domesday Book and appears to have formed part of the Bishop of Lincoln's manor of New Sleaford. Holdingham probably functioned as the agricultural focus of the manor, while New Sleaford (0.9 miles or 1.5 km south) was encouraged to expand as a commercial centre. The land was ceded to the Crown in 1540 and was acquired by Robert Carre in 1559; it passed through his family and then, through marriage, to the Earls (later Marquesses) of Bristol, who owned almost all of the land. Enclosed in 1794, it remained a small, primarily agricultural settlement well into the 20th century.

The late 20th century brought substantial change. Holdingham Roundabout was built immediately north of the hamlet in 1975 as part of the A17 bypass around Sleaford; the roundabout also accommodated the A15 bypass which opened in 1993. After Lord Bristol sold the agricultural land around the hamlet, major residential development began; private suburban housing estates were completed either side of Lincoln Road between Sleaford and Holdingham in the 1990s and early 2000s. The hamlet thereby merged into Sleaford's urban area. Further developments took place in the 2010s and more housing has been approved for building in the 2020s on land between Holdingham and The Drove to the south-west.

Holdingham had its own chapel in the Middle Ages, but this was abandoned c. 1550; its site has not been identified securely. It has had a public house since at least the early 19th century, serving drovers bringing their cattle from Scotland to London. The hamlet now has petrol filling stations on the roundabout and Lincoln Road, as well as fast food restaurants, a hotel, a café and a nursing home, all opened since the middle of the 20th century. The nearest schools and other public services are in Sleaford. The hamlet was anciently part of the parish of New Sleaford; in 1866, the civil parish of Holdingham was established but in 1974 was merged into Sleaford civil parish. The hamlet now lends its name to a ward in North Kesteven, although the boundaries differ from those of the old parish. The ward had a population of 3,709 in 2021, up from 2,774 in 2011.

== Geography ==
Holdingham in 1947. The civil parish boundaries are shown in dotted red. The built-up areas are shaded beige (darker for those in the parish, lighter for other areas). The grey lines are roads; the black lines are railway lines (the one passing through Holdingham parish is the now-dismantled Sleaford to Cranwell branch). Key: (1) the purported former location of St Mary's Chapel; (2) The Jolly Scotchman public house; (3) Anna House; (4) Holdingham Anna; (5) Brinkley Hill Farm; (6) Field Farm; (7) Field Lodge; (8) The Rookery (Bouncing Hill); (9) Holdingham Plantation; (10) Summer Plantation.

Holdingham in 2024. Grey shaded areas are business parks or industrial estates. Key: (1) Holdingham Grange; (2) Holdingham Roundabout; (3) service station; (4) North Parade estate; (5) Jubilee Grove estate; (6) St Denys' Avenue housing development; (7) Woodside Avenue estate; (8) housing built since the late 1970s.

=== Topography ===
Holdingham is a settlement 0.9 miles (1.5 km) north of Sleaford, a market town in the North Kesteven district of Lincolnshire. The old hamlet clusters around and is bisected by Lincoln Road (B1518) immediately south of Holdingham Roundabout, which connects Lincoln Road to the A17 and A15 roads. A stream called Field Beck (also known as Holdingham Beck) runs east−west through the hamlet within a narrow, shallow valley. To the south of the hamlet is modern housing, which creates a contiguous urban area with Sleaford.

Holdingham lies between approximately 20 and 30 meters above sea level. The old hamlet on the west side of Lincoln Road is underlain by Jurassic mudstone belonging to the Blisworth Clay Formation, a group of sedimentary rocks formed 165–168 million years ago; this forms a narrow outcrop along Field Beck's shallow valley. The bedrock under the rest of the area (including the modern housing developments) is Cornbrash limestone belonging to the Great Oolite Group of Jurassic rocks formed 161–168 million years ago. The soil belongs to the Aswarby series of brown, calcareous earth; it is free-draining, loamy and lime-rich, suited for growing cereals and grasses. The land is classified as a nitrate vulnerable zone.

=== Parish and ward boundaries ===
Holdingham gave its name to a civil parish which existed between 1866, when it was separated from the ancient parish of New Sleaford, and 1 April 1974, when it was merged into the current successor civil parish of Sleaford. The parish boundaries, which contained the hamlet and adjacent fields and farm houses, were finally amended in 1882.

Since 1998, Holdingham has also given its name to an electoral ward (Sleaford Holdingham) in the district of North Kesteven. The ward's boundaries have been altered several times. As fixed in 2006, they differed from those of the old civil parish by including the Jubilee Grove and Woodside Avenue housing estates, Sleaford Wood, Poplar Business Park and Sleaford Enterprise Park (all east of Lincoln Road); the ward boundaries also excluded most of the land south of the line between The Drove and Sumner's Plantation which had been in the former parish. (Note: "Map Referred to in the District of North Kesteven (Electoral Changes Order) 2006 Sheet 2 of 2" (PDF). Local Government Boundary Commission for England. Compare with Ordnance Survey. 6-Inch Map of England and Wales. Lincolnshire Sheets CVI.NW and CVI.NE. Revised 1947 and published 1950. Retrieved via the National Library of Scotland on 25 May 2024.) In 2021, the Stokes Drive and St Denys' Avenue housing estates (to the west of Lincoln Road) were transferred to the Sleaford Westholme ward.

=== Climate ===
The British Isles experience a temperate, maritime climate with warm summers and cool winters. Data from the weather station nearest to Holdingham (at Cranwell, 3 miles north-west), shows that the average daily mean temperature is 10.1 °C (50.2 °F); this fluctuates from a peak of 17.2 °C (63.0 °F) in July to 4.1 °C (39.4 °F) in January. The average high temperature is 14.1 °C (57.4 °F), though the monthly average varies from 7.0 °C (44.6 °F) in January to 22.1 °C (71.8 °F) in July; the average low is 6.2 °C (43.2 °F) which reaches its lowest in January and February at 1.3 °C (34.3 °F) and its highest in July and August at 12.2 °C (54.0 °F).

Climate data for Cranwell WMO ID: 03379; coordinates 53°01′52″N 0°30′13″W; elevation: 62 m (203 ft); 1991–2020 normals, extremes 1930–present
Month	Jan	Feb	Mar	Apr	May	Jun	Jul	Aug	Sep	Oct	Nov	Dec	Year
Record high °C (°F)	15.0 (59.0)	18.3 (64.9)	23.2 (73.8)	26.3 (79.3)	30.6 (87.1)	32.9 (91.2)	39.9 (103.8)	35.2 (95.4)	31.6 (88.9)	28.6 (83.5)	18.9 (66.0)	15.7 (60.3)	39.9 (103.8)
Mean daily maximum °C (°F)	7.0 (44.6)	7.8 (46.0)	10.4 (50.7)	13.4 (56.1)	16.5 (61.7)	19.4 (66.9)	22.1 (71.8)	21.8 (71.2)	18.6 (65.5)	14.3 (57.7)	9.9 (49.8)	7.2 (45.0)	14.1 (57.4)
Daily mean °C (°F)	4.1 (39.4)	4.6 (40.3)	6.5 (43.7)	8.9 (48.0)	11.8 (53.2)	14.8 (58.6)	17.2 (63.0)	17.0 (62.6)	14.3 (57.7)	10.8 (51.4)	6.9 (44.4)	4.4 (39.9)	10.1 (50.2)
Mean daily minimum °C (°F)	1.3 (34.3)	1.3 (34.3)	2.6 (36.7)	4.5 (40.1)	7.2 (45.0)	10.2 (50.4)	12.2 (54.0)	12.2 (54.0)	10.1 (50.2)	7.2 (45.0)	3.9 (39.0)	1.6 (34.9)	6.2 (43.2)
Record low °C (°F)	−15.7 (3.7)	−13.9 (7.0)	−11.1 (12.0)	−4.8 (23.4)	−2.2 (28.0)	0.0 (32.0)	4.5 (40.1)	3.3 (37.9)	−0.6 (30.9)	−4.4 (24.1)	−8.0 (17.6)	−11.2 (11.8)	−15.7 (3.7)
Average precipitation mm (inches)	48.1 (1.89)	38.4 (1.51)	36.3 (1.43)	44.6 (1.76)	48.4 (1.91)	59.8 (2.35)	53.5 (2.11)	59.5 (2.34)	50.5 (1.99)	62.4 (2.46)	56.6 (2.23)	54.6 (2.15)	612.6 (24.12)
Average precipitation days (≥ 1.0 mm)	10.9	9.5	9.3	9.0	8.6	9.4	9.1	9.6	8.7	10.3	11.3	11.0	116.7
Mean monthly sunshine hours	65.1	83.7	124.2	163.0	209.2	191.6	202.2	187.6	151.1	113.6	74.4	65.6	1,631.3
Source 1: Met Office
Source 2: Starlings Roost Weather

== History ==
=== Prehistoric, Roman and early Saxon settlements ===
A Bronze Age flint scraper and two pottery sherds from the same period have been uncovered at Holdingham. Lincoln Road, connecting Sleaford and Lincoln, may have Roman origins, although the stretch between Sleaford and Brauncewell (via Holdingham) could be prehistoric. East of the settlement is a suspected Roman villa and skeletons have been uncovered with Romano-British pottery to the south-west; coins and pottery recovered in archaeological investigations date between the 2nd and 4th centuries AD. Along with ditches and gullies, the remains of early and middle Anglo-Saxon enclosures and post-built buildings have been uncovered east of Holdingham Roundabout (on the sites where the McDonald's restaurant and the Furlong Way housing development have since been built); finds included sherds of pottery, much of it produced locally though some from as far away as Leicestershire. Animal bones, loom weights, querns, metal-working waste, remains of crops and domestic waste were also uncovered. The site dwindled in size and was "largely abandoned" in the 9th century; it probably reverted to agricultural use and it is possible that the settlement shifted to the present location of the hamlet on the western side of Lincoln Road. Its decline may also reflect the growing importance of Sleaford.

=== Later farming village ===
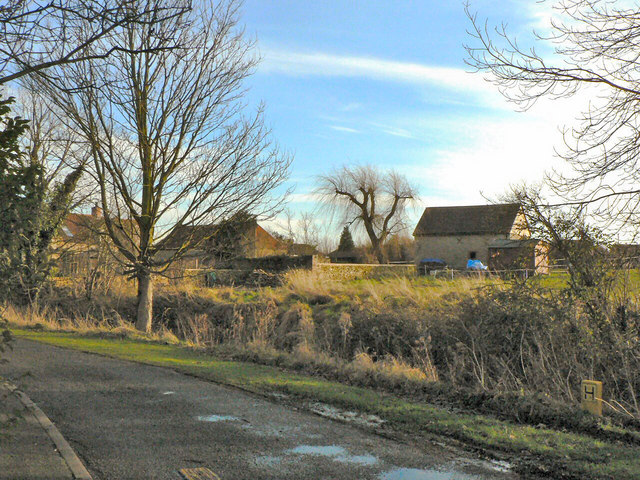
Cottages and fields in the hamlet of Holdingham

The word Holdingham derives from the personal name Hald and the Old English words -inga and -ham, together meaning "Homestead of Hald's family or followers", as the place name historian A. D. Mills puts it. The place name scholars Kenneth Cameron and John Ingsley make him Halda and his followers the Haldingas. Either way, this implies a pre-conquest origin, though the earliest record of the name does not occur until c. 1202. Although not mentioned in the Domesday Book, it was probably a dependent part of the Bishop of Lincoln's manor in Sleaford. In the mid-12th century, the Bishops of Lincoln encouraged trade at New Sleaford (as it became known); they granted it limited liberties and burgage tenure. An estate survey of 1258, however, shows that tenants in Holdingham held land described as tofts and bovates, implying that it remained a centre of demesne farming. The arrangement of the manor's open fields around the settlement add credence to this, suggesting, as local historian Simon Pawley wrote, that Holdingham was "the agricultural focus" of the Bishop's estate at Sleaford. By 1334, the settlement was valued at £2 16s. 3¼d. It remained a part of the Bishop's estate until Bishop Holbeach alienated it to the Crown in 1540. Mary I granted it to Edward Clinton, Lord Clinton and later Earl of Lincoln, who sold it to Robert Carre in 1559. It passed through his family and then, by marriage, to the Earls (later Marquesses) of Bristol.

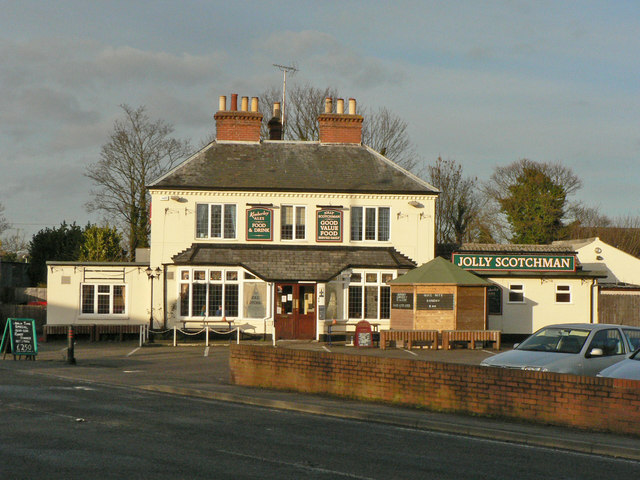
The Jolly Scotchman public house

In medieval and early modern times, the settlement was arranged into closes, fenced-in (enclosed) plots of land. St Mary's Chapel served the inhabitants from at least 1340, when it is first recorded, until around 1550, around which time it fell into ruin. Its location is unknown. To the west, the land south of Newark Road was part of the Anna (or Annah) Common. (Note: The clergyman Rev. Richard Yerburgh suggested that this name derived from the Latin word Hamma, meaning home close or meadow. The Victorian clergyman and antiquarian Edward Trollope speculates that it referred instead to anchorage.) The earliest surviving map of Holdingham dates from 1776 and shows the arrangement of closes, surrounded by open fields (Town Furlong to the south, Waze Furlong to the far east and Walnut Tree Furlong to the east, immediately beneath the row of small closes that lined the drove to Sleaford Moor). In 1794 the Marquess of Bristol enclosed the open fields; he had by far the largest stake in them, at c. 1,000 acres, against the combined 96 acres divided between seven other men. In order to compensate inhabitants with grazing rights, Lord Bristol allocated them land on Sleaford Moor, to the east of Holdingham. The Vicar of Sleaford was allocated a farm on the Anna to compensate for the loss of his tithes.

By the 16th century, the route through Holdingham was used by drovers bringing their cattle from Scotland down to London via Norfolk. The Green Dragon, a public house at Holdingham, sat on four acres of land which drovers used to put their cattle to pasture while they stopped there for a drink just before the tollgate at Sleaford. It was renamed The Jolly Scotchman in 1821, possibly because of this link.

In 1825, Holdingham had eighteen houses and a number of tenements for the poor; together, these housed 25 families. Although anciently a hamlet in the parish of New Sleaford, Holdingham appointed its own parish officers in the early 19th century. In 1866, Holdingham was reorganised into its own civil parish (though the ecclesiastical parish boundaries remained unchanged); at the next census in 1871, it had 27 inhabited houses, 31 families and a population of 143. Over the next seventy years, the parish population stayed fairly static before declining slightly; there were only 75 people living in 22 houses in 1951.

=== Modern developments ===
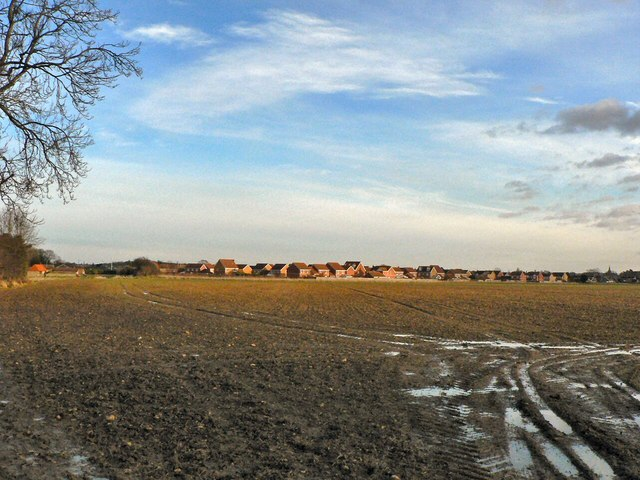
The modern housing estates viewed from fields west of Holdingham

A petrol filling station had been built on Lincoln Road, just south of the hamlet, by at least the 1960s; in 1972, this was taken over by Hockmeyer Motors, who later replaced it with a modern filling station. (Note: The garage's owners opened a café in a converted barn adjacent to the site in 2018.) In 1975, Sleaford's eastern bypass opened, which included the construction of Holdingham Roundabout immediately north of the hamlet and at the intersection of the A15, Lincoln Road and the A17, the latter of which was diverted out of the town and east to Kirkby la Thorpe on a new road. The town's western bypass was added in 1993, which diverted the A15 around Sleaford from Holdingham Roundabout south to Silk Willoughby. In the early 1990s, a service station opened at Holdingham roundabout with a hotel and restaurant, and a fast food restaurant opened near the roundabout in 2001. (Note: In 1990, Trusthouse Forte UK were granted permission to build a hotel, services and a petrol station on a site on the north-west; Little Chef opened there in 1991, joined by a Travelodge. McDonald's opened a restaurant on the site to the south-east in 2001.)

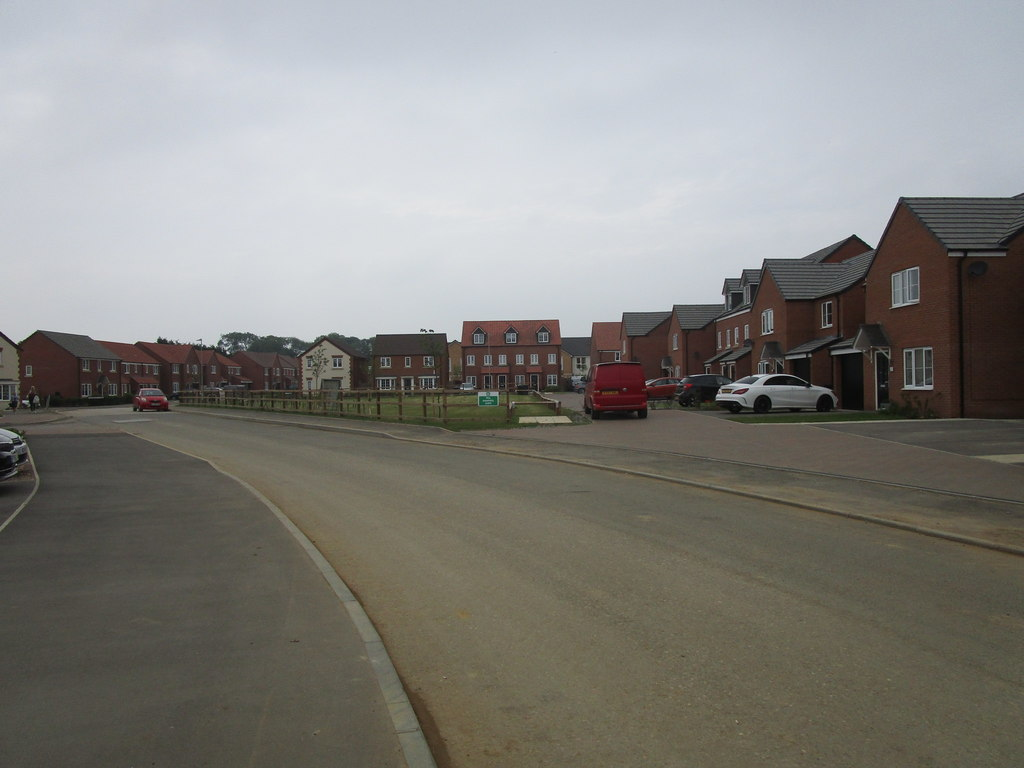
Housing at Whittle Road, Holdingham, built in the late 2010s

From the 1930s onwards, Sleaford's urban area gradually encroached northwards along either side of Lincoln Road: the private North Parade development on the west was built in the 1930s and the interwar and postwar social housing on the east were built near Holdingham's parish boundaries. (Note: Pawley 1996, p. 120 gives the dates of the interwar North Parade and Jubilee Grove developments. For the post-war developments, see North Kesteven District Council 2010, fig. 8 (overleaf from page 5). Compare with the parish boundaries shown in a 1970 Ordnance Survey map of the area.) The Marquess of Bristol still owned almost all of the agricultural land in the parish before the 1960s, but then began selling it off, which allowed speculative development to take place around the town including at Holdingham. Suburban housing on St Denys Avenue was built c. 1968, north of the North Parade estate and within the parish boundaries. The parish was merged with New Sleaford, Old Sleaford and Quarrington in 1974 to form the current Sleaford civil parish. In the early 1970s, another speculative estate was built within the Holdingham boundaries adjoining the council housing on the east side of Lincoln Road. (Note: This was finished by 1975.) The Woodside Avenue estate was also built in the late 1970s, adjoining the Jubilee Grove estate to the north-east.

In 1987, the district council designated as development land sites between St Denys' Avenue and Holdingham village on the west side of Lincoln Road, and between Durham Avenue, the Woodside Avenue estate and Holdingham village on the east side. These lands were developed for private housing in the 1990s and early 2000s, effectively making Holdingham part of Sleaford's contiguous urban area. (Note: Planning permission was granted in 1987–91 for private housing developments off Durham Avenue on the east of Lincoln Road totalling 212 homes (Note: A further 16 homes were fully approved in 2002.) and most of the estate was complete by 1996. Full planning permission was granted to developers for the construction of 174 houses on the west side of Lincoln Road in 1991 and 1995, and these houses were mostly finished by late 2001.) As the local historian Simon Pawley remarked in the late 1990s, Holdingham had "begun to look more like a suburb of Sleaford than a village in its own right" as a result of these developments. In the early 2010s, further development took place, (Note: In 2008 Nottingham Community Housing Association was granted permission to build 97 houses on the greenfield site east of McDonalds, which was largely complete by 2011.) followed over the next decade by almost 300 houses and a new nursing home at Holdingham Grange, east of the McDonald's and bounded to the north by the A17 bypass. (Note: Outline planning permission was granted to a private house-builder in 2014 for the erection of 290 houses and a 70-bed nursing home on land to the east of this development, which was completed over the late 2010s and early 2020s. the number was reduced to 286 three years later. The rest of the housing development, known as Holdingham Grange, was partially complete as of 2019.) The care home opened in 2018.

=== Future ===
The Sleaford Masterplan, produced in 2011 for North Kesteven District Council, designated large tracts of land between the existing housing and the A15 bypass as potential housing sites for the period to 2036. In 2017, planning permission was granted to the Drove Landowners Partnership to build 1,400 homes, two schools, a hotel, a community centre and shops on this land, spanning from Holdingham to The Drove; they expected it to be built in phases, with completion in the early 2030s.

== Economy ==
=== Context ===
The Sleaford built-up area is the urban centre of the North Kesteven district, and one of the district's centres of employment. According to a local authority report, Sleaford is also "the main retail, service and employment centre for people living in the town and in the surrounding villages". Retail, services and distribution make up 22% of the town's workforce.

The public sector is the predominant form of employment in Sleaford civil parish; public administration, education and healthcare collectively account for 29% of the workforce. Sleaford houses the headquarters of North Kesteven District Council, as well as four primary schools and three secondary schools, and is near the Royal Air Force bases at Cranwell, Digby and Waddington which are major employers in the district. Many of North Kesteven's residents also commute out of the district to work, including at Lincoln, Grantham and Newark-on-Trent.

Sleaford also includes one of the district council's three "strategic employment locations", Sleaford Enterprise Park, which lies within the Sleaford Holdingham ward. According to Google Maps, the enterprise park in 2024 housed at least 40 businesses, including three manufacturers, 10 retailers or wholesalers, three vehicle dealerships, two plant hire outlets, six skilled trades (including four vehicle repair shops), a play centre, a restaurant, a training centre, and other services. The Sleaford Household Waste Recycling Centre is also on the site. Still within the ward boundaries but to the east of East Road are buildings housing at least 10 other organisations, including a veterinary clinic, a wholesaler, a training centre, and offices serving an NHS administration. Immediately adjacent but outside of the ward boundaries are other business parks and industrial estates housing companies, including retailers, wholesalers, services and manufacturing concerns.

=== Workforce (Sleaford Holdingham ward) ===
According to the 2021 census, 63.9% of the Sleaford Holdingham ward's residents aged 16 and over were economically active, compared with 58.6% for all of England. 61.6% were in employment, compared with 55.7% nationally. The proportion of long-term sick or disabled was 4.6%, slightly higher than England's 4%; 2.3% of people were economically active but unemployed, very slightly lower than the rate in all of England (2.9%). The proportion of retirees was 18.8%, lower than the national rate (21.5%). Of residents over 16 and in employment, 74.5% were in full-time employment, compared to 70.2% nationally.

The 2021 census revealed that the most common industry that the ward's residents worked in was wholesale and retail trade and the repair of motor vehicles (16.7%, slightly higher than England's population as a whole at 15%). Human health and social work activities accounted for 15.6%, slightly higher than the national rate (14.6%). Public administration and defence was overrepresented among the ward's population, accounting for 12.4% of workers compared with 5.8% nationally. The proportion of people working in manufacturing (10.9%) was also higher than in England as whole (7.3%). No other sectors accounted for more than 10% of the workforce, with the next highest being construction (8.2%), education (7.9%), transport and storage (6%), and accommodation and food services (5.7%). Professional and scientific activities were underrepresented (at 2.8% against 6.7% nationally). The proportion of people working in financial services (1.7%) was less than half of the rate nationally (3.8%).

The census also showed that 10.1% of the working population were managers, directors or senior officials, and 13.4% were professionals, both lower than the figures for England as a whole (12.9% and 20.3% respectively); 15.3% were associate professionals or people employed in technical occupations, slightly higher than the national figure (13.3%). A further 9.5% of people were in administrative or secretarial jobs, almost the same as in England (9.3%), while 11% were in skilled trades (slightly higher than in England as a whole, at 10.2%). Relative to England, a similar proportion of residents worked in caring, leisure or other service occupations (10.1%), but there were higher rates of employment as sales and customer service jobs (8.5% compared with 7.5%), process, plant and machine operatives (9.8% against 6.9% nationally) and in elementary occupations (12.2% compared with 10.5% nationally). In more detailed data from the 2011 census, there was wide variation within the ward; 20% of workers on the Stokes Drive estate were in professional jobs, whereas the rate was 3% on some parts of the Jubilee Grove estate; in the latter areas, up to 24% of workers were in elementary occupations, compared with 10% of workers on the Stokes Drive estate.

In 2021, 61.2% of residents commuted to work in a car or van, much higher than the rate nationally (44.5%); 19.4% were working mainly from home, lower than England's 31.5%. Most other residents in the ward commuted to work on foot (10%).

== Demographics ==
=== Population change ===
There were 20 families living in Holdingham in 1563, according to the diocesan returns of worshippers. This had increased to 25 families in 1825. The 1801 census recorded 113 residents, which rose to 198 in 1841. This fell to 143 in 1871, 120 in 1881 and 89 in 1891, before increasing slightly to 95 in 1901. It rose slightly to 101 in 1921 and 107 ten years later, but had dropped back to 75 by 1951. The parish was merged into Sleaford in 1974. Since the 1990s, the hamlet has been incorporated into the built-up area of Sleaford. The modern ward of Sleaford Holdingham (which has different boundaries to former parish) had a total population of 2,774 in 2011; this accounted for 16% of the population of Sleaford (17,671). By 2021, the ward's population had risen to 3,709.

=== Ethnicity, country of origin and religion ===
According to the 2021 census, the population of Sleaford Holdingham ward was 96% white, 1% Asian or Asian British, 2% mixed or multi-ethnic, and 0.3% black, African, Caribbean or black British, while 0.6% identified with other ethnicities. This implies that the ward was more ethnically homogenous than England as a whole, where 81% of people were white, 10% Asian or Asian British, 3% mixed, 4% black, African, Caribbean or black British, and 2% other. Ward-level data about country of birth has not been released for the 2021 census; in 2011, approximately 93% of the ward's residents were born in the United Kingdom (88% in England), 0.4% in Ireland, 4% elsewhere in the European Union (3% in post-2001 accession states), and 3% in other countries; this made the population much more UK-born than England as a whole, where 86% of the population were born in the UK, 1% in Ireland, 4% in the rest of the EU and 9% elsewhere. In 96% of households, all people aged over 16 had English as their first language.

In the 2021 census, 53.6% of Sleaford Holdingham's population reported following a religion (compared with England's rate of 58.6%); 52.1% of the population were Christian, with approximately 56 people belonging to other religions; the proportion of Christians was higher than in England, where 46.3% were Christian, 6.7% were Muslim and 4.3% belong to other religions.

=== Household composition, age, health and housing ===
In 2021, 48% of the ward's population were male and 52% female. There were 1,526 households in the ward: 28.0% single-person households, 68.0% one-family households, and 4.0% other types; the rate of single-person households was below England's level (30.1%) and the proportion of one-family households was higher than in England generally (68%).

Data on average age has not been published at ward level for the 2021 census. In 2011, the mean age in the ward was 38.2 years and the median 39; the latter was slightly younger than England's national average. In 2021, 22.8% of the ward's residents were under 16 (compared to 18.5% in England), while 15.2% were aged 65 and over (below England's 18.3%). 81.5% of the population reported being in very good or good health (very similar to England's 82.2% rate) and an additional 12.8% reported being in fair health, almost the same as the national rate (12.7%).

According to the 2021 census, a slightly higher proportion of the ward's residents own their own homes with or without a mortgage (64%) than in England as a whole (62.3%). At 20.4%, a greater proportion of people in the ward socially rent (the figure is 17.1% nationally). 15.6% of residents rent privately or live rent-free; this is lower than in England as a whole (20.6%). 39.6% of houses in the ward were detached, much higher than England's rate (22.9%); only 1.6% were purpose-built flats or tenants, compared to 17% across the whole of England; 40.8% of the houses in the ward were semi-detached and a further 17.7% were terraced. Proportionally more households have a car or van (85.3%) than in England as a whole (76.5%).

=== Deprivation ===
For measuring deprivation, the Sleaford Holdingham ward is divided into two statistical units called Lower Super Output Areas (LSOAs). The 2010 Indices of Multiple Deprivation showed that the ward contains both the second-most deprived and sixth-least deprived LSOAs in North Kesteven (out of 60 such statistical units). The data from the 2019 update showed that there remained a disparity between the two areas; the LSOA which covered all the lands east of Lincoln Road (excluding part of the Durham Avenue estate and all of the Furlong Way estate) ranked among the 40% most deprived LSOAs nationally. By contrast, the LSOA covering the rest of the ward ranked among the 20% least deprived areas in the country.

== Government and politics ==
=== Local government ===
Holdingham was a hamlet in the ancient parish of New Sleaford, part of Kesteven's Flaxwell wapentake. It was incorporated into Sleaford Poor Law Union. In 1866, Holdingham was created as a separate civil parish. The Public Health Act 1872 established urban sanitary districts (USD) and Holdingham became part of the Sleaford USD, which in turn was reorganised into Sleaford Urban District (UD) in 1894. Sleaford UD was abolished by the Local Government Act 1972 and, by statutory instrument, Sleaford civil parish became its successor, thus merging Quarrington, New Sleaford, Old Sleaford and Holdingham civil parishes.

Since 1998, Holdingham has fallen within the Sleaford Holdingham wards in Sleaford Town Council and North Kesteven District Council; it is represented by two councillors on the town council and one councillor in the district. The settlement also falls within the Lincolnshire County Council electoral division of Sleaford, which is represented by one councillor.

=== National and European politics ===
Before 1832, Holdingham was in the Lincolnshire parliamentary constituency. In 1832, the Reform Act divided Lincolnshire. Holdingham was placed in the South Lincolnshire constituency that elected two members to parliament. The constituency was abolished in 1885 and Holdingham was in the new Sleaford (or North Kesteven) constituency. It merged with the Grantham seat in 1918. In 1995, Holdingham was reorganised into Sleaford and North Hykeham, effective from the 1997 general election. The incumbent is Caroline Johnson, who has held it since the 2016 by-election and was re-elected with 36% of the vote in 2024.

Lincolnshire elected a Member of the European Parliament from 1974 until 1994, and then became part of the Lincolnshire and Humberside South constituency until 1999; it then elected members as part of the East Midlands constituency until the United Kingdom withdrew from the European Union in 2020.

== Transport ==
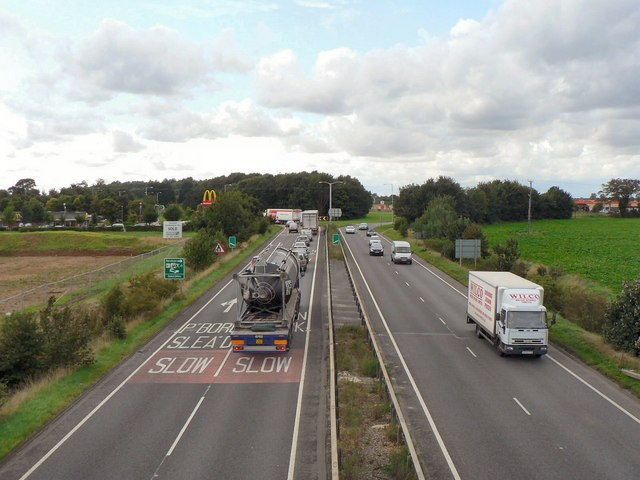
The approach to Holdingham roundabout, viewed looking westwards on the A17. Services can be seen either side of the roundabout.

The A17 road from Newark-on-Trent to King's Lynn bypasses Sleaford from Holdingham Roundabout to Kirkby la Thorpe. It ran through the town until the bypass opened in 1975. The Holdingham roundabout connects the A17 to the A15 road from Peterborough to Scawby. It also passed through Sleaford until 1993, when its bypass was completed.

The nearest railway station is at Sleaford, which is a stop on the Peterborough to Lincoln Line and the Poacher Line, from Grantham to Skegness. Grantham, roughly 14 3/4 miles (23.7 kilometres) by road and two stops on the Poacher Line, is a major stop on the East Coast Main Line. Trains from Grantham to London King's Cross take approximately 1 hour 15 minutes.

== Education ==
The Sleaford Holdingham Ward does not contain any schools or other educational facilities. Education is provided in Sleaford, where there are four primary schools. The nearest are Church Lane School (on Church Lane) and Our Lady of Good Counsel Roman Catholic Primary School (on the Drove); there is also the William Alvey Church of England Primary School on Eastgate and St Botolph's Church of England Primary School in Quarrington. There are also primary schools in the nearby villages of Leasingham, Kirkby la Thorpe and North Rauceby.

There are three secondary schools in Sleaford, each with sixth forms: Carre's Grammar School, a boys' grammar school and selective academy; Kesteven and Sleaford High School, a selective academy and girls' grammar school; and St George's Academy, a mixed non-selective comprehensive school and academy. The grammar schools are selective and pupils are required to pass the eleven-plus exam. St George's is not academically selective. The co-educational Sleaford Joint Sixth Form consortium allows pupils to choose sixth form courses taught at all three schools regardless of which one they are based at.

== Religion ==
Holdingham had a chapel in the Middle Ages, which was last in use in the 1550s; it subsequently disappeared and its location is not known with certainty. As of 2020, Sleaford provides the focus for religious worship. Anglican services normally take place at St Denys' Church, by the town's market place; Holdingham falls within the ecclesiastical parish of New Sleaford. There is a Catholic church (Our Lady of Good Counsel) on Jermyn Street. Sleaford United Reformed Church and the Sleaford Community Church merged in 2008 to form the Sleaford Riverside Church, which meets at premises on Southgate. Sleaford Methodist Church is located on Northgate. New Life Church Ministries have a centre on Mareham Lane. The Salvation Army has a chapel on West Banks. The Sleaford Muslim Community Association has a prayer hall on Station Road. Sleaford Spiritualist Church operates on Westgate.

== Historic buildings ==
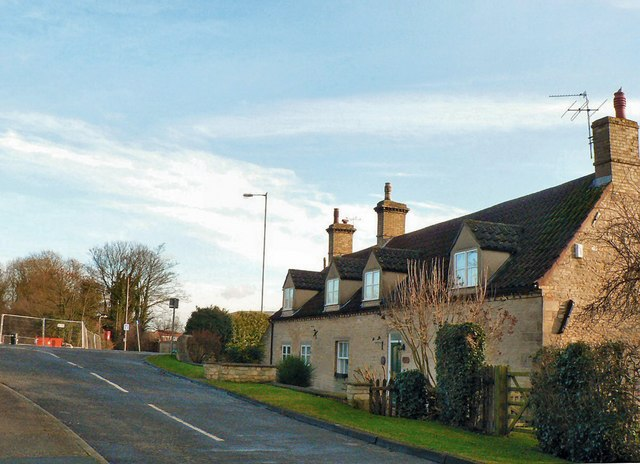
Cottages in Holdingham, beside Lincoln Road (the B1518)

There are seven listed buildings in Holdingham. Three entries are in the hamlet itself: the 17th- or early-18th-century cottage 1, Holdingham; the 18th-century building at 12, Holdingham; and the mid-18th-century buildings at 13 and 14, Holdingham. To the west of the settlement is the 17th- or early 18th-century Anna House Farmhouse and outbuildings. To the farthest west in the former parish boundaries are the late-18th-century Holdingham Farmhouse and adjoining mill buildings. In addition to the listed buildings, several others are recorded as having "local interest", including nos. 7–11, Holdingham.

== Notable residents ==
Holdingham gave its name to Richard de Haldingham and Lafford (died 1278), the donor and possible author of the Hereford Mappa Mundi.

== Bibliography ==
- Brand, Anthony; Pawley, Simon (2024), Celebrating Fifty (PDF), Sleaford: Sleaford Town Council, archived from the original (PDF) on 15 May 2024.
- Cameron, Kenneth; Ingsley, John (1998), A Dictionary of Lincolnshire Place-Names, Nottingham: English Place Name Society, ISBN 978-0-904889-58-1.
- Census Office (1872), Census of England and Wales, 1871: Population Tables: Area, Houses and Inhabitants, vol. 1, London: George Edward Eyre and William Spottiswoode.
- Census Office (1873), Census of England and Wales, 1871: General Report, vol. 4, London: George Edward Eyre and William Spottiswoode.
- Central Lincolnshire Joint Strategic Planning Committee (2013), Central Lincolnshire Local Plan: Core Strategy: Partial Draft Plan for Consultation: Area Policies for Lincoln, Gainsborough and Sleaford, Lincoln: Central Lincolnshire Joint Planning Unit, archived from the original on 21 May 2024.
- Cope-Faulkner, Paul (2000), Desk-Top Assessment of the Archaeological Implications of Proposed Development of Land Adjacent to Lincoln Road, Holdingham, Sleaford, Lincolnshire (PDF), APS Report, vol. 192/00, Heckington: Archaeological Project Services, doi:10.5284/1014209, archived from the original (PDF) on 21 November 2023.
- Cope-Faulkner, Paul (2006), Archaeological Evaluation on Land at Lincoln Road, Holdingham, Sleaford, Lincolnshire (PDF), APS Report, vol. 110/06, Heckington: Archaeological Project Services, doi:10.5284/1015439, archived from the original (PDF) on 21 November 2023.
- Day, R. A. (1987), Sleaford Interim District Plan: Draft Written Statement, Sleaford: North Kesteven District Council.
- Ekosgen; Turley Economics (2015), Central Lincolnshire Economic Needs Assessment: Final Report (PDF), Manchester: Turley, archived from the original (PDF) on 3 November 2021.
- Gillespies (2011), Sleaford Masterplan: Final Report (PDF), Leeds: Gillespies, archived from the original (PDF) on 6 July 2021.
- Hosford, W. H. (1968). "The Manor of Sleaford in the Thirteenth Century". Nottingham Medieval Studies. 12: 21–39. doi:10.1484/J.NMS.3.37.
- Mahany, Christine M.; Roffe, David (1979), Sleaford, Stamford: South Lincolnshire Archaeological Unit, ISBN 978-0-906295-02-1
- Mills, A. D. (2011). "Holdingham". In Mills, A. D. (ed.). A Dictionary of British Place Names. Oxford: Oxford University Press. p. 242. ISBN 978-0-19-173944-6.
- North Kesteven District Council (2010), Sleaford Masterplan Scoping Report: Final Report, Sleaford: North Kesteven District Council, archived from the original on 17 September 2014.
- North Kesteven District Council (2014), The State of the District (PDF), Sleaford: North Kesteven District Council, archived from the original (PDF) on 8 October 2020
- North Kesteven District Council (2024), North Kesteven District Profile February 2024 (PDF), Sleaford: North Kesteven District Council, archived from the original (PDF) on 25 May 2024.
- Pawley, Simon (1996), The Book of Sleaford, Finmere: Baron Birch for Quotes Ltd., ISBN 978-0-86023-559-0.
- Redmonds, George (2007), Names and History: People, Places and Things, London: Bloomsbury Academic, ISBN 978-1-85285-507-9
- St George's Academy (2019), St George's Academy Admissions Policy, 2019–2020 (PDF), Sleaford: St George's Academy, pp. 4–5, archived from the original (PDF) on 21 May 2024.
- Trollope, Edward (1872), Sleaford and the Wapentakes of Flaxwell and Ashwardhurn, London: W. Kent & Co., OCLC 228661584.
- Yerburgh, Richard (1825), Sketches, Illustrative of the Topography and History of New and Old Sleaford, in the County of Lincoln, and Several Places in the Surrounding Neighbourhood, Sleaford: James Creasey.
- Youngs, Frederic A. (1991), Guide to the Local Administrative Units of England, vol. 2, London: Royal Historical Society, ISBN 978-0-86193-127-9.
