= Little Sutton, Lincolnshire =

Civil parish in Lincolnshire, England

Coordinates: 52.779°N 0.154°E

Little Sutton
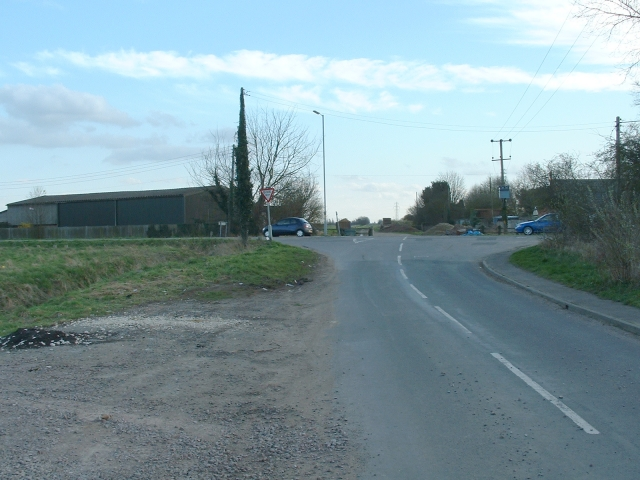
- Crossroads in the parish

- Location within Lincolnshire
- Population: 121 (2001 census)
- OS grid reference: TF4522
  - London: 85 mi (137 km) S
- Civil parish: Little Sutton
- District: South Holland
- Shire county: Lincolnshire
- Region: East Midlands
- Country: England
- Sovereign state: United Kingdom
- Post town: SPALDING
- Postcode district: PE12
- Dialling code: 01406
- Police: Lincolnshire
- Fire: Lincolnshire
- Ambulance: East Midlands
- UK Parliament: South Holland and The Deepings

Little Sutton is a small civil parish, containing a few farms and a few houses, lying between the much larger parishes of Long Sutton and Sutton Bridge, in Lincolnshire, England.

== Geography ==
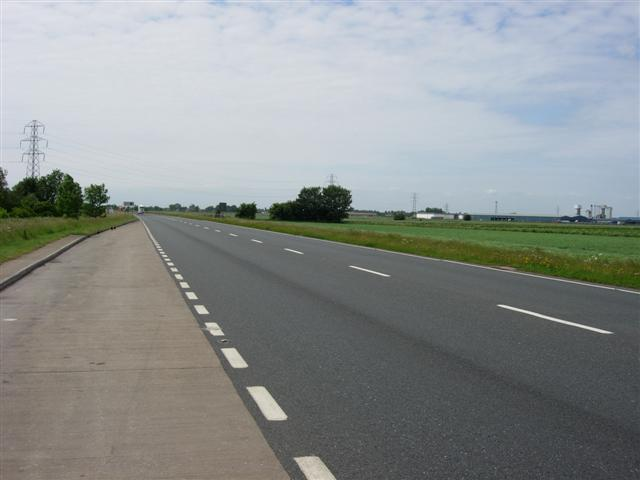
The A17

For Parliamentary, County, and District elections, the parish is taken together with its bigger sibling, Long Sutton. Purely parish matters are dealt with by a parish meeting. On South Holland District Council, it is part of the Long Sutton ward, with Lutton and Tydd. At the 2001 census, 100% of the parish was white, with 87% describing themselves as Christian.

The parish boundary with Long Sutton stretches as far north as Yellow House. West of Maze Farm (outside the parish) it meets Sutton Bridge. It follows Hospital Drove southwards, crossing Woad Lane, past Common Farm. It crosses Bridge Road, the former A17, then further south crosses the busy A17 close to where the pylon line crosses. As Hospital Drove, the boundary meets Tydd St Mary at the South Holland Main Drain. At the A1101 bridge over the drain, it meets Long Sutton, and follows the A1101 Wisbech Road northwards. For 300 metres, it follows Woodward's Lane eastwards, then passes northwards across the A17, west of Hope House. At Hundreds Lane, it passes northwards along the west side of the Premier Foods factory.

== Food production ==
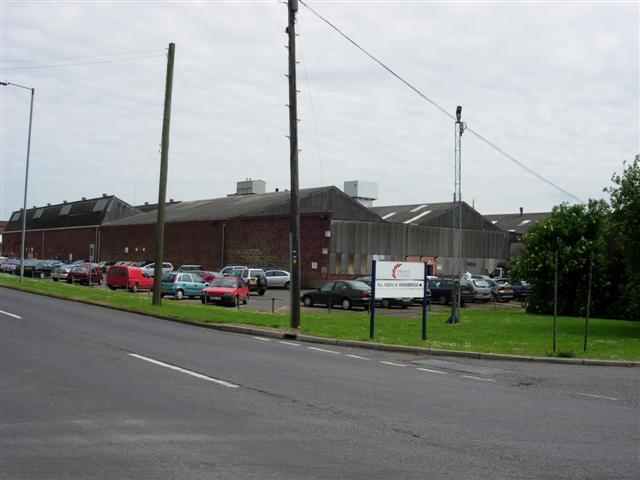
Premier Foods factory, 2010

Premier Foods have a factory on Bridge Road. Princes Foods uses this Long Sutton address for most of its products. The factory uses around 16,000MWh of electricity a year, canning baked beans, vegetables, puddings and meat. It employs over 600.

The factory was acquired by Hillsdown Holdings in 1981, and was used to can vegetables. In 1990 Hillsdown Holdings became HL Foods Ltd, then Premier Foods in November 2002 before becoming Princes Foods.

In December 2001, when known as Premier International Foods, food scientists at the plant created the world's first 'chips in a can' meal, costing 99p each. The team was headed by Dr Malcolm Crouchman. The items were marketed as Omelette, Chips 'N' Beans and Beef Grill 'N' Chips.

== History ==
The civil parish is contained within the religious parish of St Mary, Long Sutton.
