= Cross Keys Bridge =

Swing road bridge in England

Coordinates: 52°46′00″N 0°11′43″E

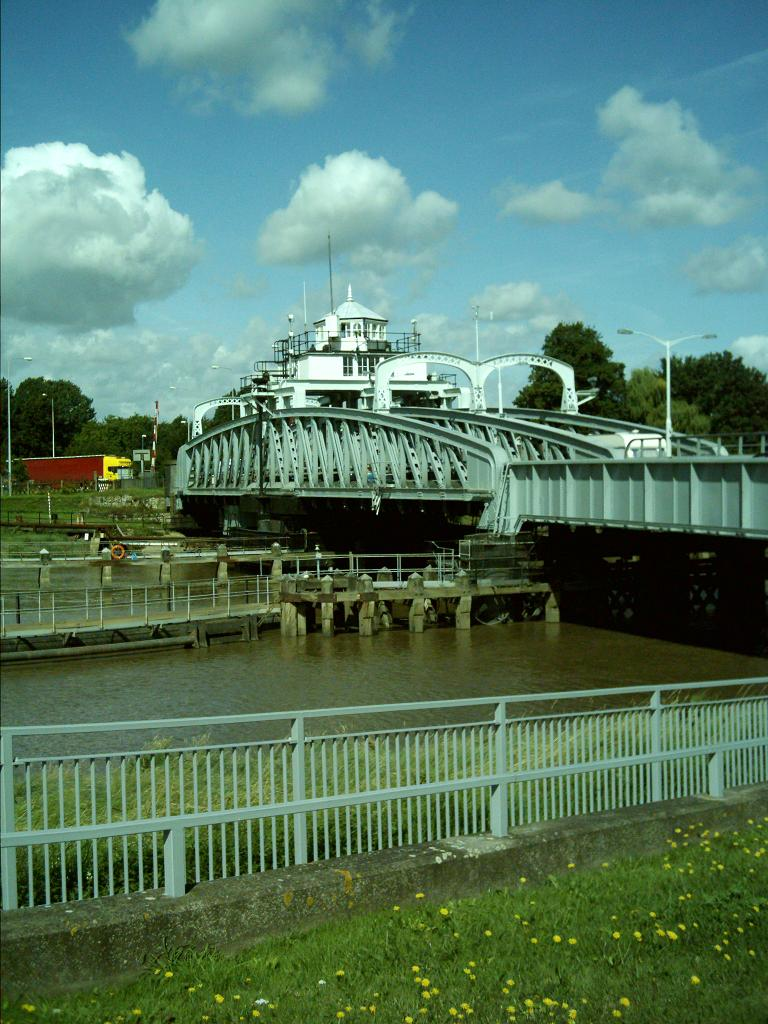
Cross Keys Bridge

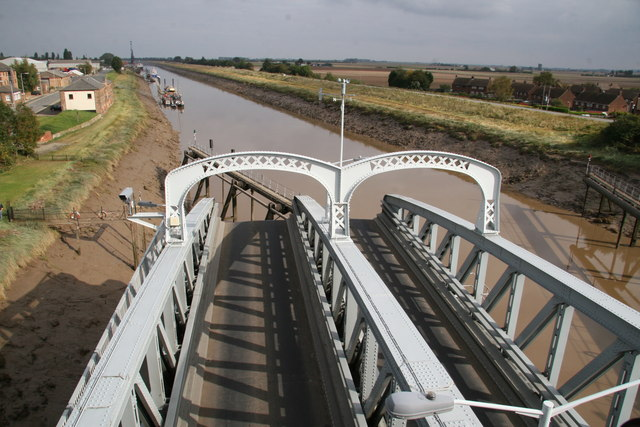
The bridge swung fully

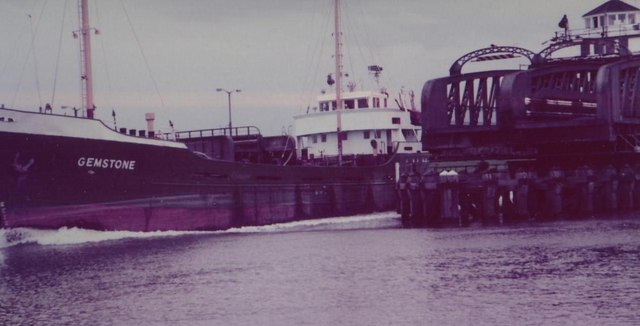
Cross Keys Bridge and a ship heading north (1978)

Cross Keys Bridge is a swing bridge that carries the busy single carriageway A17 road which runs from Newark in Nottinghamshire to King's Lynn in Norfolk over the tidal River Nene in Sutton Bridge in the extreme south east of Lincolnshire close to the borders of both Norfolk and Cambridgeshire and is a major landmark on the route particularly for holiday traffic heading into and out of Norfolk during the summer months.

It is the only crossing point for both traffic and pedestrians over the river north of the Cambridgeshire town of Wisbech some nine miles to the south of the bridge and provides the only direct link between Lincolnshire and Norfolk.

When it was built in 1897, it was the third bridge to cross the Nene in Sutton Bridge. It was originally a dual-purpose bridge serving the Midland and Great Northern Joint Railway on what is now the westbound carriageway and the road was on the eastbound side. The railway line was closed in 1965 and the bridge took on its present-day use as a road bridge with one single lane for eastbound traffic and a single lane for westbound traffic. It is a Grade II* listed structure.

== History ==
The Borough of Wisbech was the port authority for this part of the River Nene. The emblem of Wisbech is the cross keys of St Peter.

The first bridge, opened in 1831, was designed by John Rennie the Younger and Thomas Telford as part of the Wash Embankment works. It was of timber and cast iron construction and opened up rather like London's famous Tower Bridge. However it was found to be awkwardly sited and in 1850, its replacement designed by Robert Stephenson was opened.

Cross Keys Bridge Act 1826
- Act of Parliament
- Parliament of the United Kingdom
- Long title: An Act for constructing a Bridge across Sutton Wash, otherwise called Cross Keys Wash, between the Counties of Lincoln wad Norfolk.\
- Citation: 7 Geo. 4. c. cvi

Dates
- Royal assent: 26 May 1826

Text of statute as originally enacted

Lynn and Sutton Railway (Cross Keys Bridge) Act 1864
- Act of Parliament
- Parliament of the United Kingdom
- Long title: An Act to regulate the Use by the Lynn and Sutton Bridge Railway Company of the Cross Keys Bridge over the River Nene.
- Citation: 27 & 28 Vict. c. ccxxix

Dates
- Royal assent: 25 July 1864

Text of statute as originally enacted

Local shipowner Richard Young, five times Mayor of Wisbech, was responsible for the Cross Keys Bridge Act 1826 (7 Geo. 4. c. cvi). The position of the second bridge was approximately halfway between the original and the present day bridge. It was a swing bridge and was used only for road traffic until the Lynn and Sutton Bridge Railway Act 1863 (26 & 27 Vict. c. cxciii) was passed, which gave the Lynn and Sutton Bridge Railway powers to also use it for rail traffic. When the current bridge was constructed it was hoped that the 1850 bridge could be left in position for rail use however the river authorities decided that two bridges so close together constituted a hazard for shipping, and it was removed.

The present Cross Keys Bridge was built in 1897 at a cost of £80,000. Andrew Handyside and Company erected the bridge and Armstrong Whitworth built the engines which supplied the power to swing the bridge and which were installed in the Hydraulic House, a separately listed Grade II* building. The Hydraulic House is now undergoing conversion to a family home but will retain the hydraulics and accumulators, which are housed in a 40-foot (12 m) high tower.

== Operations ==
The bridge is a notorious bottleneck for traffic within the local area especially during the summer months as significant traffic disruption to the surrounding areas can occur if the bridge is opened to allow shipping to pass through or if major maintenance has to be undertaken for any reason as the only alternative route between Sutton Bridge and King's Lynn is via the A1101 from Long Sutton though the centre of Wisbech itself and the A47.

Tolls were charged on the bridge until 1903. The bridge opens several times a week to allow ships and pleasure craft using the River Nene to pass through to the Port of Wisbech.

== Cultural references ==
The bridge was used during the filming of the 2007 adaptation of Philip Pullman's novel, The Golden Compass.
