= Sutton Bridge =

Town and civil parish in Lincolnshire, England

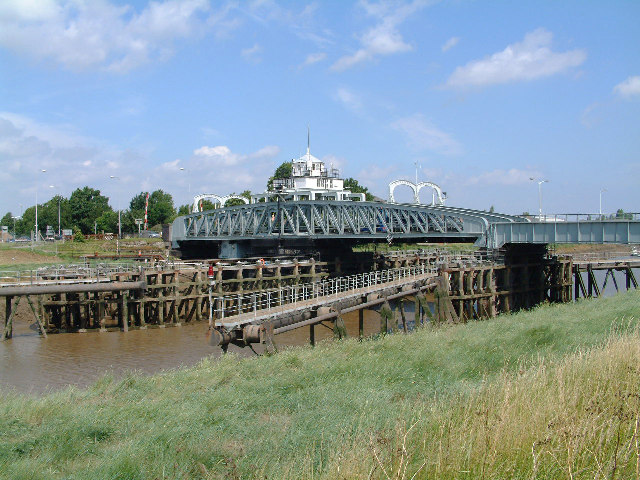
- Cross Keys Bridge

- Location within Lincolnshire
- Population: 4,454 (2011)
- OS grid reference: TF475215
  - London: 85 mi (137 km) S
- District: South Holland
- Shire county: Lincolnshire
- Region: East Midlands
- Country: England
- Sovereign state: United Kingdom
- Post town: SPALDING
- Postcode district: PE12
- Dialling code: 01406
- Police: Lincolnshire
- Fire: Lincolnshire
- Ambulance: East Midlands
- UK Parliament: South Holland and the Deepings
- Website: Sutton Bridge Parish Council Website

Sutton Bridge is a town and civil parish in the South Holland district of Lincolnshire, England. It is situated on the A17 road, 7 miles (11 km) north from Wisbech and 9 miles (14 km) west from King's Lynn. The village includes a commercial dock on the west bank of the River Nene over which spans a swing bridge, and the parish, two 19th-century lighthouses 3 miles (5 km) to the north from the village on the Nene.

== Geography ==
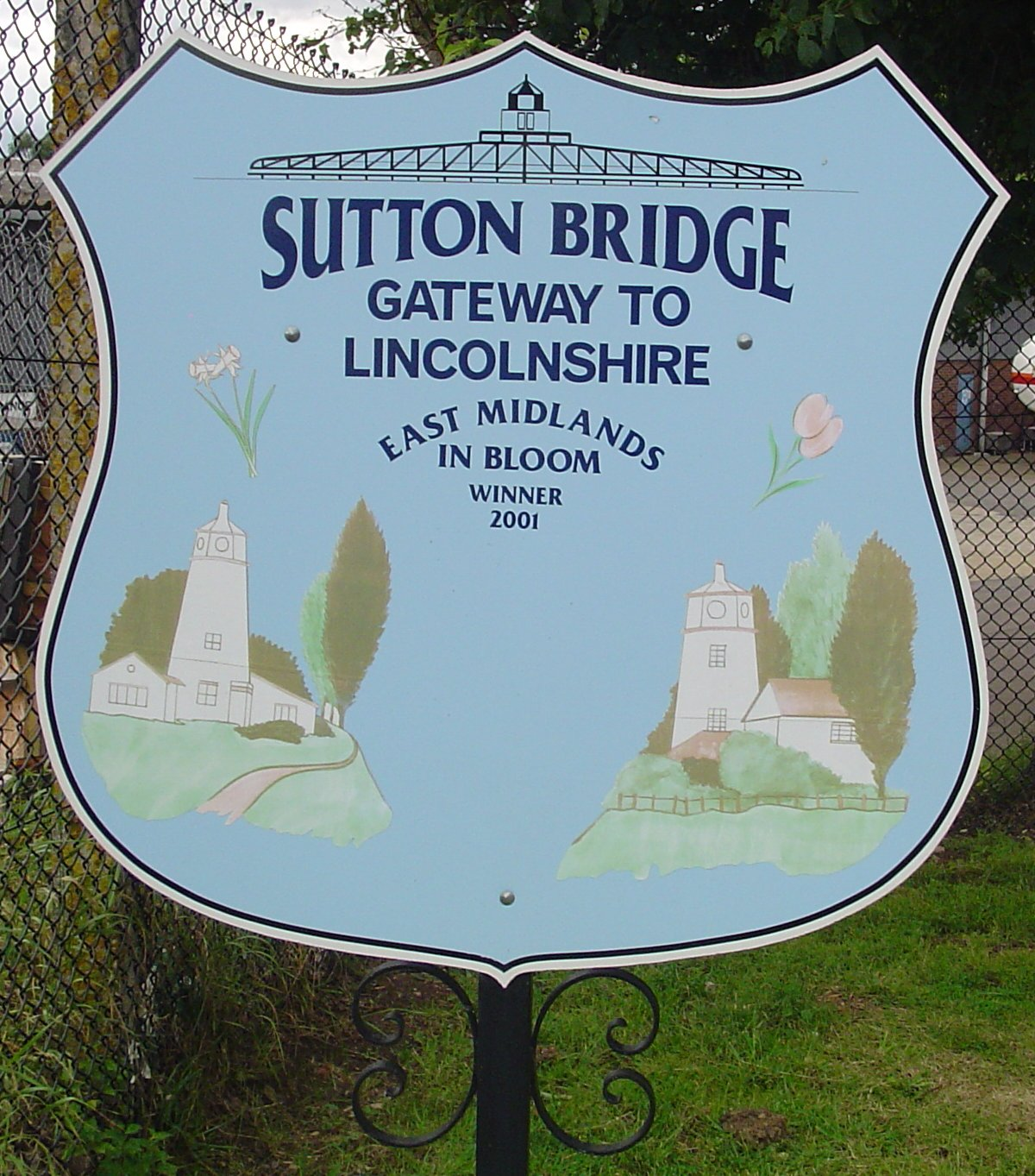
Signpost in Sutton Bridge

The town lies very close to the county borders of both Norfolk and Cambridgeshire in the extreme south east of Lincolnshire. The parish boundary to the east, next to the Wash, meets Terrington St Clement and Norfolk. A mile north of the A17, it meets Walpole Cross Keys. At King John Bank it crosses the A17, meeting Walpole. At the junction of the North Level Main Drain with the River Nene, it follows the Nene northwards, meeting Tydd St Mary (Lincolnshire). At South Holland Bridge it follows South Holland Main Drain westwards to South Holland Lodge, where it meets Little Sutton, and follows Hospital Drove northwards, crossing the A17 where the pylons cross the bypass. It crosses the former A17 next to the large Premier Foods factory. At Maze Farm it briefly meets Long Sutton then meets Lutton. It follows the Lutton Leam eastwards through Old Leam Farm.

Sutton Bridge and the surrounding area has recently seen an influx of new residents, mostly from the southern part of the United Kingdom. This has resulted in a healthy housing construction and improvement plan. In 1999, Sutton Bridge Power Station, a 790 MW gas-fired power station that feeds electricity into the UK's National Grid was opened, it is situated on Centenary Way, close to the River Nene.

In 2024, a 57.3-mile stretch of the King Charles III England Coast Path opened from Sutton Bridge to Skegness. An existing stretch of the England Coast Path reaches Hunstanton.

== History ==
The early 19th-century village consisted of a few farmhouses and cottages straggled along the track which passed for a main road. The parish church is dedicated to St Matthew, and is the only flint church in Lincolnshire.

=== Marshes ===
Stretching to the east and north was a vast, fast flowing expanse of marshes known as Cross Keys Wash, through which the River Nene (earlier, the Wellstream) wound its way to the sea. The whole area is composed of sand and silt, shifting regularly as the water cut new channels. The track across the marshes between Lincolnshire and Norfolk was passable at low water and needed a guide for a safe passage. Livestock, travellers, wagons and coaches were lost into the quicksand of the marshes.

Since reclamation began in the 16th century of the estuary between Long Sutton and Sutton Bridge, The Wash House (now the Bridge Hotel) marked the start of the safe track and it was possible to hire guides to help the general travellers and also the drovers with their herds of cattle, flocks of sheep or geese safely over the marsh.

=== King John losing the Crown Jewels ===
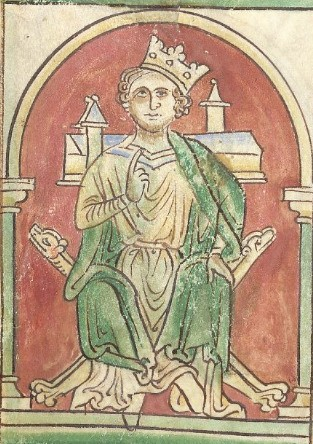
King John of England (1166–1216)

It was recorded by contemporary chroniclers that on 12 October 1216 King John's crown jewels and other valuable crown possessions were lost in marshland when the horse-drawn baggage train of his army, in passing from Bishop's Lynn (now King's Lynn) en route to Sleaford, attempted to cross the causeway and ford across the mouth of the Wellstream without a guide. John, on departing from Bishop's Lynn, had apparently chosen the safer route via Wisbech in the Isle of Ely. The baggage train route was usable only at low tide. The horse-drawn wagons moved too slowly for the incoming tide or flood tide, and most were lost with only a few men surviving. The king died a week later of dysentery, and was succeeded to the throne by his 9-year-old son, Henry III.

The location of the incident is usually supposed to be somewhere near the site of Sutton Bridge, on the River Nene. The name of the river changed as a result of the redirection of the Great Ouse during the 17th century, and Bishop's Lynn became King's Lynn as a result of Henry VIII's rearrangement of the English Church.

During the early part of the 20th century, several privately sponsored archaeological attempts were made to discover the exact location of King John's long-lost treasure, on 10 miles (16 km) of reclaimed land between Sutton Bridge and Wisbech. Modern scientific equipment, such as the magnetic variometer method were implemented, from the headquarters of Fen Research Ltd., located at Dovecote Farm in Walpole St. Peter, which had been purposely formed to search for King John's treasure. The research company was financially sponsored by the wealthy American James R. H. Boone of Baltimore, and included on the board Sir Francis Hill and Sir R. E. Mortimer Wheeler, keeper of the London Museum.

In 2021 it was reported in the local newspaper that another treasure hunter had claimed to have found the location of the treasure.

=== Railway ===
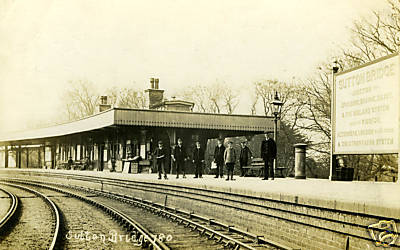
Sutton Bridge railway station, early 20th century

The first railway reached the village in 1862 with Sutton Bridge railway station. The actual operation of the railways caused problems when ships were using the river. With no radio communication between the two, news of the approaching ship depended on visual warning.

=== The Great War ===
A war memorial to those who gave their lives for their country 1914-1918 was erected in the churchyard of St Matthew's church. The war memorials online website states that the names of 48 men are inscribed on the memorial and also those from the Second World War.

== Port Sutton Bridge ==
Sutton Bridge Dock Act 1875
- Act of Parliament
- Parliament of the United Kingdom
- Long title: An Act for incorporating a Company, and authorising them to make and maintain a Dock and other works at Sutton Bridge; and for other purposes.
- Citation: 38 & 39 Vict. c. ccvii

Dates
- Royal assent: 11 August 1875

Text of statute as originally enacted

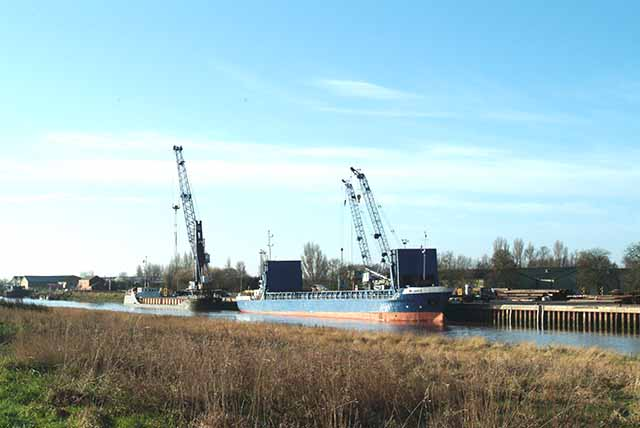
Port Sutton Bridge

The Sutton Bridge Dock Act 1875 (38 & 39 Vict. c. ccvii) authorised the construction of the dock and other necessary works, including connecting the dock to the existing railway. The wet dock was to be some 475 yards (434 m) by 140 yards (130 m) with a lock from the river of 200 by 50 feet (61 by 15 m). The length of the quayside was to be 1,250 yards (1,140 m) with a long timber jetty on the east side. On the west side was to be a coal jetty, equipped with a hydraulic lift to raise coal trucks to tip their loads into ships waiting beneath.

The dock gates weighed 35 tons each and 1.5 million bricks were used in constructing the dock entrance. An area of 13 acres (5.3 ha) was taken up by the dock itself and 600,000 cubic yards (460,000 m^{3}) of soil were excavated. The first sod was cut on 1 January 1878 and 100 men, 50 horses and carts, 1 steam dredger and several barges were involved in the work.

The work was completed and the first ship to enter the dock (SS Garland) did so on 14 May 1881, carrying 1200 tons of cargo destined for Messrs English of Wisbech. The excitement was spoilt somewhat as the dock entrance had not been dredged to a sufficient depth and the ship had to unload some of her cargo before entering the dock. However, towed by the tugs, Pendennis and the Isle of Ely, she floated into the dock. In the following week, four other ships used the dock.

The official opening was planned for 29 June with great public festivities, however on 9 June part of the ground at the south west corner of the lock sank 10 feet (3.0 m), leaving the concrete facing unsupported. At the same time, a strip of earth at the back of the lock on the north side sank, carrying with it, two steam traction engines which had been used for pumping. They were buried 10 feet (3.0 m) deep in the silt. Frantic efforts were made to repair the damage. Trainloads of sand, silt, rubble, clay and limestone were poured into the gaps to no avail. On the following Tuesday 500 feet (150 m) of concrete facing on the opposite, west side of the dock itself were dislodged because the footings had been scoured away. On Wednesday, many more yards of the concrete cracked and subsided. All three ships which had been in the dock had got away safely with some difficulty. The great weight of concrete laid on shifting silt, together with inadequate timber piling would appear to have led to the collapse. Efforts to save the dock were soon seen to be futile and the plan was abandoned. The railway company lost a fortune and Sutton Bridge's growth as a port was halted for over 100 years.

Sutton Bridge Golf Club, established in 1914, is a nine-hole golf course in and around the abandoned dock basin. The concrete walls of the dock, some 15 feet high, form part of the course.

The modern Port Sutton Bridge opened in 1987. It is a 62-acre dry cargo port and warehouse complex. The port provides a 350 metre long wharf accommodating between four and five vessels, with a maximum vessel length of 120 metres and 17 metre beam. Vessels up to 5,000 DWT, with a draught of 6 metres can be accommodated at spring tide.

== Swing bridge ==
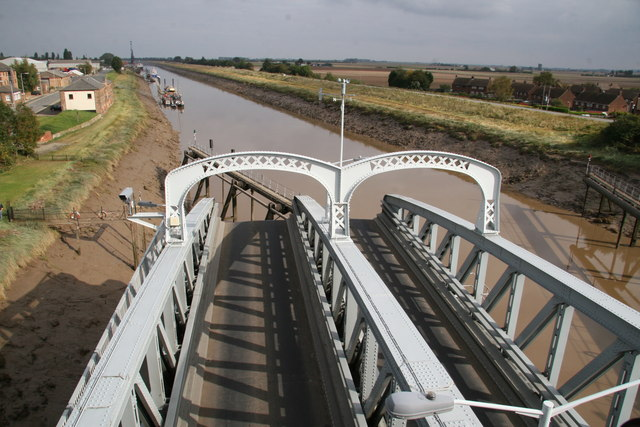
Cross Keys Bridge – swung open

The swing bridge which spans the River Nene is a notable feature of the town and the current version, known as Cross Keys Bridge, was built in 1897 at a cost of £80,000 and is the third bridge to cross the river. The bridge was originally dual purpose, serving both road and rail traffic until 1959 when the railway closed.

The first bridge, opened in 1831, was designed by John Rennie the Younger and Thomas Telford as part of the Wash Embankment works. It was of a timber and cast iron construction and opened up rather like London's famous Tower Bridge. However it was eventually found to be awkwardly sited and in 1850, its replacement designed by Robert Stephenson was opened.

The position of the second bridge was approximately halfway between the original and the present day bridge. It was a swing bridge and was used only for road traffic until 1864 when the Midland Railway acquired powers to also use it for rail traffic. When the current bridge was constructed it was hoped that the 1850 bridge could be left in position for rail use but the river authorities decided that two bridges so close together constituted a hazard for shipping, and it was removed.

== Lighthouses ==
Twin lighthouses on the Nene

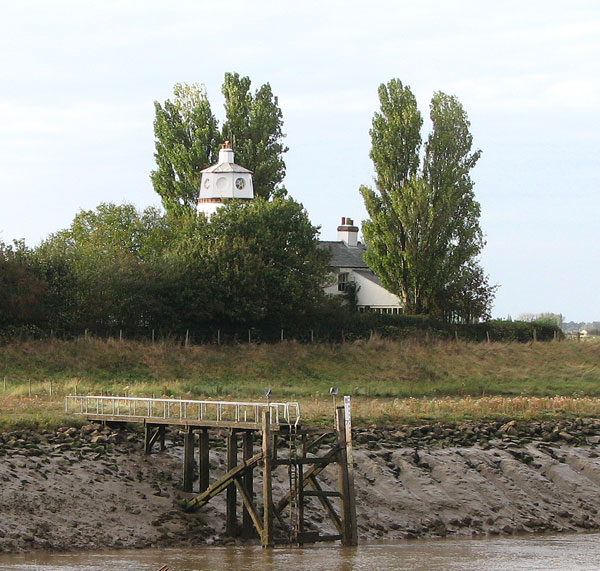
West

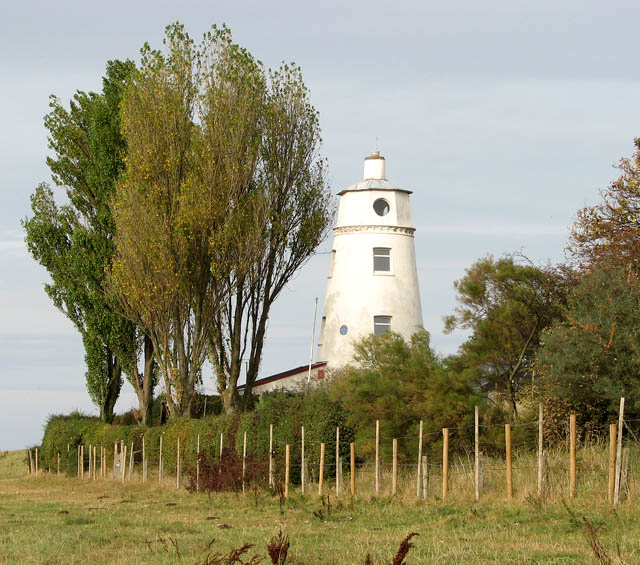
East

Twin lighthouses were built on the banks of the mouth of the River Nene in 1831, to commemorate the opening of the Nene outfall cut (the Commissioners of the Nene Outfall having been given permission to establish lighthouses and beacons without the sanction of Trinity House). In 1861, however, it was officially reported that 'they have never been used, nor are they considered at all necessary, as the system of lighting adopted in this port is found to answer all purposes required'.

Contrary to belief these were lit and acted as lighthouses although they were not lit throughout the night, there being no rocks to protect ships from. The River Nene has however always been an important navigation for shipping and if a high tide occurred after dark, they were lit for approximately one and a half hours before and after high tide to guide ships through the sand banks and into the river. The towers are circular but the top lantern sections are hexagonal. Both have a circular window facing the channel entry. Each has in addition a half moon window to the north on the west bank lighthouse and to the south on the east bank lighthouse. A ship picking up either side light is not in the channel. The side lights would however be used by skilled pilots to triangulate their way through the twisting sand banks by picking them up and losing them.

The East Bank Lighthouse is known as the Sir Peter Scott Lighthouse: before the Second World War it was inhabited by the naturalist and artist Sir Peter Scott who bought a large area of the Ouse Washes and established a nature reserve of what is now the Wildfowl and Wetlands Trust. It also inspired the setting for Paul Gallico's novella The Snow Goose: A Story of Dunkirk.

== Wartime Sutton Bridge ==
The town and community of Sutton Bridge played a supportive role of national importance during the Second World War; it was home to a Royal Air Force (RAF) airfield and prisoner-of-war camp. Its most pivotal role was when Sutton Bridge became the RAF's Central Gunnery School (CGS), training both fighter pilots from RAF Fighter Command and air gunners from RAF Bomber Command, and in the words of Group Captain Allan Wright "the Central Gunnery School itself was the first of its kind in the world".

=== RAF Sutton Bridge ===
On 1 September 1926 the Air Ministry established RAF Practice Camp Sutton Bridge on acquired farmland bordering Sutton Bridge village, adjacent the River Nene, in close vicinity to Cross Keys Bridge. As a gunnery training camp, it was to operate ground and towed targets for live practice machine gun fire and bomb dropping by aircraft, its principal gunnery range was located along the Lincolnshire coast marshland on The Wash around 8 miles North-Northeast of Holbeach. Becoming well established and expanded, RAF Practice Camp Sutton Bridge was renamed to No. 3 Armament Training Camp Sutton Bridge and later simply RAF Sutton Bridge. In October 1939 No. 266 Squadron RAF was reformed at RAF Sutton Bridge as a fighter squadron operating the Fairey Battle light bomber aircraft before taking delivery of the Supermarine Spitfire in January 1940, becoming the RAF's second Spitfire fighter Squadron after RAF Duxford’s No. 19 Squadron RAF.

On inception, training combat pilots of biplanes such as the Gloster Gamecock, Bristol F.2 Fighter, Armstrong Whitworth Atlas, Armstrong Whitworth Siskin, Bristol Bulldog and Fairey Flycatcher, Sutton Bridge later became accustomed to the intense activity of aircraft such as the Boulton Paul Defiant, Fairey Battle, Bristol Blenheim, Bristol Beaufort, Supermarine Spitfire, Hawker Hurricane, Airspeed Oxford, Miles M.19 Master II, P-51 Mustang, A-35 Vengeance, Lockheed Hudson, Vickers Wellington and Avro Lancaster bombers, to name a few, stationed at RAF Sutton Bridge over the course of its operational life. In 1937, the village of Sutton Bridge also attracted some 5000 people to its open day flying display on Empire Day, which included amongst its highlights, bombing a moving car and attacks on towed targets.

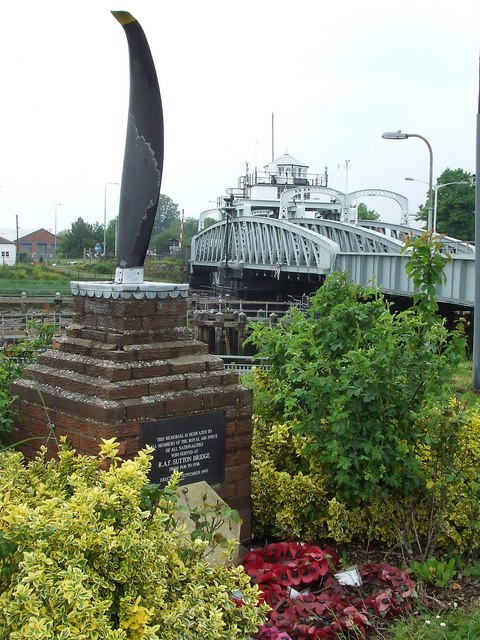
RAF Sutton Bridge memorial, at side of Cross Keys Bridge

RAF Sutton Bridge not only trained British combat pilots but also the RAF's commonwealth and foreign allied pilots, especially trainee Polish, Czech and French pilots. Many distinguished Second World War combat pilots passed through RAF Sutton Bridge training, such as Air Marshal Sir Richard Atcherley, Group Captain Billy Drake, Group Captain Sir Douglas Bader serving with No. 23 Squadron RAF and Dam Busters legend Wing Commander Guy Gibson. Along with RAF Sutton Bridge came also a stream of local crash landing incidents and mid-air collisions, many resulting in pilot fatalities. At the end of the Second World War, RAF Sutton Bridge was also used for dismantling aircraft such as the Vickers Wellington bomber, Avro Lancaster bomber and other British combat aircraft scheduled to be sold as scrap metal.

Today, small remnants of RAF Sutton Bridge airfield exist, in 1958 RAF Sutton Bridge was closed, its land site transferred to the Ministry of Agriculture and continues to be used by the Potato Marketing Board as one of the UK's leading agricultural experiment stations.

In 1947, a memorial in Saint Matthew's church was dedicated in memory of Commonwealth and Allied airmen who gave their lives whilst serving at RAF Sutton Bridge. The church also includes a Roll of Honour as well as a war grave cemetery. A memorial plinth-mounted propeller blade situated at the side of Cross Keys Bridge was also erected in 1993 in memory of all that served at RAF Sutton Bridge; the propeller blade came from a crashed Hawker Hurricane that was based at RAF Sutton Bridge. The marshland gunnery range itself, located along The Wash, survived as RAF Holbeach Bombing Range becoming parented to RAF Marham, it continues active service as a practice bombing range for the RAF as well as NATO-allied air forces.

=== Dam Busters Raid 1943 ===
During the early part of 1943 Sutton Bridge and Cross Keys Bridge was used by 617 Squadron from RAF Scampton to practise their low-level flying needed for Operation Chastise (the legendary Dam Busters raid). The mission was led by commanding officer Guy Gibson, who was familiar with the village of Sutton Bridge having participated in advanced training at RAF Sutton Bridge during the summer of 1937.

RAF Sergeant George (Johnny) Johnson DFM, Bomb-Aimer on board Lancaster bomber ED825/AJ-T commanded by Joe McCarthy that attacked the Sorpe Dam from a height of just 30 feet, recounts that in the village of Sutton Bridge there were electric cables that cross the River Nene just before the bridge itself and to hone their low-level flying skills they would regularly practice flying the Lancasters under the electric cables and skim up over Cross Keys Bridge, missing the bridge itself by only a few feet each time.

=== Sutton Bridge Prisoner of War (POW) Camp ===
Sutton Bridge POW Camp (designated POW Camp No. 254, Working Camp) was a relatively low-security prisoner of war confinement camp to a number of captured Wehrmacht soldiers, airmen, sailors and submariners from respectively the German Army, Luftwaffe (airforce) and Kriegsmarine (navy) during and after the Second World War. The Camp was located on the West Bank, next to what once was Travis & Arnold timber yard and offices, just off the road (left side) leading towards the old dock. Whilst in captivity the Sutton Bridge POWs were used by the Ministry of Agriculture and hired out to civilian contractors to perform local land labour work. Many German POWs throughout the UK were used as a labour force in agriculture and although interpreted as within the confines of Articles 27–32 of the Geneva Convention (1929), it caused debate in the UK; words such as "slave labour" was increasingly used in the media and in the House of Commons (see Treatment of POWs by the Western Allies).

The Sutton Bridge POW camp was designed to hold up to 250 POWs, consisting of wooden barracks and Nissen huts. Living conditions and facilities at the camp were sparse at best, with no electric lighting nor heating stoves until well after the War had ended. On 28 August 1948, an official inspection visit by the International Committee of the Red Cross reported prisoner conditions at Sutton Bridge POW Camp had improved significantly since their previous visit; 160 German Wehrmacht POWs were at that time interned in the camp quasi-hostel, electric lighting and coal heating stoves had found their way into the POW accommodation, each dormitory contained between 8 and 14 single beds, lockable lockers had just been delivered and doors had been fitted to toilet cubicles.

The interned POWs became a familiar part of Sutton Bridge community life while working the local farmland during their years of captivity and long after the war ended awaiting their repatriation (see Termination of captivity, unconditional surrender without armistice). On being formally discharged from captivity that finally occurred in late 1948 and early 1949, the few ex-POWs who remained in local employment sponsorship settled in the local community. Sutton Bridge continued to function as a boarding camp well into the early 1950s for some billeted ex-POWs who were either still awaiting repatriation or had elected to remain settled in local employment, until vacating to suitable local dwellings in and around Sutton Bridge. Remnants of Sutton Bridge POW camp site (location at: 52°46′15.80″N 0°11′45.82″E) and its buildings remained visible until the late 1970s–80s.

== Gallery ==
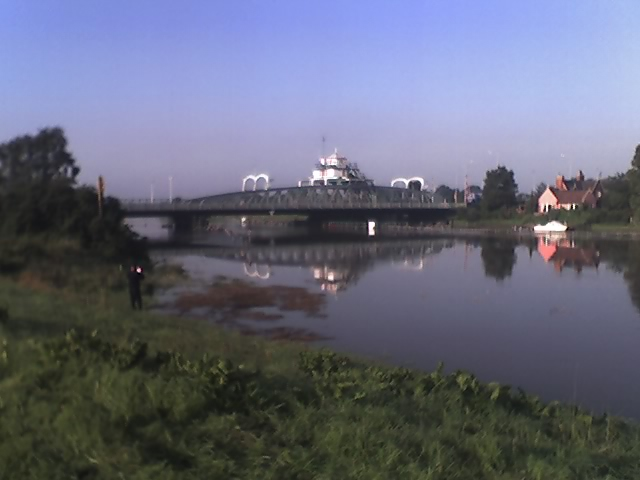
Cross Keys Bridge on a high spring tide

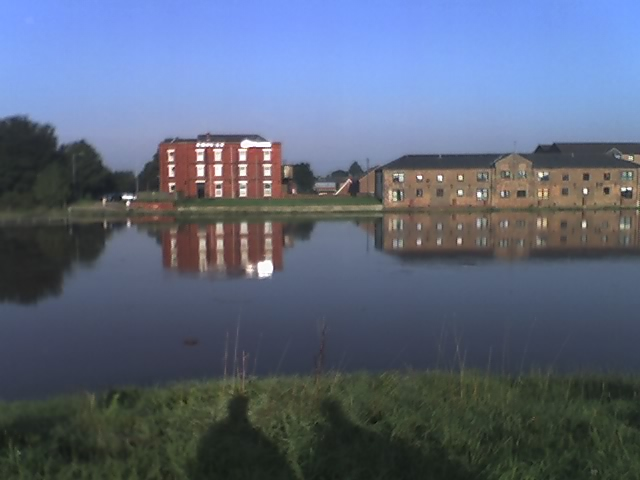
The River Nene and The Bridge Hotel

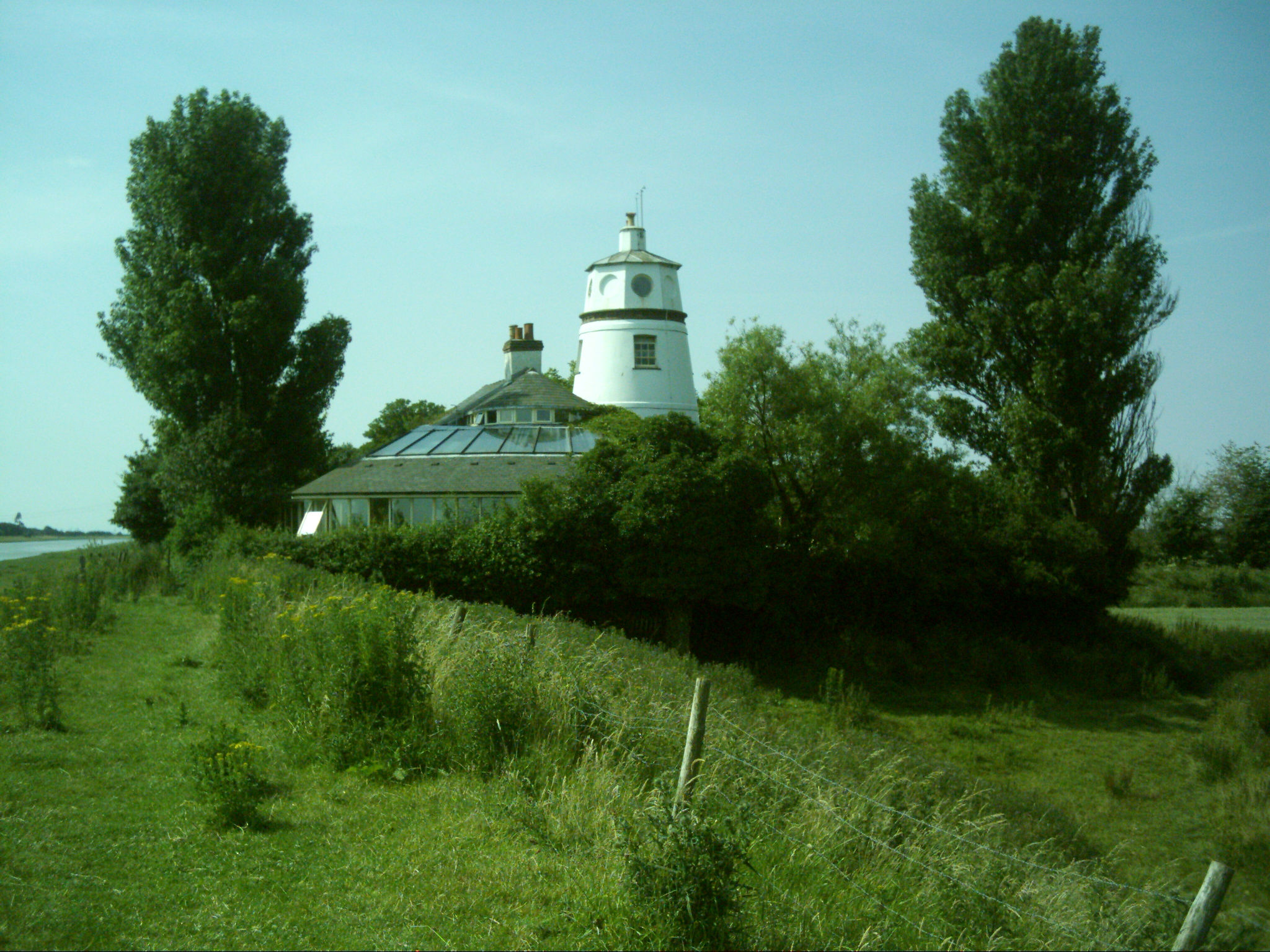
The lighthouse on the West bank of the river mouth

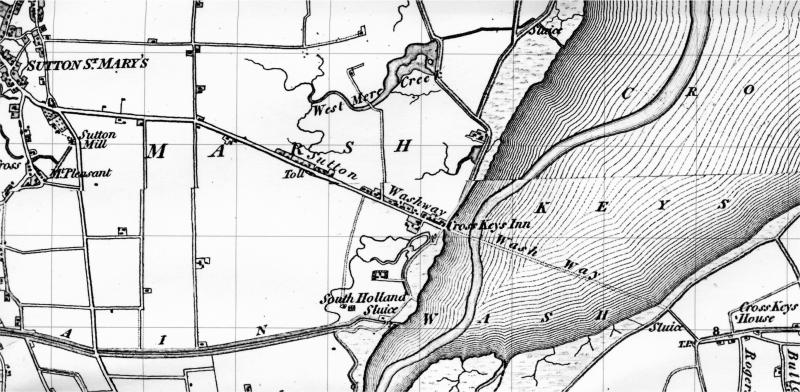
Ordnance Survey map of 1810: Cross Keys Inn is now within Sutton Bridge.

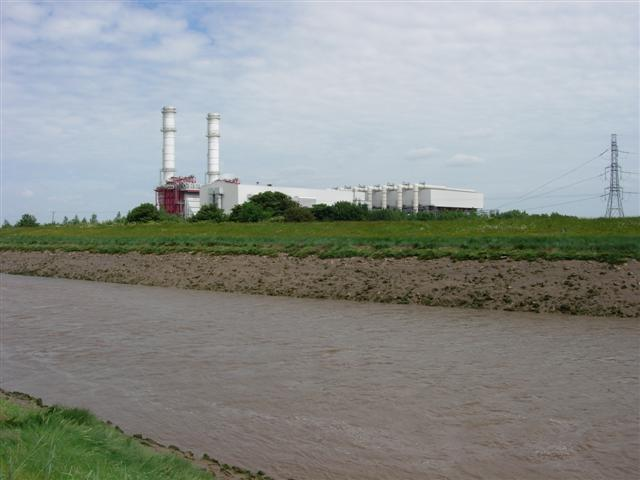
Sutton Bridge Power Station on the east side of the River Nene
