= Long Sutton Market House =

Commercial building in Long Sutton, Lincolnshire, England

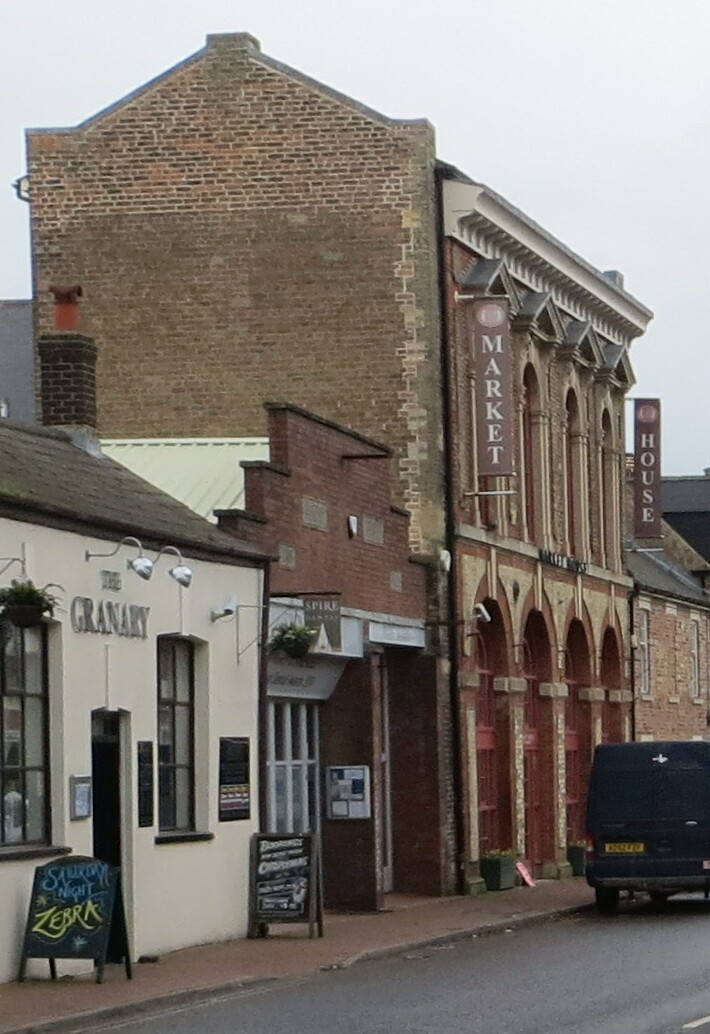
- Long Sutton Market House

- Shown in Lincolnshire
- 52.7859°N 0.1209°E
- Location: Market Street, Long Sutton

History
- Built: 1856

Site notes
- Architect: Bellamy and Hardy
- Architectural style: Italianate style

Long Sutton Market House, also known as Long Sutton Market House and Corn Exchange, is a commercial building in Market Street in Long Sutton, Lincolnshire, England. The structure, which is now used as a community events venue, is a locally listed building.

== History ==
In the first half of the 19th century, markets were held in the open air at the junction of the Market Place and the High Street. After finding this arrangement unsatisfactory, in the early 1850s, a group of local businessmen decided to form a private company, known as the "Long Sutton Market House Company", to finance and commission a purpose-built corn exchange and a public room for the town. The site they selected was undeveloped land on the southwest side of Market Street.

The building was designed by Bellamy and Hardy in the Italianate style, built in red brick with stone dressings at a cost of £1,000, and was completed in 1856. The design involved a symmetrical main frontage of four bays facing onto Market Street. The ground floor featured four round headed openings with red brick voussoirs and ashlar keystones. Decorative yellow bricks were applied on either side of the openings and in the spandrels above them. The first floor was fenestrated by four round headed windows with architraves and keystones flanked by short pilasters and brackets supporting pediments. At roof level, there was a heavily modillioned cornice. Internally, the principal rooms were a market hall on the ground floor and an assembly room on the first floor.

The market house also served as the local corn exchange and was the place for the receipt of local corn returns. However, the use of the building as a corn exchange declined significantly in the wake of the Great Depression of British Agriculture in the late 19th century.

After the First World War it became a vehicle workshop known as the "Exchange Garage" and later a stonemasons' workshop. In 1999 it was acquired by the South Holland District Council which supported an extensive programme of refurbishment works. The council let the building to a specially formed company, the Long Sutton Market House Trust, which undertook to manage the building for the benefit of the community. The building has subsequently served as a community events venue hosting film screenings, bingo nights and concerts.

== See also ==
- Corn exchanges in England
