= Sutton Bridge Power Station =

Gas-fired power station

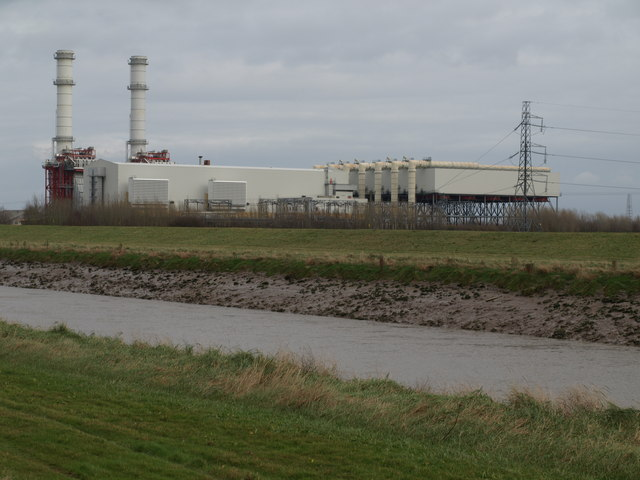
- Sutton Bridge power station
- Country: England
- Location: Lincolnshire, East Midlands
- Coordinates: 52.7572°N 0.19316°E
- Status: Mothballed
- Commission date: May 1999
- Decommission date: August 2020
- Operator: General Electric

Thermal power station
- Primary fuel: Natural gas

External links
- Commons: Related media on Commons

Sutton Bridge Power Station is an 819 MW gas-fired power station in Sutton Bridge in the south-east of Lincolnshire in South Holland, England. It is situated on Centenary Way close to the River Nene. It is a major landmark on the Lincolnshire and Norfolk border and on clear days with its bright red lights it can be easily seen as far away as Hunstanton.

== History ==
It was built by Enron at a cost of £337 million in May 1999 trading under the name of Sutton Bridge Power. It was constructed by Enron Engineering & Construction and designed by Stone & Webster with help from Atlantic Projects in building the steam turbine. In September 1999, it put the plant up for sale as the cost of electricity had plummeted, being uneconomic to generate. Enron already had another large CCGT power station on Teesside (which was the largest in Europe at that time).

In March 2000, the plant was bought by London Electricity, a division of EDF Energy for £156 million. The plant employs thirty five people and is run by General Electric International. The power plant has the capacity to supply 2% of the electricity for England and Wales.

Since September 2001, it has had a visitor centre for school children. When driving nearby to the north on the A17, the landmark is a dividing point between Lincolnshire and Norfolk.

EDF Energy announced in 2008 that it would sell Sutton Bridge to overcome objections to its takeover of British Energy. A consortium led by Macquarie Group purchased the site in 2012 for an undisclosed sum, and General Electric were appointed to operate and maintain the plant in 2013.

Macquarie later spunout the power plant owning part of the business as Calon Energy in 2015. In April 2018, Macquarie was reported to be considering selling Calon Energy, including the Sutton Bridge plant. However, it was still the owner at the time Calon Energy went into administration in June 2020.

In August 2020, it was reported that the plant was to be mothballed following Calon Energy entering administration. As of April 2022, the plant remained inactive, with "at least four months" worth of work reportedly required in order to bring it back to operational condition.

Sutton Bridge Power Station returned to service in December 2023.

== Specifications ==
The power station is a CCGT type, with two General Electric Frame 9 (9FA+) gas turbines powered with natural gas.

The exhaust gas heats a heat recovery steam generator, made by the Dutch company Standard Fasel Lentjes which was bought by NEM, which powers a GE 280 MW steam turbine. The electrical generators were also built by GE, which connect to the National Grid at 400 kV.
