= Kirkby la Thorpe =

Village and civil parish in North Kesteven district of Lincolnshire, England

Coordinates: 52.998718°N 0.364176°W

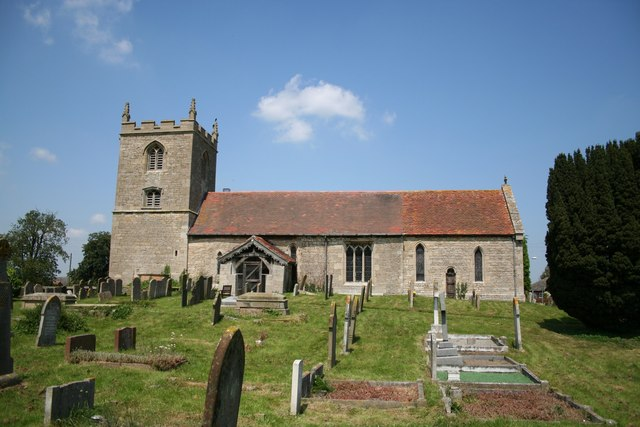
- Church of St Denys, Kirkby la Thorpe

- Location within Lincolnshire
- Population: 1,120 (2011)
- OS grid reference: TF098458
  - London: 105 mi (169 km) S
- District: North Kesteven
- Shire county: Lincolnshire
- Region: East Midlands
- Country: England
- Sovereign state: United Kingdom
- Post town: SLEAFORD
- Postcode district: NG34
- Police: Lincolnshire
- Fire: Lincolnshire
- Ambulance: East Midlands
- UK Parliament: Sleaford and North Hykeham

Kirkby la Thorpe is a village and civil parish in North Kesteven district of Lincolnshire, England.The population at the 2011 census was 1,120. It lies 1.5 miles (2.4 km) east from Sleaford. The village is near the start of the A17 Sleaford bypass.

== History ==
There are three possible deserted medieval village sites in the parish, identified as Thorpe, Laythorpe and Burgh – these from written records including Domesday. The identification of which site refers to which name is unlikely.

== Community ==
The civil parish extends to include that part of Sleaford that lies to the south-east of the town's Boston Road Police Station, including the Poets Estate. In the late 1990s Sleaford Town Council consulted residents over a proposed change in the civil parish boundary, in order to realign these parts within the town, but this was rejected. In 1924, Poets Estate fell within the ecclesiastical parish of New Sleaford, after the boundary between New Sleaford and the parish of Quarrington and Old Sleaford was altered from the River Slea to the railway line.

The village has a Church of England primary school, comprising the original 1860 building with its classroom and school hall. An extension housing three additional classrooms, cloakroom and library was opened in April 2004, and two further rooms were added in the summer of 2011.

The village public house is The Queens Head on Boston Road.

== Landmarks ==
Kirkby's Grade II* listed Anglican parish church is dedicated to St Denys. Originating in the 12th century, its chancel was rebuilt in 1854 in Early English style. The aisle and crenellated tower with crocketed pinnacles are of Decorated style, with the tower incorporating Saxon elements. There are remnants of 14th-century glass in the aisle windows. Kirkby previously contained two churches – the church of St Peter was pulled down in 1593, and in 1859 fragments of the church were found together with Saxon remains. St Denys' was part of the Leasingham Group of churches until the latter part of 2009, when the ecclesiastical parishes of Kirkby Laythorpe and Ewerby became part of the benefice of New Sleaford, to be held in plurality.

The Grange is a Grade II* listed house on Church Lane. Of 15th-century origin, it was altered in the 16th century – Pevsner records a moulded beam that indicates an earlier date. An early 19th-century barn on Church Lane, early 17th-century cottages on Mount Lane, and the mid-18th-century Mount Lane Farmhouse are also listed.
