= A17 road (England) =

Road in England

A17

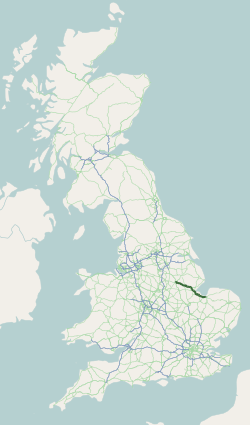

Route information
- Length: 59.4 mi (95.6 km)

Major junctions
- West end: A1 / A46 near Newark-on-Trent; 53.0946°N 0.7833°W
- A15 near Sleaford A52 near Swineshead; A16 in Sutterton A151 in Holbeach
- To: A47 near King's Lynn; 52.7426°N 0.3790°E

Location
- Country: United Kingdom
- Constituent country: England
- Counties: Nottinghamshire, Lincolnshire, Norfolk
- Primary destinations: Sleaford

Road network
- Roads in the United Kingdom; Motorways; A and B road zones
← A16	→ A18

The A17 road is a mostly single carriageway road linking Newark-on-Trent in Nottinghamshire, England, to King's Lynn in Norfolk. It stretches for a distance of 62 miles travelling across the flat fen landscapes of southern Lincolnshire and western Norfolk and links the East Midlands with East Anglia. The road is notable for its numerous roundabouts and notoriously dangerous staggered junctions and also for its most famous landmark, the Cross Keys Bridge at Sutton Bridge close to the Lincolnshire/Cambridgeshire/Norfolk borders which carries the road over the River Nene.

== Usage ==
The A17 is a major route for large goods vehicles (LGV) accessing Lincolnshire and Norfolk from northern England and the Midlands and is also a major holiday route particularly in the summer months for cars and caravans making their way from the north of England to East Anglian seaside resorts of Hunstanton, Wells-next-the-Sea, Sheringham, Cromer and Great Yarmouth as it is one of only two direct routes which link Norfolk with the A1, the other being the A47. The A17 has very few stretches of dual-carriageway (four in total) with the longest being the Sleaford bypass which is 3 miles (4.8 km) long with this section containing the only grade separated junctions on the route with the second-longest at Beckingham which is just 1/2 mile (0.80 km) long and the other two stretches are at roundabouts in Long Sutton and Sutton Bridge both of which are under 1/4 mile (0.40 km) long. In addition, there are several stretches of dual carriageway at junctions. It is one of two main routes for residents of East Anglia to get to the north of England (and vice versa). The other is the A47 via Peterborough, which is a longer route but has more dual carriageway, particularly around Peterborough, though it too remains mostly single carriageway.

The A17 was formerly a trunk road, but was reclassified as a principal road (maintained by the local authority) in 2002. The A47 retains trunk road status as far as its junction with the A1.

== History ==
The western end of the road formerly began at the former A46 junction in Newark-on-Trent where Queens Road met North Gate (former A46). It then followed Sleaford Road and Beacon Hill Road, meeting the A1 and passing through Coddington as Beckingham Road then Sleaford Lane. On the former section in Newark, when the Beacon Hill Bridge over the East Coast Main Line was replaced, the explosion to demolish the old bridge on 12 November 1961 put four construction workers in hospital.

== Route ==
=== Winthorpe to Sleaford ===
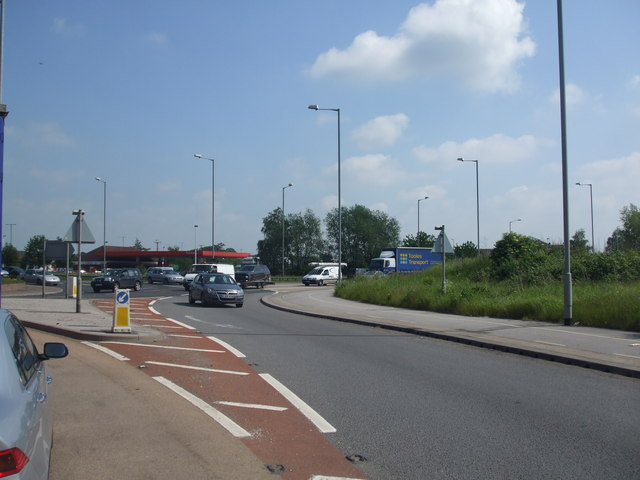
Western terminus of the A17 at the heavily congested Winthorpe roundabout

The western end begins in Winthorpe, Nottinghamshire, on the eastern side of the Newark bypass, where it meets the A46 at a roundabout, with access to the A1. This section passes over the former RAF Winthorpe (now Newark Air Museum, and there is a roundabout for Newlink Business Park. It meets the former route from Coddington at the Coddington Moor roundabout. It crosses the River Witham as part of the dual-carriageway Beckingham Bypass which was built in 1972 at a cost of £600,000.

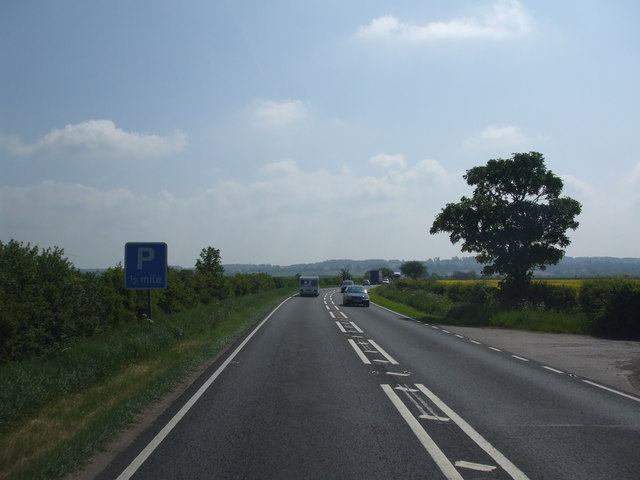
Approaching Leadenham from the west with the Lincoln Cliff in the distance

Leadenham is built on the side of the Lincoln Cliff, which the road no longer passes through, which gives access to the A607. In March 1995, the £3.3 million bypass was opened and the route passes through Leadenham Park to the south of the village.

At Cranwell and Byard's Leap, it re-enters North Kesteven at the line of the north–south Ermine Street (now the Viking Way). The road used to briefly follow Ermine Street southwards to Byard's Leap with its cafe, and then eastwards to the current route at the B1429 junction. The road now passes slightly further to the north, with a right turn for the B6403, and a left turn for the B1429 for RAF Cranwell. There is a crossroads for Cranwell, to the left, and North Rauceby, to the south.

=== Sleaford to Swineshead ===
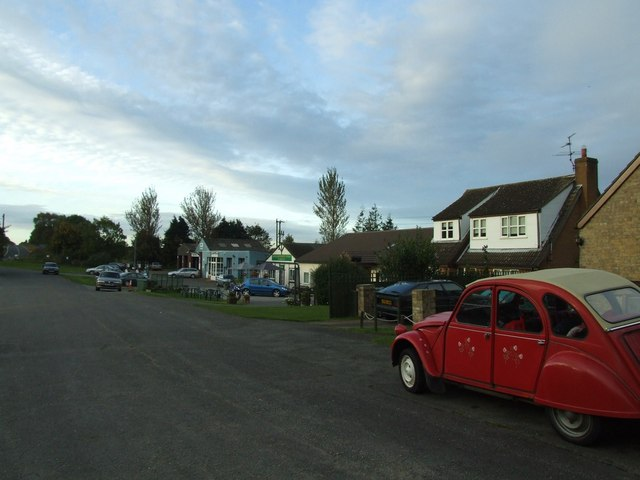
Byard's Leap cafe

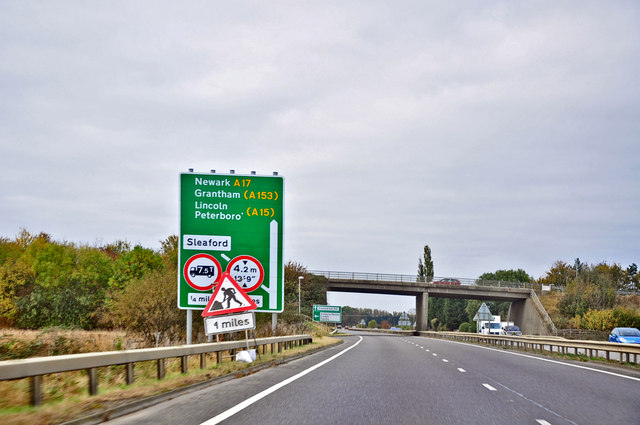
Kirkby la Thorpe end of the Sleaford bypass

The A17 meets the north–south A15 at the Holdingham Roundabout. Sleaford was bypassed by the A17 on 27 March 1975, when opened by Joseph Godber. The section from the A15 to the A153 had earlier been opened on 14 November 1973. It is the only substantial section of dual-carriageway on the route, and the main opportunity to overtake caravans and lorries. There is the grade-separated Bone Mill Junction with the A153, which shares the route from Holdingham, and the B1517 for Sleaford. It crosses the Peterborough to Lincoln Line, then the River Slea and the Spires and Steeples Trail. East of here to the road's eastern terminus, the landscape is flat. At Kirkby la Thorpe it meets the former route from Sleaford, near the Queens Head. The former route has a 13 ft 9in low (railway) Boston Road Bridge, another important reason for building the bypass. From here to Swineshead, the road follows the railway from Sleaford to Boston. There is a left turn for Asgarby, and a right turn for Burton Pedwardine.

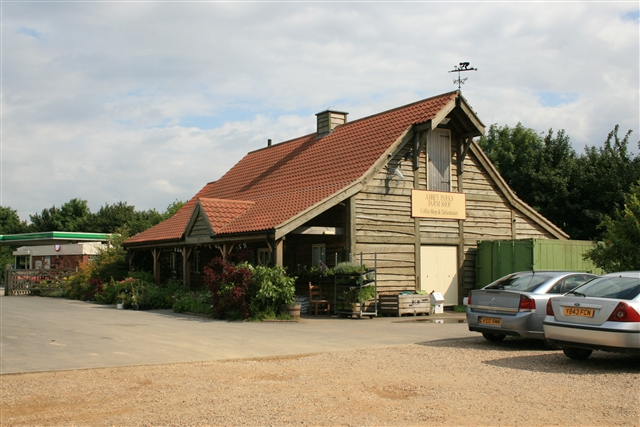
Abbey Parks farm shop in East Heckington

At Heckington, the £2.5 million 2.8-mile (4.5 km) bypass was opened on 14 December 1982 by Lynda Chalker, Baroness Chalker of Wallasey. The former route is the B1394, and meets the A17 east of the village at the point where it is crossed by a 400 kV pylon line. A mile east of Heckington, it crosses the Car Dyke. There is a left turn for the B1395, for South Kyme, and the road forms the parish boundary between Heckington and Great Hale until the district boundary. At the Holland Dike, it enters the borough of Boston (the former Kesteven/Holland boundary).

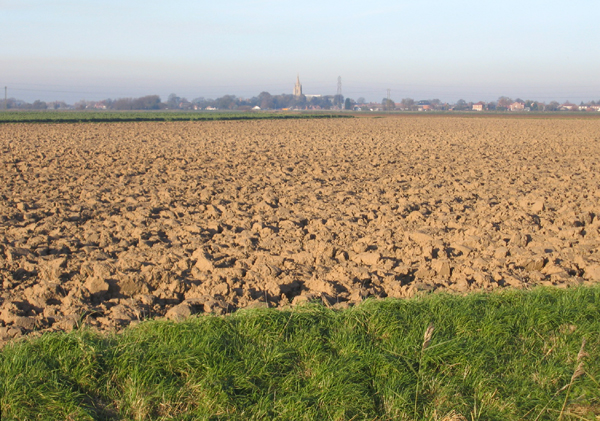
Bicker Bar

At Swineshead Bridge there is a left turn for the A1121, for Boston, and the road is crossed by the Poacher Line at a level crossing next to the Barge Inn and Swineshead railway station. Swineshead was bypassed in 1985, and the former route leaves at the High Bridge Junction, passing The Ivy farm shop, which is sister to the Manor Farm Shop.

=== Swineshead to Long Sutton ===
At Bicker, it meets the A52 at the Bicker Bar Roundabout, next to the Texaco Bicker Bar Service Station and Supreme Inns. The road meets its former route. At Bank House at Wigtoft, there is a right turn for the B1181, for Bicker. Wigtoft itself is bypassed, to the south, by the £4.4 million 3-mile (4.8 km) Wigtoft-Sutterton Bypass, which opened in July 1995. At Sutterton, on the bypass, it meets the B1397 Spalding Road at staggered crossroads, for Gosberton, and Sutterton, which is the former A16 (Spalding to Boston). At Sutterton Roundabout, near Algarkirk, it meets the A16.

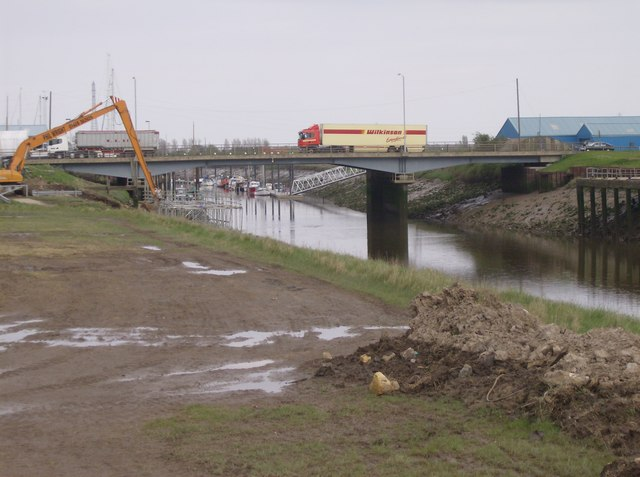
Fosdyke Bridge

It passes Fosdyke to the west, where it crosses the River Welland at Fosdyke Bridge, entering the district of South Holland a few hundred yards south of the bridge near the Ship Inn. This was built as a swing bridge in 1911 but replaced in 1989 with the current fixed span. The loss of swing stranded the coaster, JonSue, on the landward side. In March 1991 the ship was holed and sank when, on a falling tide, she settled on a dislodged limestone boulder used to reinforce the Welland channel and was cut up on site later the same year. The Macmillan Way crosses the river via this bridge also. At Moulton, there is a right turn for the B1357 for Moulton Seas End. At Whaplode as Washway Road, it passes Saracen's Head. At this point the former road passed through Saracen's Head, Holbeach and Fleet Hargate. The bypass, New Washway Road from Saracen's Head to Laurel Lodge Farm, opened in 1989. It meets the A151 on a newly built £5.4 million roundabout which opened in December 2017, and there is also a roundabout for the B1168 (the former route through Holbeach). At Fleet it passes a Hawker Hunter installed near the road, and meets the B1515, the former route from Holbeach, west of Fleet Hargate. At Gedney it meets the former route, with St Mary Magdalene Church, Gedney seen to the south.

=== Long Sutton to King's Lynn ===
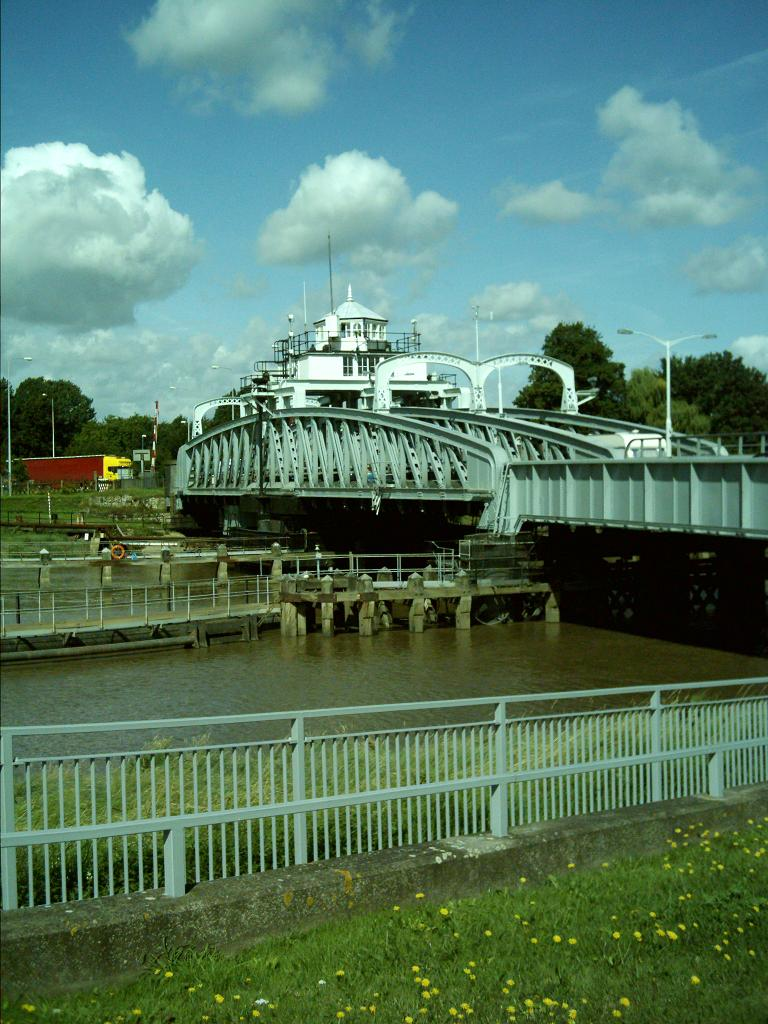
Cross Keys Bridge

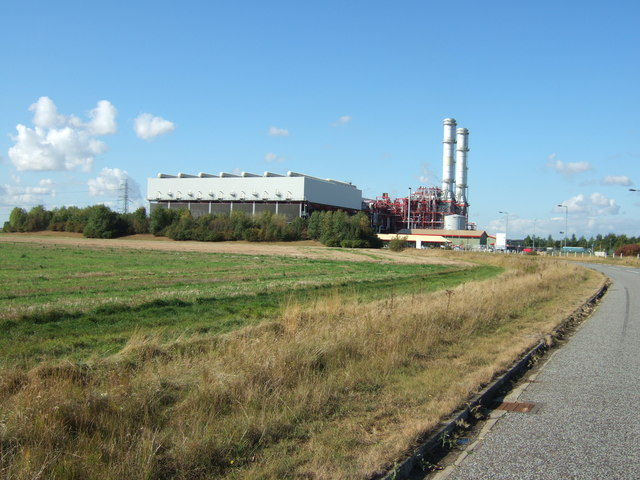
Sutton Bridge Power Station

The A17 meets the B1359 (for Gedney Drove End) at a roundabout. The Long Sutton-Sutton Bridge bypass was opened in 1989. It passes Long Sutton, Little Sutton and Sutton Bridge. It meets the B1390, for Sutton St James, at a roundabout. It meets the B1359 (for Long Sutton), and the A1101, for Wisbech, at a roundabout. There are two roundabouts where it changes direction abruptly and crosses the Cross Keys swing bridge over the River Nene at Sutton Bridge. This bridge retains its swing function necessary for access to Wisbech port for pleasure craft and small coasters. It was constructed as a shared road/rail bridge with the single line rail crossing on the west side. With the closure of the line the A17 was increased to two lanes but this bridge remains a congestion point to this day. To the south is the Sutton Bridge Power Station which is a major landmark along the route and following the river North for half a mile is the port of Sutton Bridge. Just east of the bridge the turning to the left provides access to the "Sir Peter Scott Walk" coastal path and "Snowgoose Trust" bird sanctuary.

The road follows an embankment close to the edge of The Wash, and at Walpole Cross Keys it enters Norfolk and the district of King's Lynn and West Norfolk. The £3.14 million 6.8-mile (10.9 km) West of Kings Lynn – County Boundary section was opened on 14 December 1982 by Lynda Chalker, Baroness Chalker of Wallasey. In Terrington St Clement, there is a crossroads at Balsam Field, for Tilney High End to the right. From this point all the way to the A47 junction, the road is the parish boundary between Clenchwarton to the north, and Tilney All Saints to the south. The former route passed through Terrington St Clement, Clenchwarton and West Lynn. The improved follows the former Spalding to South Lynn, part of the Midland and Great Northern Joint Railway (M&GN), which closed on 2 March 1959. Whilst the A17 has a chequered accident record, not a single passenger was killed on this former railway. It meets the A47 at the start of the King's Lynn bypass at what's known as the "Pullover Roundabout".

== Junction list ==
=== A17 ===
County	Location	mi	km	Destinations	Notes
Nottinghamshire	Winthorpe	0.0	0.0	A1 / A46 to A57 / A1133 – Grantham, Doncaster, Newark, Lincoln, Sheffield, Gainsborough	Western terminus
Lincolnshire	Sleaford	16.6	26.7	A15 / B1518 (Lincoln Road) to A153 – Peterborough, Lincoln, Sleaford, Grantham	
Lincolnshire	Sleaford	17.8– 18.1	28.6– 29.1	A153 north-east – Sleaford, Horncastle, Skegness, Ruskington, Anwick	Skegness signed eastbound only; grade-separated junction
Lincolnshire	Kirkby la Thorpe	19.6	31.5	Kirkby la Thorpe, Evedon, Ewerby, Sleaford	Grade-separated junction
Lincolnshire	Swinshead	27.6	44.4	A1121 east – Boston	Western terminus of A1121
Lincolnshire	Bicker	30.6	49.2	A52 (Donington Road) – Grantham, Boston, Bicker, Donington, Swineshead, Kirton Holme, Wyberton	
Lincolnshire	Sutterton	35.1	56.5	A16 / Station Road – Spalding, Boston, Sutterton, Surfleet, Kirton, Peterborough	Peterborough signed westbound only
Lincolnshire	Holbeach	42.0	67.6	A151 west – Spalding, Whaplode, Moulton	Eastern terminus of A151
Lincolnshire	Long Sutton	48.6	78.2	A1101 south / B1359 (Wisbech Road) – Wisbech, Long Sutton	Northern terminus of A1101
Lincolnshire	Sutton Bridge	51.3	82.6	Cross Keys Bridge over River Nene	
Norfolk		59.4	95.6	A47 / Clenchwarton Road to A10 / A149 – Wisbech, King's Lynn, Swaffham, West Lynn, Downham Market, Cromer, Clenchwarton, Fakenham, Hunstanton, Sandringham	Eastern terminus
1.000 mi = 1.609 km; 1.000 km = 0.621 mi
