= Standard Occupational Classification (United Kingdom) =

Occupational classification system for statistical purposes

The Standard Occupational Classification, often abbreviated as the SOC, is the system used by the United Kingdom's Office for National Statistics (ONS) to classify people for statistical purposes according to their job. Under this system, a job is defined as "a set of tasks or duties to be carried out by one person". The SOC classifies jobs according to the level and specialisation of skill. The SOC was introduced in 1990. It has undergone several revisions; the latest, SOC 2020, includes nine major groups of occupations, each broken down into smaller units: there are 26 sub-major groups, 104 minor groups and 412 unit groups. The groups are designed to be as similar as possible to the International Standard Classification of Occupations 2008.

== Major groups ==
=== Managers, directors and senior officials ===
These are defined by the ONS as "occupations whose tasks consist of planning, directing and coordinating resources to achieve the efficient functioning of organisations and businesses". Most of these jobs require a large amount of experience and knowledge about the way businesses function.

The 2010 version of the SOC codes these occupations under Major Group 1. This is divided into Sub-Major Group 11 (corporate managers) and Sub-Major Group 12 (other managers and proprietors). The former includes chief executives, senior officials (including elected officials), production, functional and financial managers, as well as managers in transport, logistics, health and social services and retail and wholesale services; it also includes senior officials in protective services (including the armed forces and emergency services). Sub-Major Group 12 includes managers and proprietors in agriculture, hospitality and leisure, health and care, and other services.

There are often no specific qualifications required for roles and most jobs are filled through appointment or promotion based on experience, though some may require academic or professional qualifications (such as jobs in financial or engineering management); some appointments are made through management trainee schemes which will have minimum academic requirements. On-the-job training is provided for some roles and professional qualifications are available for many of them. In the armed forces and emergency services, appointment to senior posts may require a medical examination and there are age-based restrictions for promotion.

=== Professional occupations ===
Coded as Major Group 2 in the 2010 SOC, professional occupations are those "whose main tasks require a high level of knowledge and experience in the natural sciences, engineering, life sciences, social sciences, humanities and related fields." Most of the work involves applying a large amount of theoretical knowledge to practical tasks, conducting research to widen that knowledge, or disseminating that knowledge (for instance, by teaching).

Under the 2010 version, the ONS breaks this group down into science, research, and engineering professionals (sub-group 21, including IT, telecoms and conservation and environment professionals); health professionals (sub-group 22, including therapists, nurses and midwives); teaching and educational professionals (sub-group 23); and business, media and public services professionals (sub-group 24, including legal professionals, architects, town planners, librarians, welfare professionals and quality and regulatory professionals).

Most of these professions will require a university degree or equivalent; some require postgraduate education and may also include a formal period of training.

=== Associate professional and technical occupations ===
Under the 2010 SOC scheme, these occupations "require experience and knowledge of principles and practices necessary to assume operational responsibility and to give technical support to Professionals and to Managers, Directors and Senior Officials". They are coded under Major Group 3 and divided into five sub-major groups:

- Science, engineering and technology associate professionals (sub-group 31), which include science, engineering and production technicians, draughtspersons, architectural technicians and IT technicians.
- Health and social care associate professionals (sub-group 32), including paramedics, opticians, pharmaceutical technicians, medical and dental technicians, youth and community workers, housing officers and counsellors.
- Protective service occupations (sub-group 33). These include non-commissioned officers in the armed forces and low-ranking officers in the emergency services.
- Culture, media and sports occupations (sub-group 34). These include artistic, literary, media, design, sports and fitness occupations.
- Business and public service associate professionals (sub-group 35), including those working in transport, the law, business, finance, sales, marketing, conservation, environment and public services.

=== Administrative occupations ===
These are workers who carry out administrative, clerical and secretarial duties. They are coded under Major-Group 4, which is sub-divided into two groups: administrative occupations (sub-group 41), which includes administrators in government, finance and records as well as office managers and supervisors; and secretarial occupations (sub-group 42). Most jobs require a level of educational attainment and some may entail training or require professional qualifications.

=== Skilled trades occupations ===
Coded under Major-Group 5 in the 2010 SOC, these jobs "involve the performance of complex physical duties that normally require a degree of initiative, manual dexterity and other practical skills". Skilled trades require a large period of training and involve a high level of skill. The occupations are classified into four sub-groups:

- 51: skilled agricultural and related trades, including farmers, horticulturists, gardeners and groundskeepers.
- 52: skilled metal, electrical and electronic trades, including people involved in the working and forming metal; machining and fitting metal; and working on vehicles.
- 53: skilled construction and building trades, including supervisors
- 54: textiles, printing and other skilled trades. These also include skilled trades in food preparation and hospitality.

=== Caring, leisure and other service occupations ===
These are jobs which involve providing services to customers. This includes caring for people and animals and providing travel and hygiene services. The 2010 SOC breaks these jobs down into two sub-groups within Major Group 6: caring personal services (sub-group 61); and leisure, travel and related personal services (sub-group 62), which include hairdressers, housekeepers and cleaning managers. The 2020 revision added another sub-group, number 63, for community and civil enforcement occupations. Workers have to have a good education and vocational training; some of these jobs require professional qualifications and/or registration with professional organisations.

=== Sales and customer service occupations ===
Under the 2010 SOC scheme, the ONS defines these jobs as those whose "tasks require the knowledge and experience necessary to sell goods and services, accept payment in respect of sales, replenish stocks of goods in stores, provide information to potential clients and additional services to customers after the point of sale". These include sales assistants, retail cashiers and sales supervisors, all classified under sub-group 71; and customer service occupations, managers and supervisors, in sub-group 72. Appointments usually require a good education and communication skills; some may require specific knowledge about a good or service which is related to their sales work.

=== Process, plant and machine operatives ===
Occupations in this category involve operating and monitoring industrial machinery, assembling products under strict rules, and driving and helping to operate transport vehicles or other machines. Classified under Major Group 8, they are divided into sub-groups 81 (process, plant and machine operatives) an 82 (transport and mobile machine operatives). Most jobs entail or require formal training and some will require that workers be licensed to carry out their work.

=== Elementary occupations ===
These are jobs which involve "mostly routine tasks, often involving the use of simple hand-held tools and, in some cases, requiring a degree of physical effort". They usually do not require educational qualifications, but will often involve short formal training.

In the 2010 version of the SOC, these occupations are coded under Major Group 9, which is divided into Sub-Major Group 91 (elementary trades and related occupations) and Sub-Major Group 92 (elementary administration and service occupations). Group 91 includes farm labourers, forestry or fishing workers, general construction labourers, packers, bottlers and labellers, industrial cleaners and other elementary process or plant workers. Group 92 includes occupations involving routine clerical, cleaning, security, sales, storage or transportation tasks, as well as postal workers, couriers, sorters and hospital porters.
