= Long Sutton, Lincolnshire =

Market town in Lincolnshire, England

Coordinates: 52.78564°N 0.12001°E

Long Sutton
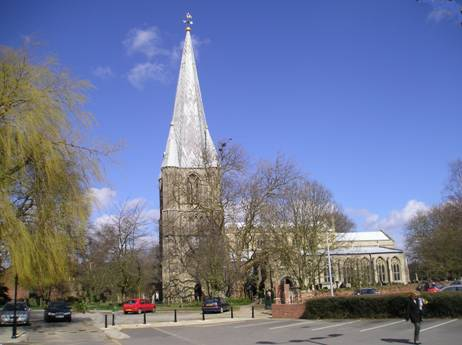
- St Mary's Church

- Location within Lincolnshire
- Population: 4,821 (2011)
- OS grid reference: TF430230
  - London: 90 mi (140 km) SSW
- Civil parish: Long Sutton
- District: South Holland
- Shire county: Lincolnshire
- Region: East Midlands
- Country: England
- Sovereign state: United Kingdom
- Post town: SPALDING
- Postcode district: PE12
- Dialling code: 01406
- Police: Lincolnshire
- Fire: Lincolnshire
- Ambulance: East Midlands
- UK Parliament: South Holland and The Deepings

Long Sutton is a market town and civil parish in the South Holland district of Lincolnshire, England. It lies in The Fens, close to the Wash, 13 miles (21 km) east of Spalding. In 2011 the parish had a population of 4,821.

== History ==
The name Sutton derives from the Old English sūðtūn meaning 'south settlement'. Long was a later addition added to distinguish it from other places named Sutton.

Long Sutton belonged historically to the wapentake of Elloe in the Parts of Holland.

A flood in 1236 that destroyed Wisbech Castle is also said to have washed away the village of Dolproon (or Dolprun) near Long Sutton and its existence has been handed down in the lines: "When Dolproon stood, Long Sutton was a wood. When Dolproon was washed down, Long Sutton became a town."

By the mid-14th century, it was considered to be one of the richest communities in Lincolnshire.

In the 1800s the town was on the circuits of touring theatre companies, in 1842 the Bullen theatre company performed here. Long Sutton Market House was completed in 1856.

Long Sutton railway station on the Midland and Great Northern Joint Railway opened in July 1862 and closed in 1959 when passenger services were withdrawn.

In 1987 a Butterfly Park was opened near Long Sutton. The park was closed in October 2012 after a series of losses and bad weather.

On 21 June 2012, at about 2:30 pm, a tornado hit Long Sutton. Particular damage was caused in Woad Lane with the tornado "leaving a trail of destruction in its wake".

== Governance ==
An electoral ward in the same name exists. This stretches south to Tydd St Mary, with a total population at the 2011 Census of 7,260.

== Community ==
Long Sutton is the terminus of the A1101. It is now bypassed, with Sutton Bridge, by the A17 which follows the former railway. In 2001 the town had a population of 6,461.

Long Sutton is served by one main local newspaper company, Spalding Today, which produces the Spalding Guardian and the Lincolnshire Free Press.

=== Food canning factory ===
Since the 1940s, one of the largest local employers was the factory of Eastern Counties Preserves Ltd (ECP). Known for their ‘Peasant Boy’ brand, they were manufacturers of canned goods and jams, with another canning factory in Forfar, Angus, Scotland, and an office in Eastcheap, London. The company was owned by Philip B. Lockwood and later became known from 1959 as Lockwoods Foods Ltd. Their principal factory was situated on Bridge Road, nestled between Sutton Bridge and Long Sutton. It produced a range of Lockwoods own-brand canned vegetables, fruits and carbonated beverages, ranging from mushy peas to seasonal strawberries to a variety of canned beverages including cola ginger beer, and lemonade shandy. The firm catered to UK and overseas markets, including third-party brands such as Del Monte. In the 1980s the factory was acquired by Premier Foods, as Lockwoods Foods Limited went into administrative receivership. Premier Foods, among other food brands, later produced the staple Fray Bentos canned steak and kidney pie at the Long Sutton factory. After the sale of Fray Bentos to Baxters in 2011, production moved to Scotland in 2013. Since 2011, the factory now belongs to the Princes Food & Drink Group. Long Sutton is its largest food production site in the United Kingdom.

=== Facilities and landmarks ===
Long Sutton County Primary School is in Dick Turpin Way in the centre of Long Sutton. It has about 400 pupils. University Academy Long Sutton is the local co-educational secondary modern school.

St Mary's Church has a 13th-century lead-covered timber spire similar in design to Chesterfield Parish Church's twisted spire, but Long Sutton's is straight. The church is a Grade I listed building. The spire is 149 feet (45 metres) high.

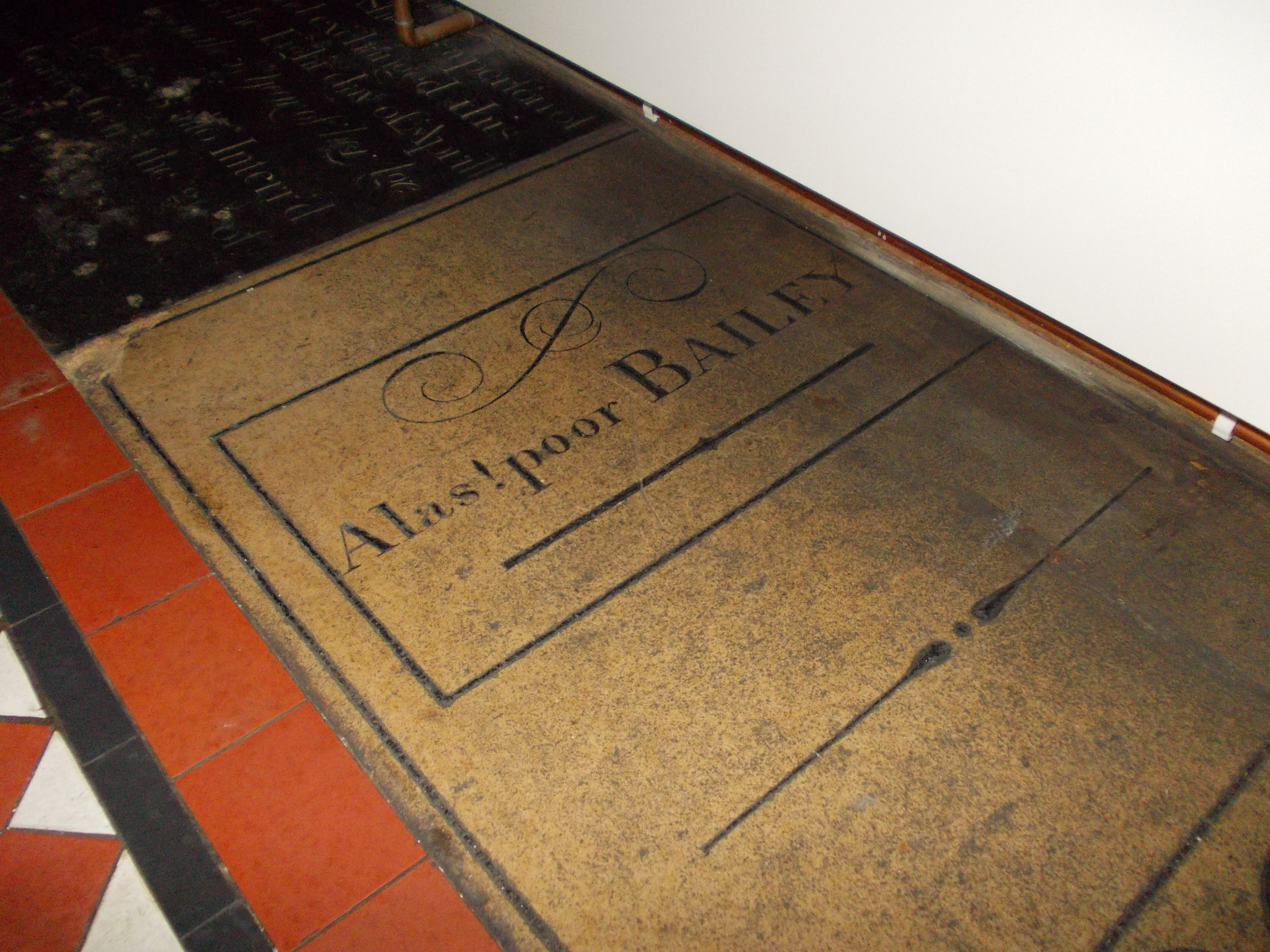
Dr Bailey's inscribed stone in the church

Within the church is a memorial inscribed "Alas! Poor Bailey" to a local surgeon, John Bailey, who was killed by robbers while returning from a visit to a patient in Tydd St Mary just after midnight on 22 April 1795. His murderers were not caught.

Town public houses are the Olde Ship Inn in London Road, the Crown and Woolpack in High Street, and the Corn Exchange and the Granary in Market Street.

=== Sport ===
The town's Long Sutton Athletic F.C. plays in the Peterborough and District Football League. It previously played in the Eastern Counties Football League.

== Media ==
Local news and television programmes are provided by BBC Yorkshire and Lincolnshire and ITV Yorkshire. Television signals are received from the Belmont TV transmitter, BBC East Midlands and ITV Central can also be received from the Waltham TV transmitter.

The town is covered by both BBC Radio Lincolnshire and BBC Radio Cambridgeshire. The area is one of the few in Lincolnshire to be covered by a local DAB multiplex, NOW Peterborough.

Local newspapers are Spalding Today and Spalding Voice.

== Notable people ==
In birth order:

- Christopher Helme (1603 – c. 1650), born in Long Sutton, was an emigrant to Massachusetts Bay Colony and a founder of Exeter, New Hampshire.
- Dick Turpin (1705–1739), highwayman, lived in Long Sutton for about nine months as John Palmer (or Parmen). There is a road in the town named after him.
- Alfred Fletcher (1841–1915), journalist and left-wing politician, was born in Long Sutton.
- Richard Winfrey (1858–1944) was a Liberal MP, newspaper publisher and campaigner for agricultural rights. His family donated Winfrey Park.
- Henry Harold Welch Pearson (1870–1916) was a Long Sutton-born South African botanist. The African genus Pearsonia was named after him.
- Reginald Skelton (1872–1958), born in Long Sutton, was a naval vice-admiral and polar explorer. He was knighted in 1931.
- Alfred Haines (1877–1935) from Long Sutton became a first-class cricketer playing for Gloucestershire.
- Alfred Piccaver (1884–1958), operatic tenor, was born in Long Sutton.
