= A1101 road =

Road in England

A1101

Route information
- Length: 53 mi (85 km)

Location
- Country: United Kingdom

Road network
- Roads in the United Kingdom; Motorways; A and B road zones

The A1101 is the lowest road in Great Britain; for the whole length of the road, it rarely rises above sea level. It is also the longest 4 digit A road in Great Britain at 53.5 miles (86 km).

== Route ==
The road runs from Bury St Edmunds north west to Littleport where it disappears for approximately 2 miles (3.2 km), it then re-appears on the other side of the A10 heading north through Wisbech and to its end at the A17 in Long Sutton. The A1101's route takes it across the Fens in Lincolnshire and Norfolk, a low-lying area to Suffolk through Cambridgeshire. It is the main road for access between Lincolnshire and the Fenlands and the only road to directly link Suffolk with Lincolnshire. The stretch between Wisbech and Long Sutton was previously designated the A150.

From Outwell north, where the western terminus of the A1122 is at, the road is classified as a primary route. At Welney, the road often floods, causing it to be closed for 70 days in 2007. The Environment Agency said that "The A1101 road is on a causeway across the flood area and was expected to be under water at times." When the road across the Ouse Washes is closed by flooding, it is a 22-mile detour.

== Major junctions ==
It crosses the following major roads (from N to S):

- A17 – Newark-on-Trent to King's Lynn
- A47 – Great Yarmouth to Birmingham (partially reclassified as the B4114)
- A10 (Great Cambridge Road) – London Bridge to King's Lynn
- A11 – London to Norwich
- A14 – Port of Felixstowe to the M1 junction with the M6 (19) north-east of Rugby.

== Road safety ==
The A1101 has a poor road safety record as reported by EuroRAP. In 2006, the road was featured in the AA Motoring Trust/EuroRAP list of Most Dangerous Roads in Britain (excluding motorcycle accidents). The 21 km stretch of single-carriageway road between Outwell (A1122) – Long Sutton (A17) suffered 24 fatal and serious injury accidents between 2002 and 2004. This stretch of the road is currently rated as being of medium-high risk.
