= Ruskington =

Village in Lincolnshire, England

Coordinates: 53.0444°N 0.3875°W

- Civil parish
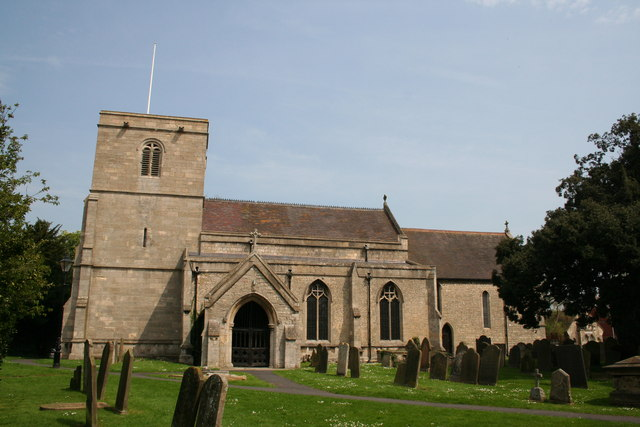
- All Saints' Church

- Location within Lincolnshire
- Interactive map of Ruskington
- Area: 6.17 sq mi (16.0 km^{2})
- Population: 5,648 (2021)
  - Density: 915/sq mi (353/km^{2})
- OS grid reference: TF082508
  - London: 105 mi (169 km) S
- District: North Kesteven
- Shire county: Lincolnshire
- Region: East Midlands
- Country: England
- Sovereign state: United Kingdom
- Post town: SLEAFORD
- Postcode district: NG34
- Dialling code: 01526
- Police: Lincolnshire
- Fire: Lincolnshire
- Ambulance: East Midlands
- UK Parliament: Sleaford and North Hykeham

Ruskington is a village and civil parish in the North Kesteven district of Lincolnshire, England, located approximately 4 miles (6.4 km) north of Sleaford on the north–south B1188 road and slightly north of the A153 road. The village contains approximately 2,600 dwellings and is approximately 1 mile (1.6 km) in length, measured from east to west. The population of the civil parish was 5,169 at the 2001 census, increasing to 5,637 at the 2011 census and 5,648 at the 2021 census.

== Geography ==
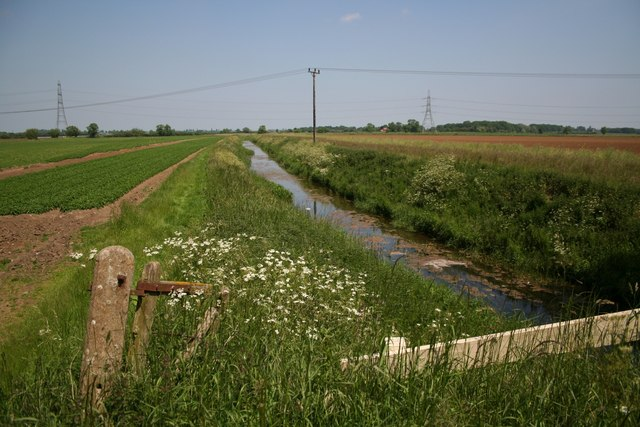
River Slea south of the village near the A153

Ruskington is approximately 4 miles (6.4 km) to the north of Sleaford, 20 miles (32 km) from Newark and Grantham, and 15 miles (24 km) from Boston and Lincoln, with a flat landscape. The Spires and Steeples Trail passes north–south through the village, following the River Slea into Sleaford. The High Street is split into two parts, High Street North and High Street South, by The Beck, a brook that flows from Bloxholm 5 miles (8 km) west of the village before merging into the Slea at Haverholme Park. A large number of Mallard ducks inhabit the Beck and surrounding gardens.

Roxholm is to the west of the civil parish, and the boundary passes south of Roxholm Grange. On the road to Dunsby it meets Brauncewell, passes eastward through Cottage Farm, crossing the road to Bloxholm, then crossing the B1188, Lincoln Road, 0.5 miles (0.8 km) north of the village, where it meets Dorrington, skirting the northern edge of the village.

The border crosses the railway south of Cedar Farm (in Dorrington), then follows to the south of the road from Dorrington out onto the fens (Ruskington Fen). At Sylcote, it meets North Kyme, following Farroway Drain to the south at Ruskington Dales. It then follows Anwick Bank westward, where it meets Anwick to the south. At Highfield, it follows the Anwick road to the south, crossing the A153. North of Haverholme Priory (outside the parish), meeting Ewerby and Evedon at the River Slea, which it follows for over 300 yards (270 m) to the west, before meeting Leasingham. It follows the northern edge of the wood westward along a tributary of the River Slea, then follows parallel to the A153 westward to the south. It crosses the A153 south of the 400 kV pylons, before meeting Roxholm at a copse north of Rigg Farm.

== History ==
=== Etymology ===
Ruskington is first attested in the Domesday Book of 1086, where it appears as Rischintone and Reschintone. This means "town or settlement where rushes grow", from the Old English *ryscen (with Scandinavian -sk-) + tūn.

=== Early history ===
The remains of a Roman road also run parallel and to the west of Lincoln Road, but are apparent only in aerial photographs. Ruskington's Anglo-Saxon burial ground is situated on Lincoln Road near Mill House. At the time of the Domesday Book of 1086, it was part of the ancient Flaxwell "wapentake" (a collection of local parishes).

== Local governance and public services ==
Ruskington is served by the Ruskington Parish Council, which is composed of thirteen councillors and meets at the Winchelsea Centre on the second Tuesday of each month, except in August. Meetings are open to the public, with a brief public forum held prior to the formal session. The Council is responsible for local services including community buildings, play areas, sport fields, allotments and burial grounds, and operates as the first tier of local government in liaison with North Kesteven District Council.

Policing in Sleaford falls under the responsibility of the Lincolnshire Police, and fire-fighting under the responsibility of the Lincolnshire Fire and Rescue Service.

The medical centre is in Brookside Close. There is a dental surgery on High Street North, and an optician on High Street South. Brookside Close has a veterinary surgery, with another vet's surgery on High Street North. East Midlands Ambulance Service (EMAS) operates a station on Kesteven Street, Sleaford. The United Lincolnshire Hospitals NHS Trust provides services at three main hospitals in the county, Pilgrim Hospital (Boston), Grantham and District Hospital, and Lincoln County Hospital, all of which run 24-hour accident and emergency departments as of January 2015.

== Economy ==
The main employer in Ruskington is the Pilgrims Pride factory on the Sleaford Road. Pilgrims acquired the former owners Tulip, a division of Danish Crown (previously "George Adams"), in August 2019.

The factory is a pork and chicken products factory which originally produced primarily sausages and pork pies. Pilgrims's Ruskington site now produces fried crumbed products like Scotch eggs, mini eggs, chicken straws and cocktail sausages. It was the manufacturer of Spam fritters and Wicked Pigs, but these products have been discontinued. Stores and local shops provide other employment.

== Transport ==
The B1188 road runs through the village, terminating 1 mile (1.6 km) south of the village, at Speedway Corner. A railway station, which originally opened on 1 August 1882, and reopened on 5 May 1975, is on the Peterborough to Lincoln Line. Passenger trains do not run on Sundays. Ruskington is on a bus route between Sleaford and Lincoln, and a local bus operating company, Phillips of Ruskington, operates the local school buses.

== Education ==
=== Primary schools ===
Ruskington has two primary schools: Ruskington Winchelsea Primary School and Chestnut Street Church of England Primary School. Winchelsea was judged to be at a "good" standard when it was inspected by Ofsted in 2013; at which time it had 156 pupils on roll. Chestnut Street School converted to an academy in 2012; at its latest Ofsted inspection (2013), it had 293 pupils on roll and was judged to be at a "good" standard.

A national school was opened in 1868 to house 120 children and was not provided for by local rates under the Education Act 1902. In 1878, the Ruskington School was established and erected a school two years later; in 1903, the Board was abolished and the school became Ruskington Infants' Council School, provided for by local rates; in or about 1947 it was renamed Ruskington County School. The Winchelsea School replaced it, opening in 1974 and moving to its current, purpose-built site in 1992.

=== Secondary schools ===
The nearby town of Sleaford has three secondary schools, each of which were rated "good" standard at their latest Ofsted inspections: Carre's Grammar School (male grammar school), Kesteven and Sleaford High School Selective Academy (female grammar school) and St George's Academy (mixed non-selective secondary school). The grammar schools are based in Sleaford, but St George's operates across two sites (one at Sleaford, the other at Ruskington) where pupils are educated separately; the Sixth Form, however, is based solely at Sleaford. The school had 2247 pupils on roll in 2012, across both sites and including the Sixth Form. The grammar schools require students to sit the eleven-plus test and achieve a minimum score before applying; providing they fall within the catchment area, applicants are then given priority based on home location in the event of a tie. St George's is not selective, but gives priority based on home location in the event of it being over-subscribed.

In 1957, Ruskington County Secondary Modern School was officially opened. Renamed Coteland's Community School by 1999, the school was under-performing by the 1990s: closure was being considered in 1994 and, in 1997, the school's GCSE performances were ranked second-lowest in the country; however, under the guidance of headteacher David Veal (1994−2007), the school was recognised as one of the most improved schools in the country in 2000 and received a School Achievement Award for its progress between 2000 and 2002. In April 2007, a plan to merge St George's College of Technology in Sleaford with Lafford High School, Billinghay, and Aveland High School, Billingborough was announced; Coteland's was invited to join. After Veal's retirement in 2007, the Governors opted in and the school became part of the federation; in 2010, the Government authorised a scheme to merge St George's, Aveland and Coteland's into a single Academy.

== Religion ==
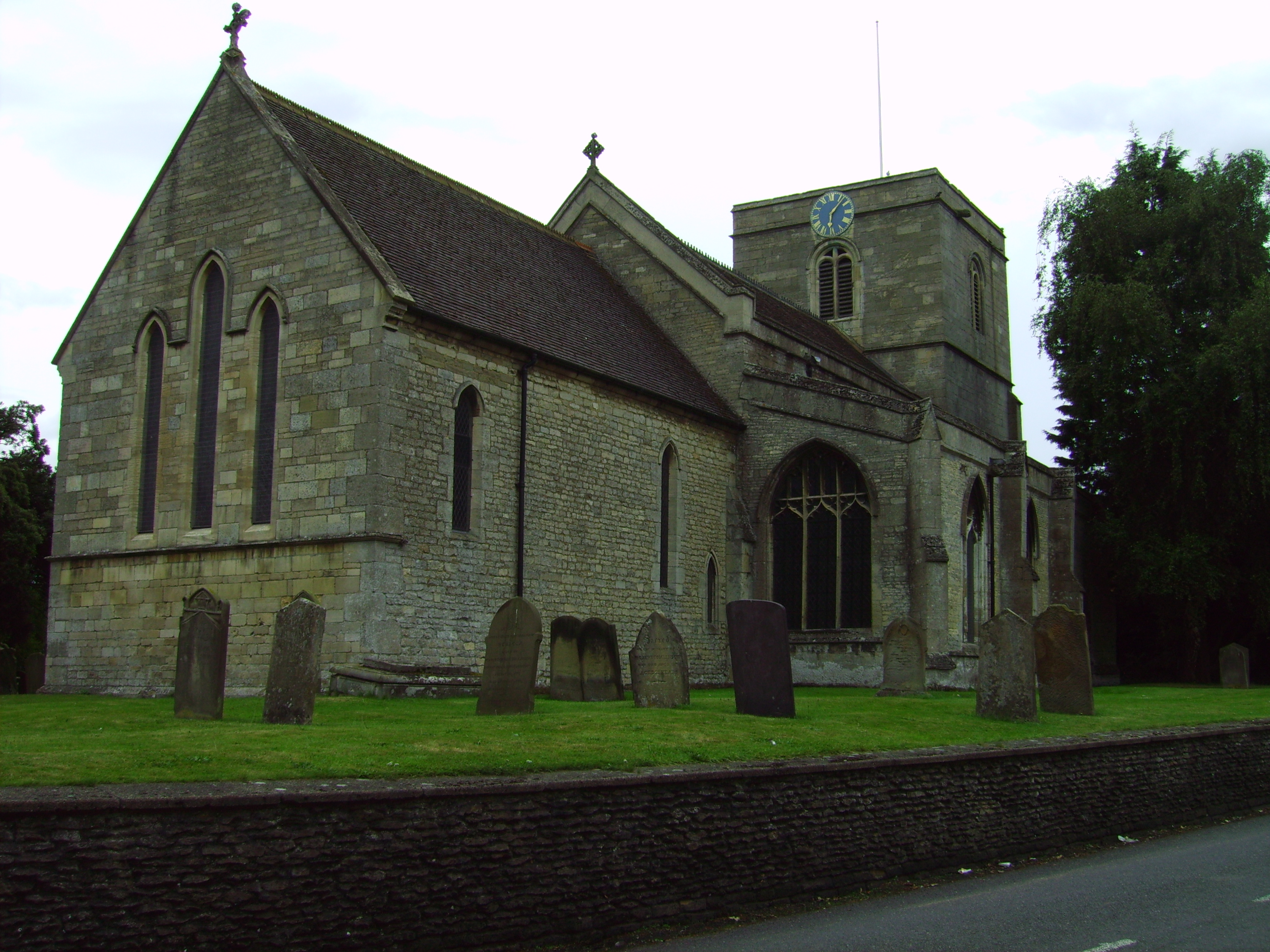
All Saints' Church

The village is served by several churches. The Anglican parish church is dedicated to All Saints is at the west end of the High Street. The Norman church was built in 1086 to replace an earlier, Anglo Saxon wooden structure. Parts of the tower are believed to date from 1086, but the chancel portion was built in the 13th–14th century. The tower was damaged in 1618 and rebuilt in 1620.

Other churches include the Ruskington Methodist Church, South Lincs Church (a Pentecostal church formerly known as Emmanuel Christian Centre) and the Ruskington Free Church.

== Culture ==
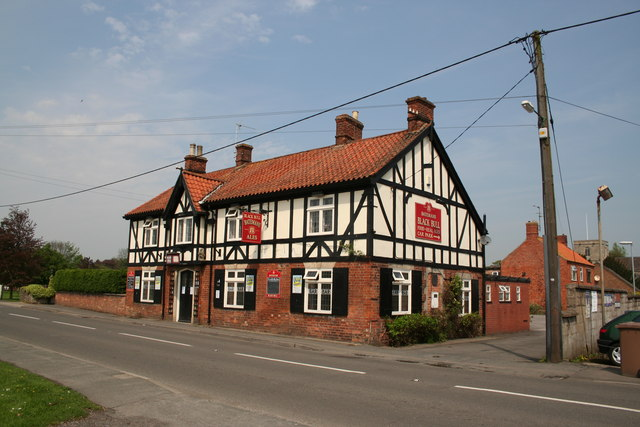
The Black Bull pub

=== Sport ===
The village has a bowls club and a junior football team called the Ruskington Lions. The Ruskington Lions girls' team is now entering a newly founded Lincolnshire County Intermediate Women's Football League. The village hall hosts a dance school on Saturdays, and another dance school is located on Brookside Close near the doctors' surgery.

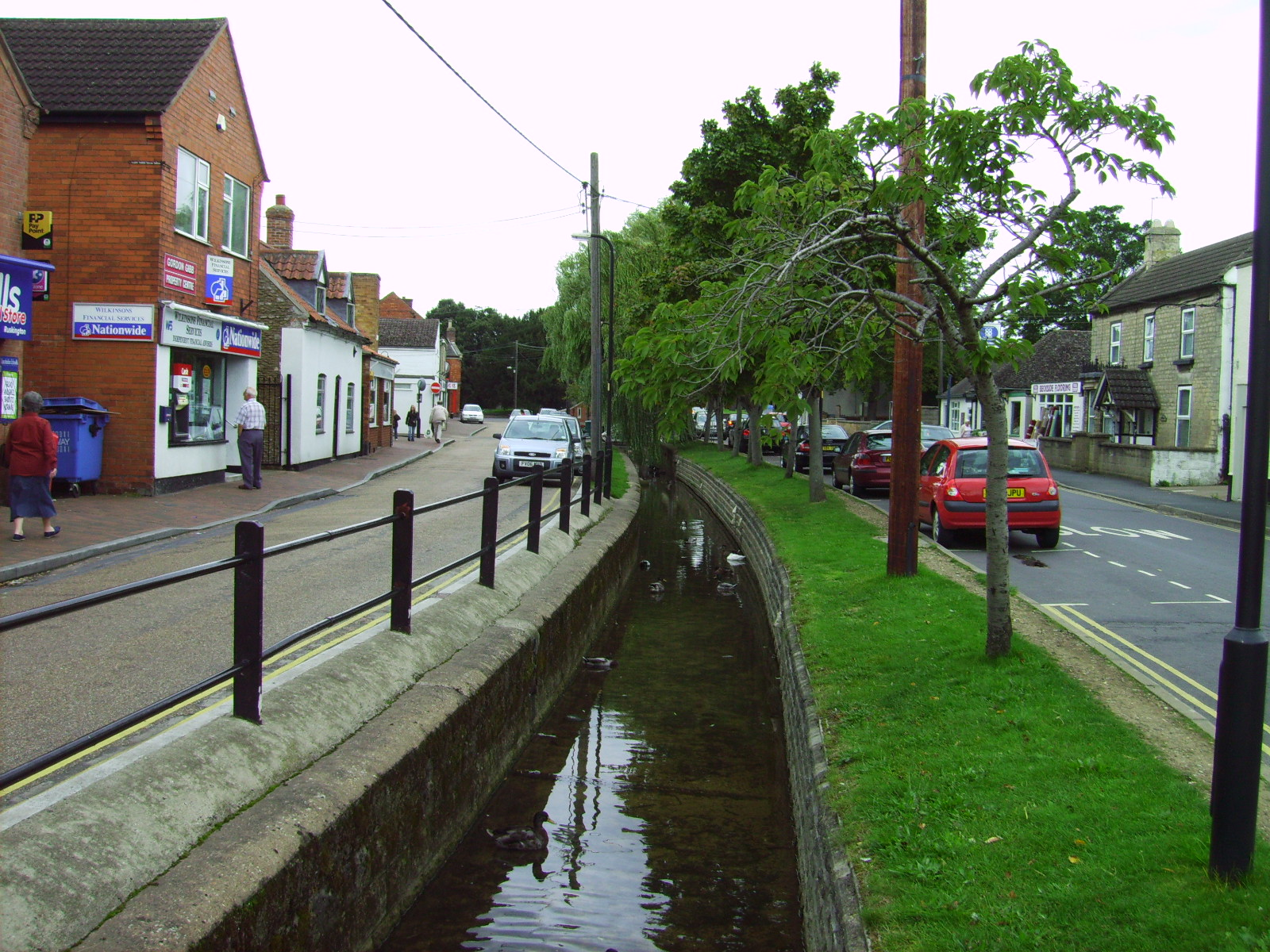
The Beck, looking west

== People from Ruskington ==
- George Davy Kelley, Labour MP from 1906 to 1910 for Manchester South West
- Sir Robert Pattinson, Liberal MP from 1922 to 1923 for Grantham
- Samuel Pattinson, Liberal MP from 1922 to 1924 for Horncastle
- Joseph Tomlinson, English-American bridge and lighthouse engineer
- John Gillespie Magee Jr., the war-time fighter pilot who wrote the celebrated poem High Flight, was killed aged nineteen near Ruskington after a mid-air collision
