= The Lafford High School =

Location
- Fen Road; Billinghay, Lincolnshire, N4 4HU; England

Information
- Type: Community school
- Established: 1963
- Closed: 31 August 2010
- Department for Education URN: 120637 Tables
- Ofsted: Reports
- Chairman of the Governors: Derek Daniels
- Headteacher: Paul Watson (resigned 2008) (Mrs N. Irvine as acting headteacher)
- Gender: Mixed
- Age: 11 to 16
- Enrolment: 40+ (2010)
- Capacity: 365 (2010)

The Lafford High School, Billinghay was a secondary-level, co-educational Community School in Billinghay, a village in the English county of Lincolnshire. Opened in 1963 to serve several villages near Billinghay, it accommodated pupils aged 11 to 16 before closing in 2010. The school used a secondary modern admissions system and had a capacity for 365 pupils at the time of its closure.

== History ==
=== Planning ===
The Education Act 1944 made secondary education available to all children up to the age of 15; a 'tripartite system' of secondary schools was established to provide curricula based on aptitude and ability: grammar schools for "academic" pupils, secondary moderns for practical studies, and technical schools for science and engineering. Pupils were allocated to them depending on their score in the eleven-plus examination. There was no dedicated secondary school in the district around Billinghay, so the village schools continued to take pupils up to the age of 14; because they lacked capacity to teach 14 to 15 year olds as well, a temporary HORSA school (Billinghay HORSA Centre) was opened at Billinghay after the Second World War. In 1946, the local education authority, Kesteven County Council, considered proposals to build a new secondary modern school at Billinghay; these plans were approved in 1947, with the school expected to be coeducational and take up to 450 pupils aged 11 to 16 when it opened (planned for sometime between 1952 and 1957).

The construction of the new school was delayed and, after it and two other proposed rural secondary schools (at Billingborough and at Corby Glen) were absent from the Ministry of Education's 1959–60 funding programme, a contingent of Kesteven County Councillors travelled to the ministry to make their case. They received commitments that the Billinghay school would be included in the 1960–61 programme. By 1961, funding had been approved for the Billinghay school and work was underway. The Sleaford Standard was optimistic about the benefits afforded by consolidating secondary education in larger dedicated schools, writing that "new heights of educational prowess will be achieved by the children ... There is a nostalgic regret in the thought of all the consequent decline that may ensue for the smallest village schools, but that will be a short-lived thing that cannot stand by comparison with the opportunities in life a fuller education may bring for the schoolchildren."

=== Opening ===
The secondary modern at Billinghay was completed in 1963, with teaching commencing on 23 April. The school did not have an official opening ceremony. The new building was a three-storey block built by Messrs H. H. Adkins (Contractors) Ltd, of Boston; it included a hall with stage and sound and lighting equipment; a gymnasium and changing rooms; a large kitchen; a library; administrative rooms; an art room; a general science laboratory; a needlework room; a domestic science room; a woodwork and metalwork room; and a rural science laboratory with a greenhouse. It was officially named The Lafford School. Accommodating boys and girls aged 11 to 16, there were 137 pupils on roll on the opening day, with the number expected to grow to between 270 and 300 by approximately 1967. The children came from the villages of Billinghay, North Kyme, South Kyme, Anwick, Walcott, Martin, Timberland and Witham Bank; those from Martin and Timberland had previously been sent to Ruskington Secondary Modern School, but existing pupils there had the option to choose to move over to Lafford, which some did. The first headmaster was J. T. Padgett and Dr D. Horton was the inaugural chairman of the governors. There were seven teaching staff (other than Padgett) on roll at the school's opening, plus a secretary, caretaker and assistant caretaker, a cook and four kitchen staff.

=== Operation: 1963 to 2005 ===
In the late 1970s, Lincolnshire County Council (Kesteven County Council's successor authority) debated proposals for comprehensivising Sleaford's schools, with the possibility of consolidating its three schools into two; opponents of the three-school approach argued that it would require closing Lafford to make it viable, unless the council expanded Lafford's catchment area, though the closure of Lafford was considered to be unpalatably expensive. In 1979, the County Council voted to preserve the three schools in Sleaford, and in the following September it increased the size of Lafford's catchment area as part of a policy of protecting the county's smaller rural schools. The catchment changes, which also affected the secondary modern schools at Ruskington and Billingborough, caused controversy amongst parents in affected areas and governors at the Sleaford Secondary Modern School, where the roll was expected to fall (along with the range of courses) to enable this policy. This led to more pupils being enrolled at Lafford, whose catchment now included Anwick, Billinghay, Dogdyke, Martin, Metheringham, North Kyme, South Kyme and Walcott. In 1982, Lincolnshire County Council approved funding for a £105,000 extension at Lafford, to be built in 1983, which added a science laboratory, design and technology room and cloakrooms to accommodate the increasing number of children on roll and deficiencies in the existing science and technology facilities. In 1984, the local authority also granted permission for the addition of a mobile classroom at Lafford.

The issue of its small roll returned again in October 1986, when a study commissioned by the County Council predicted that Lafford's roll would fall by 17% by 1996, and proposed closing the school in several options for consolidating schooling in the wider Sleaford area; doing nothing was assessed as being the most expensive option. In November that year, the County Council's schools sub-committee voted to retain Lafford and the other small schools, though there were concerns that the Education Reform Act 1988's provisions to enhance parental choice would reduce the roll at Lafford because more parents would be able to send their children to Sleaford's secondary modern school. In 1989, the local authority opened new buildings for Billinghay Church of England Controlled Primary School on a site adjacent to Lafford, and Lafford then shared its playing fields with the primary school. To accommodate the technology teaching requirements in the National Curriculum (introduced in 1988), a new design and textiles room was built at Lafford (costing £75,000) and the existing food technology room renovated in the mid-1990s; they were opened officially by the chef Prue Leith in January 1995. Lafford became a comprehensive school on 1 September 1995.

=== Federation: 2005 to 2008 ===
Between 1996 and 2001, the school's roll decreased "significantly" so that it sat at 183 pupils at the start of the 2001–2 year. In 2002, Ofsted recommended that Lincolnshire County Council review schools with under 600 pupils. Two years later, the Council's education officers suggested that some of these schools merge, close or federate to make them more economical. They included Lafford, which had been under-performing in GCSE and A-level league tables. St George's College of Technology in Sleaford became federated with Lafford in 2005 (St George's also federated with Aveland High School in Billingborough in 2006). A plan to merge them into an Academy was announced the following year; Coteland's School in Ruskington was allowed to opt-in, and joined the federation in 2007; with that, Paul Watson, principal at St George's, became executive head of all four schools.

=== Closure: 2008 to 2010 ===
Despite improvements, the village schools continued to perform below the national average. The County Council began consulting parents in 2008 about closing Lafford due to falling numbers. Despite denials from Watson, parents complained that he had lost "passion" for the school and that St George's "cherry-picked" the most able pupils. After a heated meeting with them in March 2008, Watson resigned as Principal at Lafford. By that time, the school had 250 pupils on roll (despite capacity for 400) and only 27 new starters in 2007–08. It was deemed unviable by the county council. A phased closure took place over the next two years, with pupils moving to schools in Sleaford, Ruskington and Branston. By 2010, the school roll had fallen to "over 40" pupils. Lafford closed on 31 August 2010. Its buildings were subsequently demolished.

== Headteachers ==
Years	Name	Notes
1963–1981	James Thomas "Jim" Padgett	A native of Nottinghamshire, Padgett was educated at Magnus Grammar School in Newark-on-Trent, the Coventry Training College and the University of Nottingham. He had been in the RAF in the Second World War, serving in the UK and Middle East. He then taught in Nottinghamshire schools until 1960, when he was appointed deputy headmaster at the Sir William Robertson School in Welbourn. He was appointed head of Lafford School in October 1962 and took up the position in January 1963. He retired from Lafford in August 1981 and died on 8 August 1988 at Lincoln.
1981–1997	John Hockin	A Cornishman, Hockin came to Kesteven in 1971 as a schools inspector. He subsequently taught at an approved school, before being appointed headmaster at the Lafford School in September 1981. He retired in April 1997. A member of the Sleaford Rotary Club since 1975, Hockin was elected vice-president of Rotary International British Isles for the 1998–99 year, and then served as president for the 1999–2000 year.
1997–1998	Kathy Farmer (acting)	Farmer served as acting headteacher for the 1997–98 academic year.
1998–2001	Paul Kern	Kern attended Loughborough University from 1971 to 1975, graduating with a BSc in chemistry and management. He then trained to be teacher at Loughborough College of Education. He was deputy head at St Wulfram's School, Grantham, when he was appointed headteacher at Lafford in July 1998. Kern had left Lafford in 2001.
2001–2002	Julie Woolley and Colin Saywell (acting)	Woolley was acting headteacher after Kern's departure in 2001 and was in post that October. Colin Saywell subsequently took over the role, and latterly shared it with Woolley before Taylor's arrival in 2002.
2002–2003	Martyn Taylor	Taylor taught American history at the University of Massachusetts before teaching in London, Hull and Lincolnshire. He was first deputy headteacher at The Thomes Cowley High School in Donington from 1998 to 2002. He was appointed headteacher at Lafford in June 2002. He was still in post in 2003.
2004–2005	Jenni Page	Page was a modern languages teacher who had taught in Nottinghamshire, Yorkshire and Lincolnshire. She was a deputy headteacher of the City of Lincoln Community College before she was appointed headteacher at Lafford in January 2004.
2005–2008	Paul Frederick Watson	Educated at Nottingham and Leicester Universities, Watson then taught in Yorkshire and Lincolnshire. He helped to establish the Lincoln School of Science and Technology and was appointed its deputy headteacher in 1992, before he was seconded to Middlefield School of Technology in Gainsborough as acting deputy headteacher; he eventually became the school's head. He became principal at St George's College of Technology in Sleaford in 1998, and headteacher at Lafford after it federated with St George's in 2005. He resigned as headteacher at Lafford in 2008, remaining in post at St George's and the other schools in the federation. He retired from teaching in 2014.
2008–2010	Mrs N. J. Irvine (acting)	Irvine became acting headteacher after Watson's resignation in 2008. She was still acting headteacher when the school closed in 2010.

== Notable former pupils ==
- Air Vice-Marshal Stuart Butler, former Nimrod pilot, commanded 206 Sqn and Station Commander of RAF Kinloss

== See also ==
- Education in Lincolnshire

== Bibliography ==
- Ward, Stephen; Eden, Christine (2009), Key Issues in Education Policy, London: SAGE Publications Ltd., ISBN 9781446243619
