= Coteland's School Ruskington =

Former secondary school in Lincolnshire, England

Location
- Sleaford Road; Ruskington, Lincolnshire, NG34 9BY; England

Information
- Type: Community school
- Established: 1956 (officially opened 1957)
- Closed: 31 December 2009
- Department for Education URN: 120634 Tables
- Ofsted: Reports
- Principal: Paul Watson; Ruth Kelly (vice-principal, Ruskington)
- Gender: Mixed
- Age: 11 to 16
- Capacity: 378 (December 2009)

Coteland's School Ruskington was a secondary-level community school in the village of Ruskington, Lincolnshire, accommodating pupils aged 11–16 through years 7 to 11. It formally opened as Ruskington Secondary Modern School in 1957, although teaching had begun the previous year. It federated with St George's College of Technology in nearby Sleaford in 2007, and then closed at the end of 2009 to allow the schools to merge into St George's Academy. The buildings and grounds were significantly redeveloped in 2012–2015 to serve as a satellite school for the academy.

== History ==
=== Origins ===
The Education Act 1944 made secondary education available to all children up to the age of 15; a "tripartite system" of secondary schools was established to provide curricula based on aptitude and ability: grammar schools for "academic" pupils, secondary moderns for practical studies, and technical schools for science and engineering. Pupils were allocated to them depending on their score in the eleven-plus examination.

In 1947, Kesteven County Council outlined its 15-year plan for secondary education, which included the construction of a new secondary modern school at Ruskington. The buildings were completed in the 1950s and teaching commenced at Ruskington Secondary Modern School in 1956; the buildings were officially opened by Sir John Wolfenden, Vice-Chancellor of the University of Reading, the following year. Built on a 9-acre (3.6 ha) site at a cost of £100,658, the new school buildings consisted of a three-storeys of classrooms and a gymnasium, assembly/dining hall, library and greenhouse. The buildings were built around a prefabricated steel frame and modular concrete blocks clad in brick. Much of the site was devoted to playing fields, which were supplemented by eight grass tennis courts and playground. The first headmaster was George Morris Butler, who served until 1976; he was appointed to the role in 1955, while the school was still unfinished. Councillor J. H. Brighton was the chairman of the governors at the school's opening.

=== 1950s to 1980s: Early years ===
When Ruskington Secondary Modern School was officially opened in 1957, it had 300 pupils on roll. By 1959, the school's roll had reached 500, and in 1972, the school leaving age was raised from 15 to 16.

To accommodate this growing population, temporary classrooms were added to the site; 8 had been installed by 1976. A library and a new kitchen were also added in the school's first quarter-century. However, a more substantial extension did not materialise for many years; in 1964, the County Council failed to obtain land off Sleaford Road which would have been used for potential future building. By the late 1970s, it was expected that the roll would rise to 600 in 1981. In 1976, the government offered a grant of £300,000 to fund a permanent extension to the secondary modern, but, despite support from the Education Committee's chairman Ralph Bennett, other councillors (including Tom Hall from Ruskington, Eric Fairchild, Reg Brealey and the Finance Committee chairman David Guttridge) delayed take up by referring the plans to the Finance Committee for investigation. Hall, Brealey and Fairchild stated that the added demand could be met by spending £75,000 on more temporary classrooms, and it was noted that implementation depended on the shape of the proposed comprehensive school changeover in the Sleaford area, which Brealey and Fairchild were hotly contesting. Bennett argued that temporary classrooms would not provide the extra gymnasium, toilets and hall which the school needed. 18 teachers from the Ruskington school wrote an open letter criticising Hall's decision, but the County Council ultimately did not take up the funding in the 1976–77 year (by which time they estimated the extensions would cost £529,900). The next new building work would be the opening of a new laboratory in 1981.

In the mid-1980s, the school roll declined; in 1986, a task group set up by the County Council included the secondary modern's closure as one of its options to deal with county-wide declining rolls, though it noted that Ruskington was unusual among small schools because its roll was expected to rise again by over 8% as the local population expanded. In November that year, the County Council's schools sub-committee voted to keep all of the small schools, though there were concerns that the Education Reform Act 1988's provisions to enhance parental choice would further reduce the roll at Ruskington Secondary Modern because more parents would be able to send their children to Sleaford's secondary modern school.

=== 1990s and early 2000s: Threat of closure and rapid improvement ===
In 1990, the County Council changed the name to Coteland's School, after the lost settlement of Coteland which is attested in medieval documents and was likely located on land in nearby Anwick and possibly in Ruskington.

In 1993, Coteland's was again threatened with closure due to declining rolls, as parents began sending children to other schools; it was operating at half capacity, with 170 pupils on roll. David Veal took over as head-teacher in 1994 and later recalled that there was "a stigma attached to the school", which he suggested contributed to pupils lacking self-esteem and becoming demotivated, a matter compounded by the eleven-plus exam which primary school leavers sat. Budget restrictions had also reduced the number of staff. According to The Independent, Ruskington was then a village of about 6,000 people, "many working in local food-processing factories, in agriculture or in nearby RAF bases on lowish incomes", and "very few professional families" sent children to Coteland's. Many of the most academic pupils from local primary schools were instead choosing to attend the grammar schools in Sleaford after passing the eleven-plus exam; in 1994, there were only three children in the school who were classed as "above-average" in terms of academic ability. By 1998, Coteland's was ranked the second-worst school in Britain when 2% of pupils attained five GCSEs at grades A*–C. But by 2001, this had increased to 38%, making it one of the most improved school's in the country. Veal said this was largely due to changing the "ethos ... so parents can be confident it is somewhere pupils can learn."

A new technology block was built at the school (in 1998–99) with three classrooms and a corridor link to the old block; funded by £360,000 from the New Deal for Schools programme, it was the first new building at the school in almost two decades and replaced three mobile classrooms.

=== 2005–10: Federation ===
In 2002, Ofsted recommended that Lincolnshire County Council review schools with under 600 pupils. Two years later, the council's education officers suggested that some of these schools merge, close or federate to make them more economical. St George's College of Technology in the nearby market town of Sleaford merged with two small village schools—Lafford High School and Aveland High School—in 2005 and 2006 respectively. A plan to merge them into an Academy was announced the following year; Coteland's was allowed to opt-in. When David Veal retired as headteacher of Coteland's in 2007, the school joined the federation; with that, Paul Watson became executive head of all four schools. Following a heated meeting with parents, Watson resigned as head of Lafford in 2008, and the school closed two years later. One writer for The Times Educational Supplement pointed out the GCSE results for the smaller schools would be effectively "cancelled out" by St George's results if they merged, regardless of whether they improve. The County Council's leader, Martin Hill, commented that "It will secure first class secondary provision for both the Coteland's School and the Aveland High School".

=== 2010 onwards: Merger into St George's Academy ===
A feasibility report indicated that Aveland was not sustainable due to falling enrolment and would have to close; instead the remaining two sites would be redeveloped with £20 million of Government funding as part of the academy conversion. A consultation process took place in June and July 2009 and received 127 responses, 85 of which were positive. In September 2009, the County Council published a statutory notice that St George's, Coteland's and Aveland would close and a new academy would open in their place; Aveland was deemed unsustainable and would be wound down in 2011, but up to £20m could be given the new academy to refurbish the other sites. With the notice period over, the County Council decided to back the proposals on 1 December 2009. The scheme was approved by the Secretary of State for Education and, after officially closing on the last day of 2009, Coteland's was merged with St George's and Aveland to become St George's Academy on 4 January 2010.

The school buildings at Ruskington were demolished in 2012 and work began on a new school as part of the academy development plans. Following extensive redevelopment, the new campus buildings were officially opened on 6 November 2015.

== Structure ==
Coteland's School was a state-run community school serving pupils aged 11 to 16. The school was coeducational, with a capacity for 378 pupils.

== Headteachers ==
Headteachers
Years	Name	Notes
1955–1976	George Morris Butler	Schooled at the grammar schools in Brigg and Scunthorpe, Butler attended the University of Leeds between 1932 and 1935, graduating with a BA; he then completed a diploma in education in 1936. He was an assistant master at Brumby Secondary Modern Boys' School in Brumby (1936–40) before serving in the Royal Tank Corps and Intelligence Corps in the Second World War, including in the Middle East; he ended the war with the rank of captain. Demobilised in 1946, he returned to his old school in Brumby, but in 1947 was appointed headmaster of Epworth County School in Epworth, where he remained until he became headmaster of Ruskington Secondary Modern School in 1955, ahead of its opening in January 1956. He retired in December 1976, and died in 2004.
1977–1994	Dr Brian Humphreys Edwards	Edwards was raised in Cheshire, gained a degree in biological sciences from the University of Birmingham in 1957 and received a Certificate of Education from the University of Liverpool in 1958. He taught mathematics and biology at schools in Sheffield and Liverpool, before he spent 13 years at the Kesteven College of Education, a teacher-training institution; he was latterly head of the department of social and environmental studies there. While at the college, he completed a PhD in education part-time at the University of Nottingham in 1975. He was appointed headteacher at the Ruskington Secondary Modern School in January 1977. Edwards retired in 1994. His wife Hazel was a lecturer at the Kesteven College of Education in 1976.
1994–2007	David Veal	Veal was born in Ruskington, but grew up in nearby Dorrington where he attended primary school; after studying at Carre's Grammar School in Sleaford, he completed a chemistry degree at the University of Bradford. From 1973 to 1980, Veal taught science (for three years) and then PE (for four years) at Ruskington Secondary Modern School, before he moved to South Park High School in Lincoln. He then transferred to the Earl of Scarbrough High School in Skegness, where he was deputy head from 1988 until he was appointed headteacher at Coteland's in 1994. Veal retired from Coteland's in 2007.
2007–2009	Paul Frederick Watson	Educated at Nottingham and Leicester Universities, Watson then taught in Yorkshire and Lincolnshire. He helped to establish the Lincoln School of Science and Technology and was appointed its deputy headteacher in 1992, before he was seconded to Middlefield School of Technology in Gainsborough as acting deputy headteacher; he eventually became the school's head. He became principal at St George's College of Technology in Sleaford in 1998, and then headteacher at Coteland's after it federated with St George's in 2007. He retired in 2014.

David Beams was acting headteacher for three years from 1984 to 1987 while Brian Edwards was conducting an inquiry into education across the UK. Having previously taught in Swindon and Watford, David Hector Harvey Beams was the deputy headteacher at the school from 1967 until 1989; he taught at Ruskington Secondary Modern School for another year, before working as a supply teacher from 1990 to 1995. He died, aged 62, at Grantham in 1995.

During Watson's tenure as headteacher of the federated schools, he appointed Ruth Kelly to be vice-principal responsible for the Ruskington site.
