= St George's Academy =

Location
- Westgate; Sleaford, Lincolnshire, NG34 7PS; England; 53°00′00″N 0°24′50″W

Information
- Type: Comprehensive secondary school and Sponsor-led academy
- Motto: Aiming High to Achieve Excellence for All
- Established: 2010 (1908)
- Trust: St George's Academy Trust
- Department for Education URN: 136044 Tables
- Ofsted: Reports
- Chairman of the Governors: Graham Arnold and Nigel Horner
- Principal: Amanda Money
- Gender: Mixed
- Age: 11 to 19
- Enrolment: 2,220 (February 2015)
- Houses: Phipps, Logan, Lovell, Rooksby, Godfrey (Sleaford); Holland, Kesteven and Lindsey (Ruskington)
- Website: www.st-georges-academy.org

St George's Academy is a co-educational comprehensive secondary school based in the English market town of Sleaford in Lincolnshire, with a satellite school at nearby Ruskington.

Its origins date to 1908, when Sleaford Council School opened at Church Lane to meet the growing demand for elementary education in the town. After the Education Act 1944, the senior department became a secondary modern under the name Sleaford Secondary Modern School. A second school was constructed piecemeal at Westholme in the 1950s and early 1960s and expanded in 1983, allowing the Church Lane site to close; to mark the occasion, it was renamed St George's School. After it became grant-maintained, the school became a comprehensive, received a Technology specialism, became a Technology College in 1994 and later converted to Foundation status. Throughout the 1990s and 2000s, new buildings were added to the site. Coteland's School in Ruskington federated with St George's in 2007; they merged to form the Academy in 2010. The conversion included a government grant of £20 million to carry out extensive building work on both sites, completed in 2012 at Sleaford and in 2015 at Ruskington.

The Sleaford school opened with a capacity for 600 pupils in 1908, but St George's had over 2,230 on roll across both sites in 2021, including the Sixth Form; the Ruskington site, with roughly 350 pupils, makes up a small proportion of the total. Pupils generally sit examinations for General Certificate of Secondary Education (GCSE) or equivalent vocational qualifications in Year Eleven (aged 15–16), and they have a choice of three or four A-levels or vocational options in the sixth form, which is part of the Sleaford Joint Sixth Form consortium with the town's single-sex grammar schools. In 2019, the school received an "average" Progress 8 score; 31% of pupils achieved English and mathematics GCSEs at grade 5 or above, which was lower than the national figure. The average A-Level grade in 2019 was a C, slightly below the national figure; the government's progress score for the Sixth Form is "well below average". An Office for Standards in Education, Children's Services and Skills (Ofsted) inspection in 2015 graded St George's Academy as "good" in every category. This rating was confirmed following a short inspection in 2019.

== History ==
=== Elementary school ===
During most of the 19th century, schooling in England was provided either on a fee-paying basis or by the Church. To ensure that all children had access to elementary education, the Forster Act 1870 set up Local School Boards to provide elementary schools for all children aged 5 to 10. From 1880, schooling became compulsory for that age group. The Education Act 1902 consolidated these boards into local education authorities and allowed them to subsidise schools with money raised from local rate-payers. Alongside a grammar school for boys, a private school for girls and a mixed National School, Sleaford had four elementary schools in 1905: two Wesleyan (one was for infants), one Catholic and one other infants school. The construction of the Bass maltings (1901–06) and the Rauceby Asylum (1897–1902) led to an increase in the town's population and school inspectors found that the four schools could not accommodate every child in the town. The indebted Wesleyan schools could not afford any enlargements so the town's elementary school managers opted for Kesteven County Council to take responsibility under the 1902 Act. The Council built a schoolhouse on Church Lane at the cost of £11,500, which opened as Sleaford Council School on 4 May 1908. The staff and pupils at the Wesleyan schools were transferred there; its first headmaster was H. H. Godfrey, who had been master at the Wesleyan school. Built with a capacity of 600 pupils, 280 were on roll when teaching commenced.

From the outset, the school was run as an elementary school with an infants' department. In 1918, the Fisher Act raised the school leaving age to 14 and many schools subsequently split into junior and senior departments; to accommodate senior children at Sleaford Council School, the County Council proposed formally introducing separate departments, one for infants and junior pupils (those aged below 10), and another for the remaining (senior) pupils. The Board of Education approved these plans in 1922. In 1935 the County Council reorganised schooling in Sleaford so that the Council School's senior department received all the town's children in elementary education aged over 10. The Board of Education sanctioned these changes on the condition that new classrooms be added to the Council school to accommodate Senior pupils and a new Infants' department be erected at the site. Financial setbacks and delays over the purchasing of land meant that the new Infants' school was not completed until 1939.

=== Secondary Modern and new site ===
The Education Act 1944 made secondary education available to all children up to the age of 15; a 'tripartite system' of secondary schools was established to provide curricula based on aptitude and ability: grammar schools for "academic" pupils, secondary moderns for practical studies, and technical schools for science and engineering. Pupils were allocated to them depending on their score in the eleven-plus examination. The Senior department at the Sleaford Council School became its own school in March 1945 and was designated a secondary modern. Earlier post-war plans had envisaged the Church Lane school being restricted to boys only and a separate secondary modern school for girls being built at Westholme, an area of parkland owned by the County Council (Kesteven and Sleaford High School would also be rebuilt there), but these proposals did not come to fruition. Instead, HORSA huts at the site were acquired for the still-mixed Sleaford Secondary Modern School; teaching took place there during the 1950s and new classrooms were added during the decade. In January 1956, many pupils were transferred to a new secondary modern school at nearby Ruskington, allowing pupils from other villages to come to Sleaford; previously they had been forced to stay in their village schools until they reached 14, and then spend the last year of study at Sleaford.

In 1957 the Secondary Education Sub-Committee of the County Council amended its earlier plans; it now proposed to build a new mixed secondary modern school at Westholme to replace the Church Lane school, which would become a further education college. It would be allocated over 18 acres (7.3 ha) of the parkland at Westholme. In 1961, a new school building at Westholme had opened with an assembly hall, five classes and kitchens. This was the first phase of a proposed building programme which would have built a whole new school on the Westholme site with an enlarged assembly hall, a library, gymnasium and classrooms capable of accommodating 750 pupils across five forms (year groups), fulfilling the council's ambition to consolidate the secondary modern onto the Westholme site (the old HORSA huts would have also been demolished). However, in the interim, the Church Lane premises were still being used: Sleaford Secondary Modern was now split between its old buildings there and the new ones at the Westholme site. While the plans were approved locally, central government funding for the next phase of development at Westholme was indefinitely paused in the early 1960s, leaving the dual school system in place.

=== Comprehensive debate ===
The educational opportunities for secondary modern pupils were limited compared to those at grammar schools, prompting criticism of the selection system; grammar schools and the eleven plus were also criticised for alienating working-class families. A reluctance to improve secondary moderns or expand grammar schools under the Conservatives prompted the Labour Government to issue Circular 10/65 in 1965 which requested local education authorities convert to a comprehensive system.

Following the introduction of comprehensive schooling in the north of Kesteven, plans were drawn up in 1970 for rolling out comprehensive schooling in the Sleaford area. This scheme proposed expanding Carre's and the High School as co-educational comprehensive schools (for 11–18 year olds) with the secondary modern being abolished and Westholme becoming both schools' playing fields. In 1971, Sleaford parents voted in favour of comprehensive education in the town (by 842 votes to 803), but rejected the Council's proposals (528 votes for, compared with 1,103 against). New plans were unveiled in 1972–73: the High School and the Secondary Modern sites were to become mixed 11–16 schools and Carre's would become a sixth form college. (Note: The proposal involved the abolition of the eleven-plus examination and the establishment of five co-educational comprehensive schools at Sleaford Secondary Modern, Sleaford High, Ruskington Secondary Modern, Lafford High and Billingborough Secondary Modern, with Carre's being converted into a sixth form college.) The proposals were controversial, with some councillors questioning whether the system was being "forced" onto communities and citing higher costs". Parents voted for the plans (1,199 to 628), albeit with a 50% turnout. The County Council approved them, but allowed governors a veto. Following negotiations with governors at Carre's, the scheme was revised in 1974 so that Carre's and the High School became 11–18 schools; the secondary modern would be closed, Westholme absorbed by the High School and the Church Lane site by Carre's.

During the comprehensivation debate, the secondary modern remained split across its two sites and the second phase of building at Westholme remained uncommenced; one councillor said that it was "the worst secondary modern in Lincolnshire as far as accommodation is concerned". In 1974, staff wrote a highly critical letter to the county council concerning the poor standard of facilities at the school, noting its split-site, aging temporary accommodation and Edwardian Church Lane site. They noted that: "there have been several attempts ... to arrive at a suitable scheme for comprehensive education in the area, none of them so far put into operation ... we feel that we have waited too long for ... something more positive [to be done] about our accommodation problems."

Despite these calls for action and support for the new comprehensive scheme from most staff and all three headteachers, the new Lincolnshire County Council voted to return the scheme for further consultation in January 1975, a move the Sleaford Standard called "politically motivated". Two of the leading opponents, councillors Eric Fairchild and Reg Brealey, were governors at the secondary modern and Brealey was a former pupil. The latter proposed a three-school system, arguing it offered more choice: the secondary modern would be consolidated at Westholme as a single-site 11–16 school; Carre's and the High School would operate Sixth Forms. Fairchild argued that this would be more popular and cheaper. The Education Act 1976 rejected the principle of selection in state schooling and empowered the government to compel local authorities to convert their schools to comprehensive schemes. After the Government ordered the Council to submit a comprehensive proposal in 1977, it voted to submit the three-school system, which had become popular with parents and was championed by Brealey, who had become chairman of the Governors. But, the Labour Education Secretary, Shirley Williams, dismissed the proposals in 1978 on grounds that the Sixth Forms would be too small. The council then voted against the two-school system again. (Note: Brealey remained chairman of the governors until 1998. He was also a businessman who at various times chaired Sheffield United FC and owned the jute manufacturer Titaghur and its subsidiary Knoydart.)

=== St George's: rebuilding, growth and specialist status ===
In the 1979 general election, Margaret Thatcher's Conservative government came to power and shortly afterwards it repealed much of the Education Act 1976 and thus allowed local authorities to retain grammar schools (where they still existed) through the Education Act 1979. In Lincolnshire, the Council shifted focus towards retaining its remaining grammar schools (like those in the Sleaford area) and improving schools where work had been put on hold during the comprehensive debate; despite 90% of English councils adopting comprehensive education, Lincolnshire had resisted. In 1979, the schools sub-committee recommended that the Westholme site be rebuilt. By December, the Council had approved the consolidation of the school at Westholme, but the catchment area was decreased in 1980 to protect the smaller schools at Ruskington, Billingborough and Billinghay, causing controversy amongst parents in affected areas and governors at the school. (Note: The changes came into effect in September 1980 and reduced Sleaford Secondary Modern School's catchment to just the villages of Kirkby la Thorpe, Leasingham, North Rauceby, Sleaford and Wilsford. Parents from outside these areas could still apply for a "parental choice" exemption if there were spaces available at the school, but decisions were at the discretion of the governors (17 were granted places through this route for the 1980–81 year). This had the greatest effect on residents of Cranwell (whose children now had to attend the secondary modern school at Ruskington) and Heckington and Helpringham (which were placed in the Aveland High School's catchment zone); the policy was intended to reduce Sleaford Secondary Modern School's roll from around 800 pupils in 1979 to about 500 pupils by the time subsequent cohorts had filled the school.) A new building was constructed at Westholme between 1981 and 1983, allowing the Church Lane site to close in 1983−84. Reg Brealey donated £250,000 in 1982 towards the establishment of a languages centre, which opened in 1985. To commemorate the new buildings and the end of the dual-site format, the Board of Governors voted to adopt a new name: St George's School, which came into effect from September 1984. A new badge, to be worn on pupil's blazers, was designed by pupil Stephen Robinson: it featured a gold sword atop a red dragon on a blue shield, bordered with gold, all above a scroll with the motto Loyalty.

The English block at St George's Academy's Sleaford site (opened 1994).

On New Years Day 1991, St George's became grant-maintained; later that year, it announced plans to convert to a comprehensive school; the status was granted the following February. In 1992, it was awarded Technology School status, which was accompanied by a Government grant of £500,000 and a gift of £250,000 made by Reg Brealey; these contributed to the construction of a Science and Technology building, which opened in 1994. Sponsored by Brealey, St George's was one of the first schools designated a Technology College (a specialist school) in England in February 1994, a status renewed in 1997. More extensions followed: an English building in 1994, a library with art and physics classrooms in 1997–99, a sports hall in 2001, and a science building in 2005. In 2000, the Technology College status was renewed for the second time and the school received the Schools Curriculum and Sportsmark awards and was recognised as the 10th most improved specialist school in the country. After the abolition of grant-maintained status in 1998, St George's converted to a Foundation School.

=== Federation, merger and conversion to an Academy ===
In 2002, Ofsted recommended that Lincolnshire County Council review schools with under 600 pupils. Two years later, the Council's education officers suggested that some of these schools merge, close or federate to make them more economical. One such school was Lafford High in Billinghay, which had been under-performing in GCSE and A-level league tables. St George's became federated with Lafford and another small village school, Aveland High in Billingborough in 2005 and 2006 respectively. A plan to merge them into an Academy was announced the following year; Coteland's School in Ruskington was allowed to opt-in. When David Veal retired as headteacher of Coteland's in 2007, the school joined the federation; with that, Paul Watson became executive head of all four schools. Despite improvements, the village schools were performing below the national average and Aveland was one of the lowest performing schools academically in Lincolnshire. The County Council began consulting parents in 2008 about closing Lafford due to falling numbers. Despite denials from Watson, parents complained that he had lost "passion" for the school and that St George's "cherry-picked" the most able pupils. After a heated meeting with them in 2008, Watson resigned as Principal at Lafford and the school closed in 2010.

St George's Academy, Sleaford: the south face of the main block opened in 2012 following the conversion to an academy

The first Academy plans outlined a £24 million grant for rebuilding Aveland and refurbishing Lafford. Despite a delay in 2008, the scheme was revived the following year: the three remaining schools would merge and up to £40 million of funds were being considered to pay for the redevelopment of each site. The chairman of the governors, Graham Arnold, pledged to raise £2 million towards the scheme. A feasibility report indicated that Aveland was not sustainable due to falling enrolment and would have to close; instead the remaining two sites would be redeveloped with £20 million of Government funding. The scheme was approved and, on 4 January 2010, St George's combined with Coteland's and Aveland to become St George's Academy. As planned, September 2012 saw the Billingborough site close and the remaining pupils transfer to the other sites. The 1960s part of the Sleaford site was demolished and main building and sixth form centre constructed in its place (opening in 2012), while new science and IT buildings were added and a new IT system rolled out; the original post-war buildings at the Ruskington site were pulled down and a new school built across two phases which were completed in 2015.

== School structure ==
St George's Academy is a coeducational, non-selective secondary school and Sixth Form serving pupils aged between 11 and 18. It converted to an Academy on 1 January 2010 and is run by St George's Academy Trust. It is sponsored by the University of Lincoln, Lincolnshire County Council and Graham Arnold, who is the main sponsor. (Note: Being an Academy means that it receives funding directly from central government rather than a local education authority, and is run by a trust on behalf of the government; until 2010, Academies needed sponsors who were required to provide at least £2m towards it.) The school operates across two sites: one at Westholme, Sleaford, and the other in Ruskington, which approximately 350 pupils attended in 2016. The school has a maximum capacity of 2,200 pupils; as of September 2021, there are 2,232 pupils on roll. 18.7% of these pupils receive free school meals.

As of 2019–20, St George's can admit up to 380 pupils annually. It admits all those with Statements of Special Education Needs which name the school, followed (in order) by looked after children, children with siblings already at the school and then other children with priority given to those living closest to the school. Upon admission, pupils are allocated a mixed ability form, where they are registered, taught Life Skills and have access to pastoral support from their tutors. For most other lessons, pupils are set by ability. Each year group has a progress manager with responsibility for the students in that year. Since the Education Act 2002, years 7, 8 and 9 have been grouped into Key Stage 3 and years 10 and 11 into Key Stage 4, which co-ordinates how the National Curriculum is taught. At St George's, a manager is assigned to each Key Stage for pastoral support.

There is capacity for 450 pupils in the Sixth Form, including at least 50 people from outside the Academy (though more may be admitted if fewer people remain at the school after year 11). Along with Carre's Grammar School and Kesteven and Sleaford High School Selective Academy, St George's is part of the Sleaford Joint Sixth Form, which was founded in 1983. (Note: The High School left the Joint Sixth Form in 2010, but returned in 2016.) It provides a common timetable across both sites and allows for pupils to choose from A-Level options offered at either schools. Pupils may apply to be based at either school, where their pastoral and tutorial activities take place. Pupils are required meet minimum grade requirements for their subject choices and may have interviews to revise offers where appropriate. The Sixth Form has been based in the Arnold Centre since 2012.

Before the conversion to Academy status, the school uniform consisted of a navy-blue blazer with the school emblem sewn on, a white shirt, navy-blue tie and dark-grey trousers (girls could wear plain-blue skirts) for all pupils in years 7–10; year 11 pupils could wear a dark-blue jumper, shirt and grey trousers. Since 2010, girls no longer wear ties, and must wear a revere collar blouse. Dark-grey trousers or a pleated dark-grey skirt are available for girls to wear; boys have dark-grey trousers. All pupils wear a blue blazer, but those in Key Stage 3 have bright blue piping on their lapels; shirts are white until Year 11, when thin blue stripes are worn.

== Curriculum ==
=== Key Stages 3 and 4 ===
The school follows the National Curriculum in years 7–11 and offers a range of GCSEs (national exams taken by pupils aged 14–16), A-Levels (national exams taken by pupils aged 16–18) and vocational equivalents. The school has no affiliation with a particular religious denomination, but religious education is given throughout the school, and pupils may opt to take the subject as part of their GCSE course. Although morning assemblies take place and are Christian in nature, they are non-denominational; in some cases, local clergy attend as guest speakers. Pupils participate in a number of educational visits throughout their school career and year 10 and year 12 pupils are offered the opportunity to participate in a work experience programme, which usually lasts for one week.

For Key Stage 3 pupils, the curriculum comprises English, mathematics, science, technology, a modern foreign language, art, music, computing, geography, history, religious education (RE), physical education (PE), and a life skills programme, incorporating citizenship, sex and relationships education and personal and social education. The school offers French, Spanish and German as foreign languages. The use of ICT is central to all teaching and is taught as a subject in Key Stage 3.

In Key Stage 4 (Years 10 and 11), pupils study a core curriculum comprising English, mathematics, science, PE, RE and citizenship. They are required to take GCSEs in English language and English literature, mathematics and science; students can then select further courses from four option blocks, including one of either history or geography as well as a modern foreign language for those deemed capable of achieving the English Baccalaureate, a vocational subject completed in years 9 and 10, and an open option for any other subjects. Science courses are based on ability; pupils who progress at a high level may study for three separate science qualifications (GCSEs in biology, chemistry and physics); all other pupils complete the Combined Science GCSE. As of 2019–20, the school offers other GCSE courses in art, craft and design; computing; electronics/product design; German; fine art; French; media studies; PE; RE and Spanish GCSE qualifications. Vocational courses are also offered at Level 2, including art and design, business studies, child care, construction, creative media production, early years education and care, health and social care, hospitality, music, PE, performing arts, public services, and travel and tourism.

=== Sixth Form ===
The Joint Sixth Form allows pupils to choose from around 60 vocational or academic subjects including: A-Levels in biology; chemistry; computing; design engineering; drama; English language and/or literature; French; history; geography; German; fashion and textiles; law; mathematics; further mathematics; media studies; philosophy, ethics and religion; photography; physical education; physics; product design; psychology; sociology and Spanish. Separate A-Level or BTEC/CTEC options in art, drama and photography; business; computing; performing arts; and travel and tourism; applied science; and other diplomas or certificates in bricklaying, carpentry, childcare, early years practice, health and social care, hospitality, physical education and uniformed services.

=== Examinations and pupil destinations ===
The government's Progress 8 score measures how far pupils at the school progress academically between Key Stages 2 and 4 compared with pupils across the country with similar results to them. The score for St George's Academy in 2019 was "average" (-0.03, with a confidence interval between -0.17 and 0.1), meaning that pupils do about as well as those with similar previous attainment nationally. That year, 31% of pupils attained GCSEs in English and mathematics at grade 5 or higher (equivalent to a high C or low B in the old grading system); this compared with 43% nationally. Its Attainment 8 score (measuring how well pupils scored in eight subjects including English, mathematics, three English Baccalaureate subjects and three other approved subjects) was 44.7%, compared with 46.3% nationally. In 2019, 7% of pupils achieved the English Baccalaureate at grade 5 or above, compared with 17% nationally. Owing to changes in the school league tables, it is not possible to compare this directly with cohorts before 2017; in 2013, 88% of pupils achieved five GCSEs at grade A*–C and 51% achieved that including English and Maths (key benchmarks at that time), the thirty-fourth highest percentage in the county (out of ninety-six).

Progress scores are also computed for A-Level students measuring their academic development between the end of Key Stage 4 and the completion of their A-Levels. In 2019, St George's received a progress score of -0.56 (confidence interval: -0.7 to -0.42), which was considered "well below average" and represented a fall from "below average" scores in 2018 and 2017. The average A-Level result was a C grade in 2019 (up from a C− in 2018), compared with a C+ grade nationally. The progress score for academic qualifications was "below average" in 2019 (-0.55) and the average grade a C; for applied general qualifications it was "average" (-0.15) and the average grade a Distinction-, higher than the national average of a Merit+. In technical qualifications, the Academy's average grade (Distinction+) was an entire grade above the national average; progress scores are not available. In 2013, the average point score per pupil was 660.4 and the average grade per entry was a D+. In that year, 50% of pupils had achieved at least three A-Levels at grades A*–E and 4% achieved at least three A-Levels at a minimum of AAB grades including at least two "facilitating subjects", though these measures are no longer included in school league tables.

Of pupils completing Key Stage 4 in 2017, 97% stayed in education or employment for at least two terms thereafter; this was slightly above the national figure (94%) and above St George's figures for 2013 leavers (90%) In the 2017 cohort, 89% stayed in education (52% at a school Sixth Form, 36% at further education colleges or institutions, and none at a Sixth Form college), slightly higher than the 2011 cohort (84%, with 45% carrying on to Sixth Form, 33% going into further education and 6% participating in an apprenticeship programme). Of year 13 leavers in 2018, 65% went into higher education, 5% in further education, 20% into employment and 10% into other activities; the figures in 2013 were 54%, 5%, 26% and 15% respectively.

=== Extracurricular activities ===
School clubs and societies include singing and drama clubs, chess club, sports clubs, film club and computer games club. A student council system is in place which acts as a forum between pupils and staff; elected representatives of each year group attend fortnightly, pupil-run meetings to discuss school policies with staff. On the Ruskington site, a pupil-run Interact Club, sponsored by the Rotary Club of Sleaford and Kesteven, coordinates charitable and community work in the school. The school newspaper club produces an annual newsletter and the school takes part in the BBC School Report day. Badminton, association football, volleyball, trampolining and gymnastics clubs are run every week at the Academy. The physical education department runs Inter-House sports competitions and co-ordinates school rugby, association football, basketball, boccia and netball teams. The music department hosts a junior and senior choir, swing band, Woodwind ensemble, Samba group and Vocal groups; the music rehearsal rooms can be booked for band practice. Pupils can audition for parts in the school's annual musical production and summer cabaret. For a fee, pupils may take up music lessons taught by tutors at the school. The school has supported music students in local and regional music festivals. A combined cadet force was established at the school in 2018.

== Sites and property ==
=== Church Lane, Sleaford (1908–1984) ===
The 1908 school house at Church Lane, Sleaford

The site at Church Lane was acquired at a cost of £900 in c. 1908; it was undeveloped when the previous Ordnance Survey map was completed in 1905. The schoolhouse was constructed to the plans of Mr Dunne of Lincoln by the contractors Messrs Wright and Son, also of Lincoln, who secured the contract for £7,442. The school building had entrances for girls and boys, who were taught separately in six classrooms; the assembly hall was 62 by 28 feet (18.9 by 8.5 m) with a domed ceiling. An infants' department consisted of three classrooms, while a workshop and kitchen were housed in separate buildings. In the late 1930s, the school premises were expanded, with a new Infants' School completed at the site in January 1939.

When teaching was transferred to the Westholme site in 1984, the original schoolhouse was demolished. The Infants' School buildings survived until the early 2000s, when they were also torn down to make way for the new buildings of its successor, Church Lane Primary School.

=== Westholme, Sleaford (c. 1947 – present) ===
==== Westholme House ====
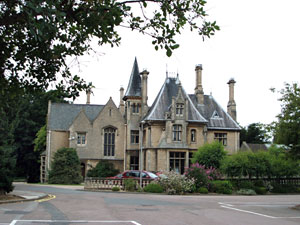
Westholme House, constructed c. 1849, originally a private residence, it became the Academy's administrative centre in 2012.

Westholme House was designed by Charles Kirk the Younger and built by his firm Kirk and Parry in c. 1849. The Gothic stone mansion, off Westgate, is situated in grounds spanning 32 acres (13 ha) (as of 2011). The Victorian buildings also include stables, which Sir Nikolaus Pevsner called "charming", and two Tudor-style lodges. Initially occupied by Kirk's business partner Thomas Parry, the businessman and Liberal politician Samuel Pattinson lived at the house from at least 1924 until his death in 1942. His wife, Betsy Sharpley Pattinson, died the same year and their trustees auctioned off the furniture at Westholme in 1944. During the Second World War, the grounds were occupied by the War Department, but by 1945 Kesteven County Council had acquired the land and planned to use it for educational purposes.

==== County Council acquisition and early development of the school: c. 1947 to 1961 ====
The County Council announced in May 1947 that the Infants' School would close and the former Senior School at Church Lane would be allocated £50,000 for adaptions as part of its conversion into a secondary modern for boys. The school would use parkland at Westholme for playing fields, where a separate secondary modern for girls would also be constructed and the girls' High School rebuilt. The new schools were not built but the parkland at Westholme was used as playing fields for students at the Secondary Modern in the late 1940s. By 1952, the school had acquired HORSA huts at Westholme and the site had its own senior schoolmistress. The accommodation was supplemented in 1953 with a metalwork room. Regarded as the "practical centre of the school", there were 624 pupils based at the Westholme site in 1954. Two years later, the school acquired the adjoining Westholme Lodge for use as a space for girls to practice domestic science, and in 1959 a sports pavilion opened on the site.

The 1961 school building at Westholme, demolished in 2011–12

In 1957, the Council proposed a new mixed secondary modern school building on the site and, in 1961, the first phase of a planned new school building was built on the site. This new building, which cost £51,000 to construct, included a 56 ft by 50 ft (17.1m by 15.2m) assembly hall with a stage, kitchens and 5 adjoining classrooms (including a rural science classroom with a greenhouse jutting out of the wall). This block was intended to be the first phase of a £244,000 building programme which would have enlarged the assembly hall and added a library, gymnasium and further classrooms, collectively capable of accommodating 750 pupils across five forms, facilitating the transfer of all students to the Westholme site and the closure of the temporary accommodation at Westholme. These plans were submitted to the Ministry of Education for the 1964–65 year, but central government funding was paused indefinitely and teaching continued to take place between the existing buildings at Westholme and those at the Church Lane premises. Outside school hours, the new building was used by other organisations, including the Sleaford Evening Institute (which held adult education classes there) and the Sleaford Little Theatre group (which put on performances on the stage).

==== Later developments: 1961 to present ====
A swimming pool (measuring 25 feet (7.6 m) by 45 feet (14 m) and 3 feet (0.91 m) deep) and adjoining changing rooms were opened in 1965, having been built by fourth-year boys under the supervision of their rural sciences, woodwork and metalwork tutors.

A new building at Westholme was constructed from 1981 to 1983 at the cost of £1 million. It included a gymnasium, changing facilities, and music, technology and domestic science classrooms. A civic centre opened in the main building with conference rooms and a bar which could be hired out. Run by a committee of Town Councillors, school governors and the headmaster, the centre could also let out the school hall and gymnasium to the public. A languages centre, partially funded by Reg Brealey, opened in 1985. Fitted with a satellite dish that could pick up signals from Russia, the centre housed a computer laboratory and classrooms; a local reporter described it as "probably the most advanced in the country" at the time its designs were released to the public. In 1994, science, technology and English buildings opened, followed by a library and art centre in 1999 (construction having started on the latter in 1997). A second sports hall was completed in 2001 and extended in 2003 to include ICT classrooms; science and construction buildings were completed in 2005, a childcare centre in 2008 (Note: Named the Thorold Centre in 2012 after Canon John Thorold, a former chairman of the governors) and an art building in 2009.

The school's conversion to an Academy included a £20 million grant, which funded renovations around the site, the demolition of the original school building and portable classrooms, and the construction of three new buildings: a science and IT building, an additional humanities block, and the Arnold Centre, (Note: Named for Graham Arnold, chairman of the Governors) the latter of which opened in 2012 to replace the 1961 building, and included a new hall, sixth form centre, library, drama studio and classrooms. A new classroom and workshop block for teaching construction courses opened in 2013. To accommodate a rising school-age population, the school asked in 2020 for permission from the local planning authority to construct five new classrooms and extend the existing music block with the addition of a new floor; in 2021, three existing ground floor music classrooms were refurbished and a two-storey extension was built with three first-floor classrooms and a purpose-built auditorium, alongside two additional ground floor classrooms.

In 2016, the Board of Governors announced plans for the construction of a swimming pool and fitness suite at a cost of £3.7 million to be paid for using the Academy's 'capital reserves'. At the time of announcement, it was hoped the buildings would be open in or before 2018, however the District Council refused planning permission in early 2019 on the grounds that it required community support for its viability, despite there already being "sufficient" facilities open to the public in the town.

=== Billingborough (2010–2012) ===
The Lord Lieutenant of Lincolnshire, the Earl of Ancaster, opened Billingborough County Secondary Modern School in 1963. On 11 acres (4.5 ha) of playing ground, including tennis courts, the steel-framed building was constructed by Messrs. Fosters of Grantham under the supervision of J. W. H. Barnes, county architect. It housed an assembly hall and dining space, gymnasium and three-storeys of classrooms alongside workshops for practical subjects. Following the closure of the Billingborough site, the buildings were demolished in 2014.

=== Ruskington (2010–present) ===
In 1947, Kesteven County Council outlined its 15-year plan for secondary education, which included the construction of a new secondary modern school at Ruskington. The buildings were completed in the 1950s and teaching commenced at Ruskington Secondary Modern School in 1956; the buildings were officially opened by Sir John Wolfenden, Vice-Chancellor of the University of Reading, the following year. Built on a 9-acre (3.6 ha) site at a cost of £100,658, the new school buildings consisted of a three-storeys of classrooms and a gymnasium, assembly/dining hall, library and greenhouse. The buildings were built around a prefabricated steel frame and modular concrete blocks clad in brick. Much of the site was devoted to playing fields, which were supplemented by eight grass tennis courts and playground.

These buildings were demolished in 2012 and work began on a new school as part of the Academy development plans. A hall and classrooms were completed in January 2015 as the first phase of the rebuilding; work on the second phase, including vocational classrooms and a technology suite, began two months later. With the second phase complete, the new campus buildings were officially opened on 6 November 2015. A workshop was added in 2020 for construction students.

== Headteachers ==
The first headmaster at Sleaford Council School was H. H. Godfrey, who had been schoolmaster at the Wesleyan school on Westgate since the 1890s. His successor at the Senior department, A. R. N. Rooksby, had taught in Grantham, a background not dissimilar to the third headmaster, F. A. Speechley. Appointed in 1973, John Hodgson was the first university-educated headteacher of the school. All four remained in the role for at least twenty years, with Hodgson being the longest serving at 25 years. Upon retirement, he was succeeded by Paul Watson, who had served at two Lincolnshire schools before his appointment; he formally used the title "principal" instead of headteacher. He was at St George's for 15 years until he retired and gave way to Wayne Birks, in 2014. Birks served for five academic years and retired in 2019; Laranya King, who had been a vice-principal at the school for seven years, succeeded him and became the school's first female principal.

Headteachers
Years	Name	Notes	Refs
1908–1931	Henry Hilton Godfrey	Born in 1870 in Luton, Bedfordshire, Godfrey was the son of Solomon, a hat manufacturer. Educated in Luton and at Westminster Training College, he was appointed master of the mixed Wesleyan School on Westgate in January 1891. He was a scoutmaster, a Methodist Circuit Secretary and Chairman of the Sleaford County Library Association. He died in 1956, aged 86. His sister Helen J. Godfrey (died 1942) was headmistress of the Infants' Department at the Wesleyan School from 1894 until its merger into the Council School in 1908, after which she was the Infants' Department's headmistress until retiring in 1923.	
1931–1952	Arthur Richard Newton Rooksby	Rooksby was the son of Richard Newton Rooksby, a schoolmaster, and his wife, Harriett Elizabeth née Hunter. Educated at Grantham, and the Training College at Peterborough, he served as a commissioned officer in the First World War. He was involved in the Commonwealth War Graves Commission and then taught at Peterborough and the Castlegate School in Grantham before his headship in Sleaford commenced. A keen gardener, he was a Fellow of the Royal Horticultural Society. He died at Grantham in 1975, aged 86.	
1952–1972	Frank Alfred Speechley	Educated at the King's School, Grantham, he trained as a teacher at Isleworth, and taught at Nottingham and Grantham before he was enlisted into the Royal Air Force during the Second World War. He became headmaster at the Grantham Technical Institute in 1946 and Huntingtower Road School in 1947, before his appointment at Sleaford. Appointed a Justice of the Peace in 1949, he served as Deputy Chairman of the Grantham Borough Magistrates; he was also elected to represent Grantham as a Conservative on Lincolnshire County Council in 1973, but retired in the 1977 elections. He stepped down from the bench in 1978, and died at Grantham in 1998, aged 90. (Note: His daughter Jill Speechley, a physiotherapist and former pupil at the Kesteven and Grantham High School, was appointed a Justice of the Peace on the Grantham Bench in 1978. She died in 2022, aged 89.)	
1973–1998	John Charles Hodgson	Born in Stockton-on-Tees, Hodgson was educated at Darlington and graduated from Durham University with a BA in Classics. He qualified as a teacher in 1957 and taught at Stockton Grammar School and the Fryerns Comprehensive School in Basildon; he became acting head at several schools in Huddersfield before taking up his post in Sleaford.	
1998–2014	Paul Frederick Watson	Educated at Nottingham and Leicester Universities, Watson then taught in Yorkshire and Lincolnshire. He helped to establish the Lincoln School of Science and Technology and was appointed its deputy headteacher in 1992, before he was seconded to Middlefield School of Technology in Gainsborough as acting deputy headteacher; he eventually became the school's head.	
2014–2019	Wayne Russell William Birks	Birks was appointed headteacher at Ramsey Abbey School in 2001 and remained in that role until it merged with Ailwyn School in 2006; he then served as headteacher of the new school, Abbey College, until joining St George's. He announced publicly in November 2018 that he would be retiring at the end of the 2018–19 academic year, and retired in August 2019.	
2019–2024	Laranya King (formerly Caslin)	King was born and raised in Lincolnshire. She began teaching in 1994 and worked at three schools before she joined St George's Academy in 2012 as a vice-principal and head of the sixth form. She succeeded Birks in September 2019 as Principal. Prior to arriving at the Academy, King had been a deputy principal at Sawtry Community College. She retired in 2024.	
2024–present	Amanda Elaine Money	Raised in Lincolnshire, Money first worked for St George's Academy's predecessor in 2004 as head of mathematics. She subsequently spent time working on secondary education provision across Lincolnshire, before returning to the Academy in 2012. She was appointed a vice-principal in the 2014–15 academic year, and in 2023 became head of school for the Ruskington campus. She was appointed interim principal following King's retirement in 2024; her appointment was made permanent in February 2025.	

== Notable former pupils ==
- Air Vice-Marshal Michael Smeath CBE, Commandant-General of the RAF Regiment since May 2022
