= Jean Jeavons =

English swimmer (born 1956)

Personal information
- Full name: Jean Anne Jeavons
- National team: United Kingdom
- Born: 22 May 1956 (age 70)
- Height: 1.67 m (5 ft 6 in)
- Weight: 57 kg (126 lb; 9.0 st)

Sport
- Sport: Swimming
- Strokes: Butterfly
- Club: Sudbury District Swimming Club

Jean Anne Jeavons (born 22 May 1956) is a female English former competition swimmer.

== Early life ==
She swam in the Grantham swimming gala, and lived in Gunby, South Kesteven in 1969, by 1969 she was winning national championships. She attended the Charles Read School. She could not compete for Leicestershire as she lived in Gunby, so by early 1970 her family moved to Buckminster in Leicestershire. By 1970 she attended Melton Upper School.

She trained at pools in Melton (mostly) and Grantham and Leicester. In early 1972, Melton pool closed for repairs, so most training was at Grantham, four mornings a week; other pools had closed for power cuts. Buckminster wanted to raise £500 for her expenses. By July 1972 Buckminster and Sewstern had raised £700. Buckminster Trust Estate gave the fund £100. In July 1972 she was selected for Olympics, under coach Hammie Bland.

== Swimming career ==
Jeavons swam the Butterfly Stroke for Great Britain and the Melton Mowbray Swimming Club where she became the county champion and broke the county record which remains to this day.

She represented Great Britain at the 1972 Summer Olympics in Munich competing in the women's 100- and 200-metre butterfly, and 4×100-metre medley relay, and came 20th, 9th, and 10th, respectively, missing out on a place in the 200-metre final by a single place and less than a second. On 4 September 1972, she took part in the 4 x 100 relay with Pamela Bairstow, Dorothy Harrison and Lesley Allardice who set a British record, but never reached the final.

She represented England in the 100 and 200 metres butterfly events, at the 1974 British Commonwealth Games in Christchurch, New Zealand. At the ASA National British Championships she won the 100 metres butterfly title in 1971 and 1972 and the 200 metres butterfly title in 1972 and 1973.

== Personal life ==
She now lives in Dedham, Essex.

== See also ==
- Sport in Leicester
