= Listed buildings in Anwick =

Anwick is a small village and civil parish in the North Kesteven district of Lincolnshire, England; the civil parish had a population of 392 in 2011. There are 5 listed buildings in the civil parish. One of the buildings is classified by Historic England as being in Grade I and the remainder in Grade II.

In the United Kingdom, the term "listed building" refers to a building or other structure officially designated as being of special architectural, historical or cultural significance. These buildings are in three grades: Grade I consists of buildings of outstanding architectural or historical interest; Grade II* includes particularly significant buildings of more than local interest; Grade II consists of buildings of special architectural or historical interest. Buildings in England are listed by the Secretary of State for Culture, Media and Sport on recommendations provided by Historic England, which also determines the grading.

== Key ==
Grade	Criteria
I	Buildings of exceptional interest, sometimes considered to be internationally important
II*	Particularly important buildings of more than special interest
II	Buildings of national importance and special interest

== Listed buildings ==
Listed buildings in Sleaford
Name	Location	Image	Grade	Date	Description	Ref.
Church of St Edith	Church Lane; TF 11451 50634		I	13th and 14th century, and Victorian and Edwardian alterations	Made of limestone with slate and lead roofing, St Edith's Church has a west tower with a stone spire housing three tiers of lucarne windows. The north aisle dates to the 14th century and houses reticulated windows and a late 13th-century doorway. The south aisle is similar to the north but restored in 1915. The nave was re-roofed in 1916; the nave itself incorporates 13th-century arcading to the north and similar arcading to the south; there is also a 14th-century tower arch. The chancel incorporates 14th-century windows. The church was restored in 1859 and the chancel in 1900; the spire was repaired in 1906 following a lightning strike.	
Base of Churchyard Cross, South of Church of St Edith	Church Lane; TF 11454 50630		II	14th century	A limestone ashlar cross base dating from the 14th century. Located in the churchyard.	
Old Manor Farm	Church Lane; TF 11093 50410		II	16th century, with elements dated to 1639; altered in the mid 18th and 20th centuries.	A two-storey former farm building built of stone (ashlar on the ground level, rubble with quoins on the upper floor) with a pantile roof. The listing includes a "fine" fire surround, 18th-century wooden interior doors, and a datestone of 1639.	
The County Forge	Main Street; TF 11476 50480		II	Early 19th century	A house, forge and shoeing bay all of a single story and made of whitewashed red brick to a Gothic style. It has two circular elements connected by a rectangular wing.	
The Round House	Main Street; TF 11093 50410		II	Early 19th century	A single-storey whitewashed circular brick lodge, the front incorporating Tudor-arched doorways (one blocked) and a veranda supported by wooden pillars. The roof is thatched.	
