= Charles Read Academy =

Coordinates: 52°48′38″N 0°30′59″W

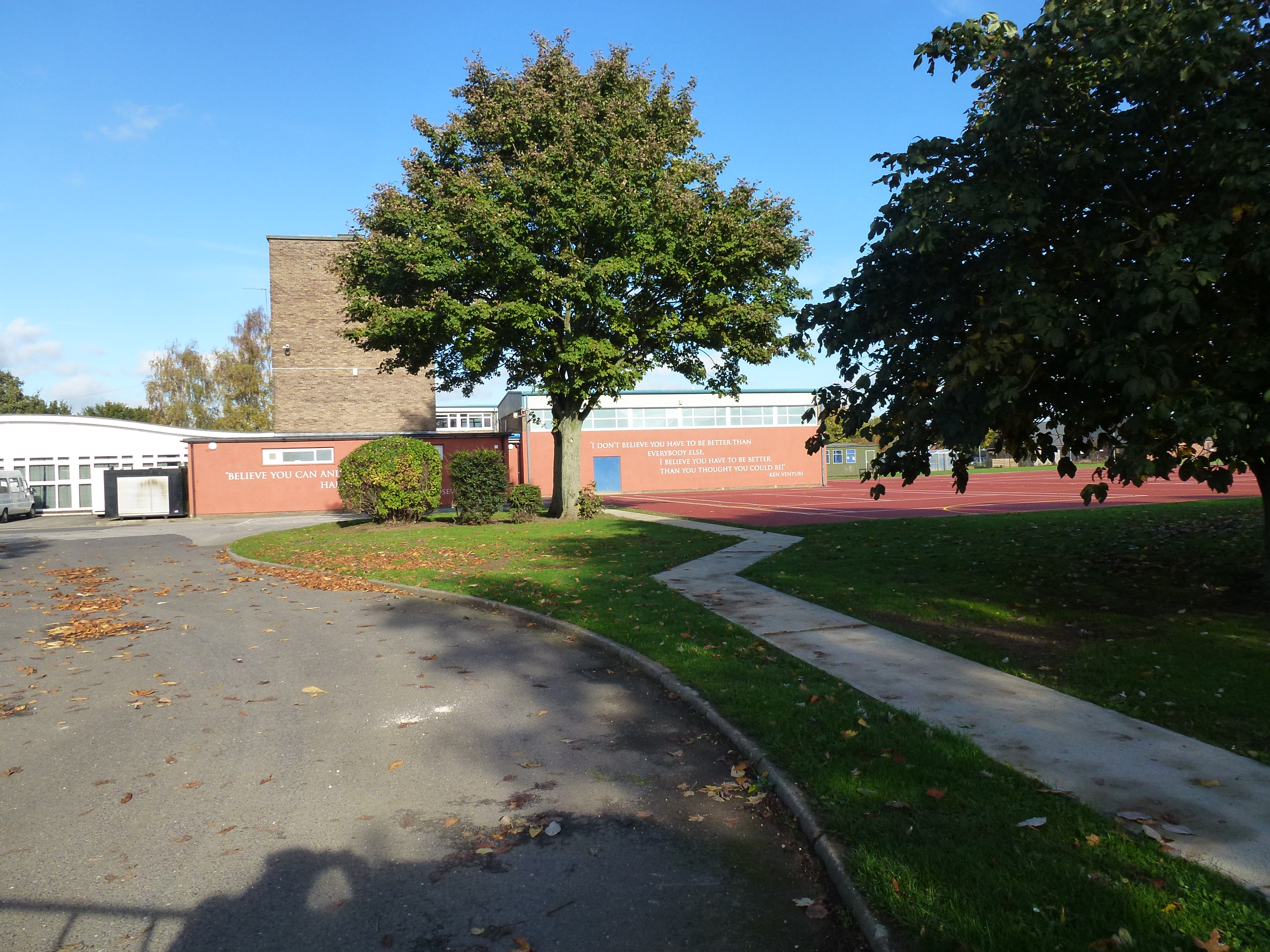

Location
- Bourne Road; Corby Glen, Lincolnshire, NG33 4NT; England

Information
- Type: Academy
- Established: 23 April 1963
- Local authority: Lincolnshire
- Trust: David Ross Education Trust
- Department for Education URN: 136479 Tables
- Ofsted: Reports
- Principal: Sue Jones
- Gender: Co-educational
- Age: 11 to 16
- Website: www.charlesreadacademy.co.uk

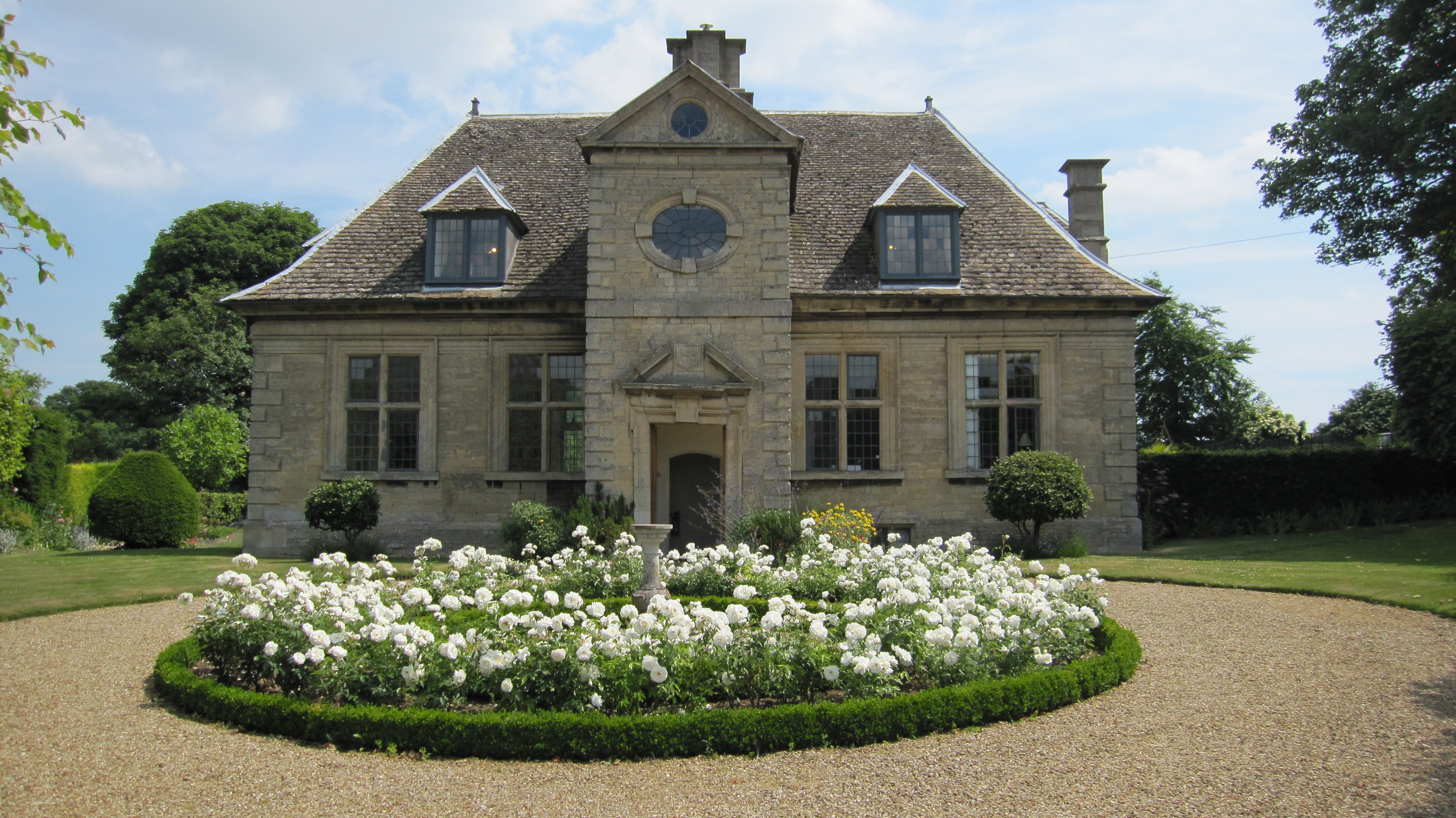
The original Charles Read grammar school; now a gallery and library

Charles Read Academy is a co-educational secondary school located in Corby Glen, Lincolnshire, England. It serves the villages between Stamford, Bourne and Grantham.

== History ==
The current school was built as a secondary modern in 1963. The school name was chosen in April 1963. The wide catchment area was from Stainby across to Braceby. There were 11 acres of playing fields. It was the last secondary school to be built in Kesteven.

The school opened on Tuesday 23 April 1963, costing £117,000. It had 94 children aged 11 to 14. The headmaster was Mr Tom Longfellow Hoggart (19 April 1917 – 1990) from Greenwood Bilateral School in Nottingham, who lived at 39 North Road in Bourne. The deputy head was Mr G. R. Moore from Lytchett Minster County Secondary School in Poole in Dorset. Miss J. L. F. Palmer (later Mrs Garner) was from Sleaford High School, Miss J. Allison was from Sycamore Secondary Girls School (closed in 1967, to form the Elliot Durham School) in Nottingham and Mr P. H. Hering was from the Gleed School in Spalding.

On the evening of Friday 8 November 1963 the official opening was by Sir Neville Faulks, father of author Sebastian Faulks, with the Bishop of Lincoln, Kenneth Riches, the chairman of Kesteven Council, and the Conservative Rutland and Stamford MP Kenneth Lewis.

The original grammar school building is now the Willoughby Memorial Library and Art Gallery. The building was restored in 1965 by the Willoughby Memorial Trust which was founded by James Heathcote-Drummond-Willoughby, 3rd Earl of Ancaster in memory of his son Timothy, Lord Willoughby de Eresby, who died in 1963.

In the speech day of October 1964, the headmaster of Harrow School, Robert James, presented the prizes. He was a friend of the chairman of Kesteven Council, who was also the chairman of the school governors. The director of education of Kesteven also attended. There were 10 staff and 190 children. From 1969 some children would be allowed to take O-levels.

On Monday 5 April 1971, the body of the 41 year old wife of the 54 year old headmaster was found on the East Coast Main Line at Swayfield. The brother of Mr Hoggart was Prof Richard Hoggart, of the University of Birmingham. His wife had depression for eight years, and had been under hospital treatment. Her body was found by Police Constable Hubert Johns of Bourne. The driver of a King's Cross to Newcastle train had reported hitting a woman at around 12.15 pm. Mr Hoggart remarried in Grantham in 1976.

In January 1980 Lincolnshire County Council looked at closing the school, but chose not to in November 1980. On Tuesday 3 February 1981, Seventh Day Adventists Don and Ann Lale were murdered in Nyazura in Zimbabwe. 49 year old Don Lale had taught English, French and History at the school in the early 1970s. Both were English teachers, who had met at Stoke Rochford College in the late 1960s. Their sons, aged 14 and 16, were at the Seventh Day Adventist Stanborough School, Watford. Grantham had the company Stanborough Press, which was the main publishing company of the Seventh-day Adventist Church. Tom Hoggart retired at the end of March 1982. The chairman of the governors was Jane Heathcote-Drummond-Willoughby, 28th Baroness Willoughby de Eresby, the granddaughter of Nancy Astor, Viscountess Astor. Tom Hoggart died aged 73, in Grantham, on 23 April 1990. His second wife was the director of Grantham Samaritans.

In 1999 it was renamed the Charles Read High School to perpetuate the tradition of the former grammar school founded in 1669 by the bequest of Charles Read (1604–1669), who became a wealthy shipper in Hull. Read also founded Read School at Drax in Yorkshire and a grammar school at Tuxford in Nottinghamshire. Reads Grammar School in Corby Glen closed in 1909.

=== Academy ===
Charles Read High School converted to an academy in January 2011. In January 2013 the West Grantham Academies Trust announced the Academy would close by September 2014 but subsequently the David Ross Education Trust took responsibility for maintaining the school.

== Notable former pupils ==
- Beverley Allitt – Serial killer nurse.
- Jean Jeavons, Olympic swimmer at the 1972 Olympics, swam in the heats of the 100m and 200m butterfly, and the 4 × 100m medley relay

== See also ==
- The Aveland High School, built at the same time, to the same design, officially opened in May 1963, with The Lafford High School (which opened on the same day in April 1963), all three were known as the 'BBC Project' by Kesteven Council
