= William Willymat =

Church of England clergyman and author

The Reverend William Willymat
- Rector of Ruskington
- Province: Canterbury
- Diocese: Lincoln
- Appointed: 1585

William Willymat (died 1615) was a Church of England clergyman and author.

== Life ==
William Willymat was probably a native of Cheshire. In 1585 he was presented to the rectory of Ruskington in Lincolnshire by Thomas Howard (afterwards Earl of Suffolk). In 1603, with the King's consent, he published a volume of extracts from James I's Basilikon Doron, which he rendered into Latin and English verse and entitled A Prince's Looking-Glasse, or a Prince's Direction, very requisite and necessarie for a Christian Prince. … Printed by Iohn Legat, Cambridge, 4to. The work was dedicated to Henry, Prince of Wales, for whose benefit the Basilikon Doron had been written. Encouraged by the favourable reception of his compilation, he published a companion volume in 1604 entitled A Loyal Svbiect's Looking-Glasse, or a Good Subiect's Direction necessary and requisite for euery Good Christian … at London, printed by G. Elde for Robert Boulton, 4to. This work was also dedicated to Prince Henry. Willymat enforced by precepts drawn from ancient and modern writers the subject's duty of obedience to his rulers. He devoted a large portion of his book to rebuking reluctance in paying subsidies and customs, asserting that the subject's only lawful remedy lay in "the compassion, pity, and bountifulnesse of the king, prince, &c., in pardoning and remitting the same". In 1605 he published a third treatise of a religious nature, which shows literary ability of a high order. It was entitled Physicke to cure the most Dangerous Disease of Desperation … by W. W. … at London, printed for Robert Boulton (8vo), and dedicated to his patron, the Earl of Suffolk. A second edition was published in 1607.

On 15 July 1612 Willymat petitioned the King concerning the arrears of a yearly payment of 2l. to be made to the Crown from the revenues of his rectory, which had remained unpaid for forty-seven years. He requested the remission of the arrears due before the commencement of James I's reign, offering to make good subsequent arrears. His petition was granted. Willymat died at Ruskington at the close of 1615, and his will was proved at Lincoln on 19 January 1615–16. By his wife Margaret he had two sons, William and James, and four daughters: Sarah, Margaret, Frances, and Anne. He possessed land in Cheshire, which he bequeathed to his brothers, James and Roger; in Ruskington, which he left to his son William; and in Bicker, which he bestowed on his son James. The rest of his possessions he gave to his wife and three younger daughters, the eldest, Sarah, probably being married. Copies of all his works are in the British Library.

== Bibliography ==
- Carlyle, Edward Irving (1900). "Willymat, William" . In Lee, Sidney (ed.). Dictionary of National Biography. Vol. 62. London: Smith, Elder & Co. pp. 58–59.
