= South Kyme =

Village in Lincolnshire, England

Coordinates: 53.032120°N 0.2489°W

- Location within Lincolnshire
- Population: 393 (2011)
- OS grid reference: TF175497
  - London: 110 mi (180 km) S
- District: North Kesteven
- Shire county: Lincolnshire
- Region: East Midlands
- Country: England
- Sovereign state: United Kingdom
- Post town: Lincoln
- Postcode district: LN4
- Police: Lincolnshire
- Fire: Lincolnshire
- Ambulance: East Midlands
- UK Parliament: Sleaford and North Hykeham

South Kyme is a small village and civil parish in the North Kesteven district of Lincolnshire, England. The population of the civil parish at the 2011 census was 393. It is located 2.5 miles (4 km) south-east from North Kyme which is itself 2.5 miles (4 km) from Billinghay.

South Kyme contains a public house, The Hume Arms, and a golf club. The River Slea, which is called the 'Kyme Eau' from Ferry Farm a mile or so to the north of South Kyme, runs parallel to the main road, passing under three bridges, and eventually flowing into the River Witham at Chapel Hill. The river was once navigable by the Sleaford Navigation from the Witham to the market town of Sleaford.

The South Kyme emblem is a Kingfisher, modelled as a wooden sculpture by Simon Todd.

== Landmarks ==
=== Kyme Priory ===
The church is dedicated to Saint Mary and All Saints and is a Grade II* listed building which dates from at least 1196 as the former Augustinian Kyme Priory. The church today consists of the south aisle and part of the nave of the former priory.

=== Kyme Tower ===
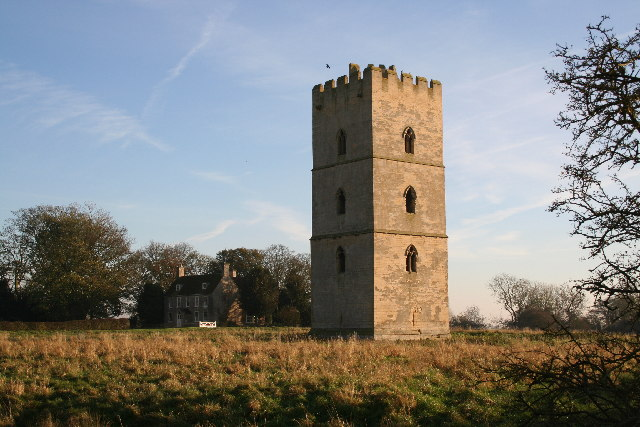
Kyme Tower

On a site to the west of the village stands the Grade I listed Kyme Tower for which the village is best known. This was a mediaeval castle which is believed to have been built between 1339 and 1381 by Gilbert de Umfraville third Earl of Angus and Lord of Kyme. Most of the building was demolished around 1720–1725 leaving only the single ashlar (stone block) tower.
