= Walcott, Lincolnshire =

Village in Lincolnshire, England

Coordinates: 53.0947°N 0.3130°W

Walcott
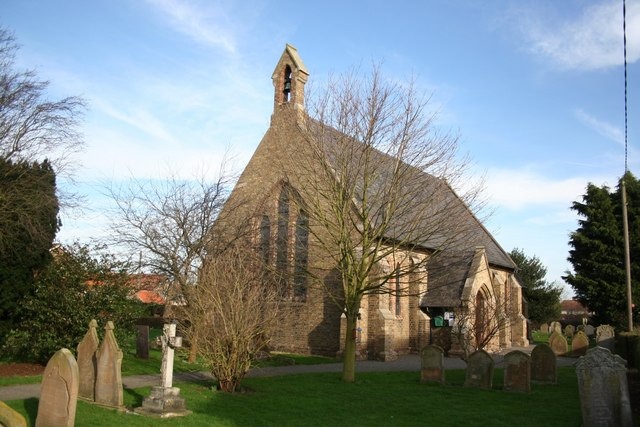
- St Oswald's Church, Walcott

- Location within Lincolnshire
- Population: 566 (2011)
- OS grid reference: TF130566
  - London: 110 mi (180 km) S
- District: North Kesteven
- Shire county: Lincolnshire
- Region: East Midlands
- Country: England
- Sovereign state: United Kingdom
- Post town: Lincoln
- Postcode district: LN4
- Police: Lincolnshire
- Fire: Lincolnshire
- Ambulance: East Midlands
- UK Parliament: Sleaford and North Hykeham (UK Parliament constituency)

Walcott is a small village and civil parish in the North Kesteven district of Lincolnshire, England. The population of the civil parish at the 2011 census was 566. It is situated approximately 2 miles (3 km) north from Billinghay and 7 miles (11 km) north-east from the town of Sleaford.

== History ==
According to A Dictionary of British Place Names, Walcott is derived from the Old English 'walh' with 'cot', which means "cottage(s) of the Britons".

In the Domesday Book account the settlement is written as "Walecote", and was in the Langoe Hundred of Kesteven. In 1086 Walcott contained twenty-five households, seven freemen and two smallholders, land for four plough teams, and a 10 acres (40,000 m^{2}) meadow. In 1066 lordship of the manor was held by Hemming of Branston, this transferred to Walter D'Aincourt in 1086, who was also Tenant-in-chief to William I.

The Gilbertine Catley Priory of St Mary was founded between 1146 and 1154; and dissolved in 1538. No sign of the priory can now be seen, but the site is scheduled.

Walcott is recorded in the 1872 White's Directory as a hamlet of Billinghay parish, part the Langoe wapentake, and near the Car Dyke navigation. The hamlet had a population of 609 within a land area of 3,247 acres (13 km^{2}) which stretched eastwards to the River Witham. The fenland between the hamlet and the Witham had been enclosed in 1799 and was "well drained and cultivated". The land was in the possession of various local families, but had been, between 1780 and 1787, held by William Fitzwilliam, 4th Earl Fitzwilliam. At the enclosure, the tithes - typically one-tenth of the produce or profits of the land given to the rector for his services - were commuted to an allotment of 143 acres (0.6 km^{2}) to support the ecclesiastical parish vicar. An "ancient" St Oswald's chapel of ease began decaying in 1776, and was replaced in 1852 by a new chapel, built by subscription in Early English style, the curacy of which was attached to Billinghay vicarage. A Wesleyan chapel had been built in 1820.

Two "ancient" trees, one of 4,000 feet (1,200 m) of wood, were dug up at Walcott Dales (near the River Witham), in 1811; an axe was also discovered, by which one of the trees was "supposed to have been felled". In 1817 "several" tumuli were found, one of them containing coffins and human bones. About half a mile west of the hamlet was reported the former Catley Priory, founded by Peter de Billinghay during the 12th-century reign of King Stephen for nuns and brethren of the Gilbertine Order, and which at the 16th-century Suppression of the Monasteries was given to Robert Carre of Sleaford. The priory stood on 40 acres (0.16 km^{2}) of ground, which, when investigated in 1791, revealed "several" gravestones, human bones and pieces of painted glass.

Trades listed at Walcott in 1872 included two shoemakers, two joiners, one of whom was also a wheelwright, a blacksmith, and a cattle salesman. There were thirty-six farmers, one of whom was also a grocer, draper & baker, another also a draper, one running a beerhouse, one a butcher, and one also the licensed victualler of the Black Horse public house. There were two beerhouse licensees, one of whom was also a carrier; he and a further carrier—transporter by wagon of goods and occasionally people between centres of trade—operated between the village and both Sleaford and Lincoln.

=== 1982 Phantom crash ===
RAF Phantom 'XT912', of 64 Squadron, crashed on the morning of Wednesday 14 April 1982. The aircraft had collided with the underside of Phantom 'XT903'. The B1189 to Timberland was closed. The air crew were Sqn Ldr Guy Dennis Slocum, aged 35, originally from Liss, Hampshire and Flt Lt Dick George, aged 34. Both air crew parachuted near The Lafford High School, and were taken to RAF Hospital Nocton Hall.

== Community ==
The parish church is a Grade II listed building of red brick dedicated to Saint Oswald and built in 1852. It was presumably named after a previous chapel at Walcott, dedicated to Saint Oswald, and given by King John to Spalding Priory. The previous chapel stood in the centre of the village and was pulled down around 1790

As at 2010, Walcott has one public house, The Plough, and a primary school; the school caters for Walcott children and has study links with Martin village primary school 3 miles (5 km) away.

The countryside around Walcott is of agricultural use, with sheep farming and the growing of potatoes being prominent.
