= Sport in Leicester =

Sport in Leicester, United Kingdom includes a variety of professional and amateur sports.

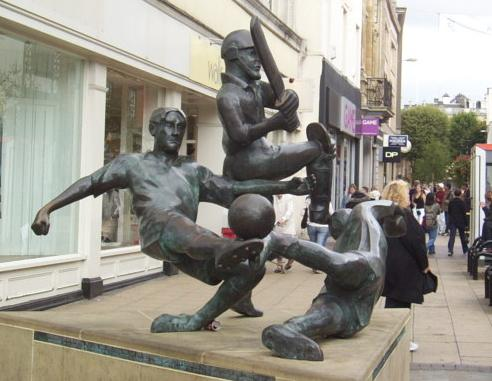
The Sporting Success Statue on Gallowtree Gate

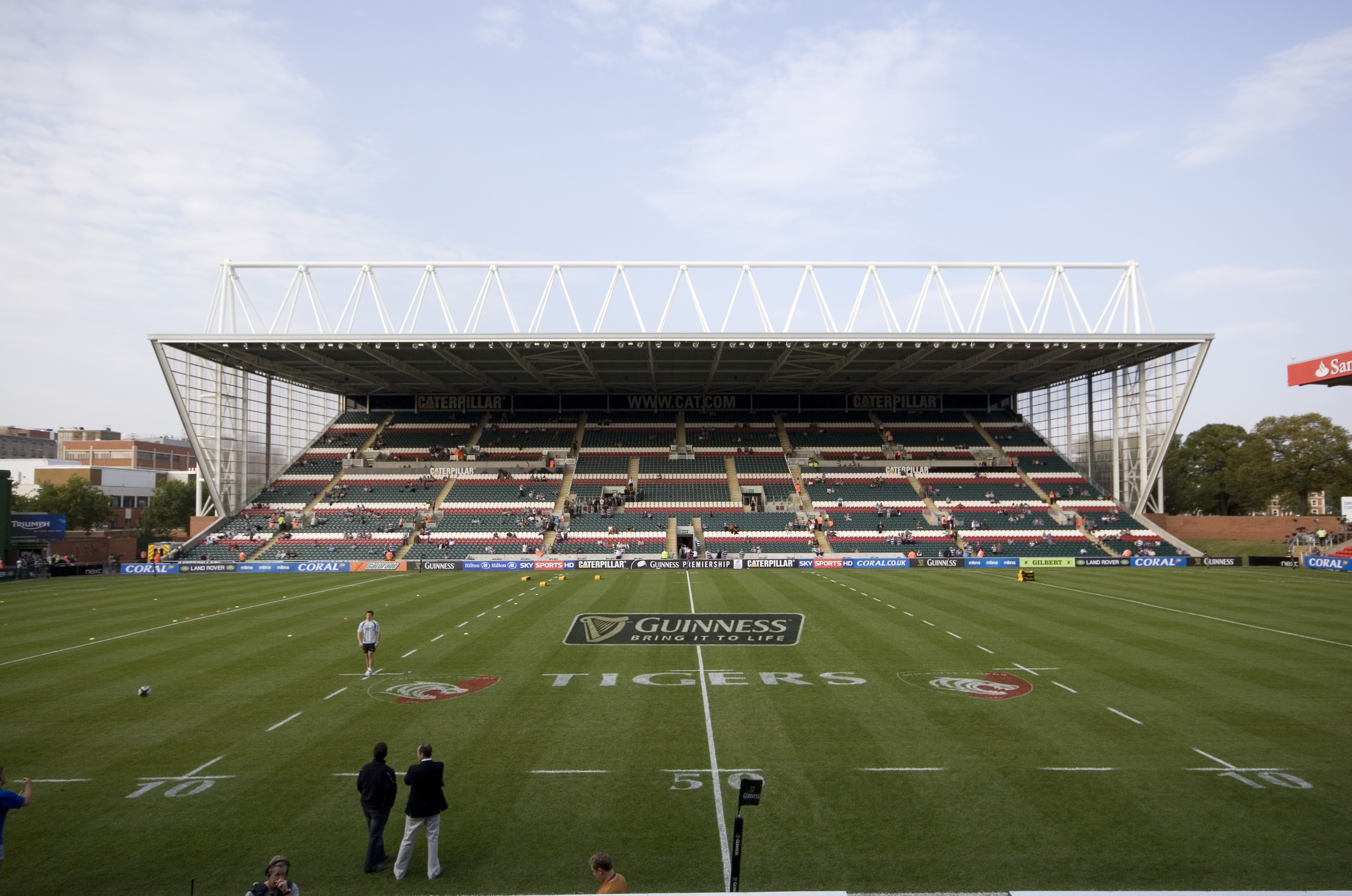
The Caterpillar stand at Welford Road Stadium

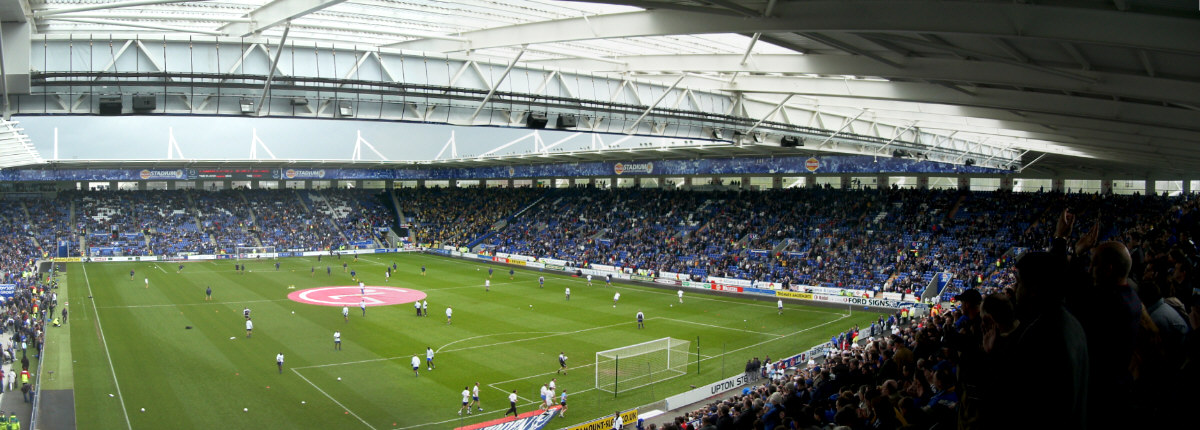
King Power Stadium, home of Leicester City F.C.

The city of Leicester has a successful record in sport. In 2016, it was named the UK's Greatest Sporting City, and in 2008, it was named as a European City of Sport.

Professional and semi professional sports teams include: Leicester Tigers (rugby union), Leicester City (football), Leicester Riders (basketball), Leicester Warriors (basketball), Leicester Lions (speedway), and the Leicestershire County Cricket Club.

Sports clubs include: Leicester Coritanian A.C. (athletics) and Leicester Penguins Swimming Club who were awarded Sports Club of the Year by the Leicester Mercury at their annual sports awards for 2007 and 2008.

Leicester Racecourse is located to the south of the city in Oadby.

A statue was erected in the town centre commemorating Sporting Success in the year 1996 when Leicester City won the Football League Cup, Leicester Tigers won the Pilkington Cup, and Leicestershire won the County Championship.

== Rugby union ==
Leicester Tigers on Welford Road are one of the most successful Rugby Union teams in Europe, having won the European Cup twice, the first tier of English rugby ten times, and the Anglo-Welsh Cup eight times. Notable former players include England's Rugby World Cup winning captain Martin Johnson, Neil Back, Dean Richards and Austin Healey.

== Football ==
Leicester City have won every major honour in English football, one of only five clubs to do so this century. In 2016, they famously became the sixth team to win the Premier League. They have competed in the top flight regularly during their history, won three League Cups and reached the FA Cup Final five times, lifting the trophy for the first time in 2021. The club have also competed in seven European campaigns to date, notably reaching the UEFA Champions League quarter-finals in 2016-17 and UEFA Conference League semi-finals in 2021-22. They have championed the second tier of English football on a record eight occasions, most recently in 2023-24. In the 2008–09 season, they competed in and won League One, the only time they have played in the third tier of the English football league system.

The club's current stadium is the King Power Stadium (formerly the Walkers Stadium), situated south of the city centre and near to the site of Filbert Street from which they relocated in 2002 after 111 years. Notable former managers include Jimmy Bloomfield, Matt Gillies, Martin O'Neill, Nigel Pearson, Claudio Ranieri, and Brendan Rodgers. Notable former players include Gordon Banks (England's World Cup winning goalkeeper in 1966), Peter Shilton, Frank Worthington, Gary Lineker (the third highest goalscorer of all time for the England team with 48 goals between 1984 and 1992), Alan Smith, Emile Heskey, Neil Lennon, Simon Grayson, Andy King, Kasper Schmeichel, Danny Simpson, Wes Morgan, Robert Huth, Christian Fuchs, Riyad Mahrez, Danny Drinkwater, N'Golo Kanté, Marc Albrighton, Shinji Okazaki, Harry Maguire, James Maddison, and Youri Tielemans. Notable current players include Jamie Vardy, Wilfred Ndidi, and Ricardo Pereira.

Formed in 2004 as an independent club, Leicester City Women became fully professional in 2020 and were acquired by King Power, the parent company of men's affiliate Leicester City FC. They primarily play home fixtures at the King Power Stadium, and currently boast "one of the most impressive women’s-only facilities in English football.

== Motor sports ==
Motorcycle speedway racing has been staged in Leicester since 1928. In the pioneer days speedway was staged at a track known as Leicester Super situated in Melton Road and at 'The Stadium' in Blackbird Road. Post war, the Leicester Hunters joined the National League Division Three in 1949 and operated at various levels until closure at the end of 1962. The sport was revived for a spell from 1968 before the sale and subsequent redevelopment of the site ended the first Leicester Lions era in 1983. Planning permission was granted in October 2009 for a brand-new speedway track at Beaumont Park, with Leicester Lions returning to action in the Premier League from 2011 to 2013. In 2019 the Lions won the Championship and also the KO Cup. In 2024 they race in the top division of British Speedway the Premiership.

== American football ==
Leicester is home to the Leicester Falcons, an American football team that competes as part of the BAFA National Leagues and in 2011 was promoted to the BAFA Premier League, the highest tier of British American Football. The Falcons' home ground is located at Babington Academy, in the Beaumont Leys area of the city.

== Rugby league ==
Leicester Phoenix is a rugby league club based in the centre of the city. The club was founded in 1986. After playing in different British Amateur Rugby League Association leagues (namely the Midlands and South West Amateur Rugby League and the East Midlands Amateur Rugby League) the Phoenix were one of the 10 founder members of the Rugby League Conference (then the Southern Conference League) in 1997 reaching the grand final in the inaugural season. Since then they have been one of the league's most consistent performers. Their 1st Grade Team currently compete in the Midlands Premier division of the Rugby League Conference.

== Other sports ==
Leicester City Hockey Club are one of England's leading ladies clubs. Their Ladies side has won the England Hockey League on six occasions, the most recent success coming in 2012. They have also won the Women's national Cup four times and have seen a number of players selected for International representation, notably 2016 Olympic gold medalist Crista Cullen. They are based at Leicester Grammar School in Great Glen.

Leicester Rowing Club is a rowing and sculling club based in the centre of the city on the River Soar. Formed in 1882 they represent Leicester in Regatta and Head Races around Great Britain and Worldwide. The club insignia is based on the mythical Wyvern and rowers compete in the club's colours of black and white.

Leicester also has many badminton clubs in the city; most notably Leicester University, Loughborough Students, Regal Arts and Birstall.

The city also hosted British and World track cycling and Road Racing championships at its Saffron Lane velodrome and Mallory Park racing circuit in August 1970. The cycle track was improved specially for the event which was televised all over the world. Another first meant that sponsors were allowed to buy sections of the track to utilise for advertising purposes. This was also the first time that a public road – the A46 – was closed in the UK to allow the Road Race to take place. However, this was the second world championships to be hosted by the city. Leicester is also the home of Leicestershire Road Club, the oldest cycling club in the county. Notable riders from Leicester include Individual Pursuit World Champion Colin Sturgess, double World Junior Road Race Champion Lucy Garner, Commonwealth Games silver medallist George Atkins, and Daniel McLay, who in 2016 became the first rider from Leicestershire to compete in the Tour de France.

In 1989 and 2009, the city hosted the British Special Olympics. This was the adopted charity for the Lord Mayor of Leicester 2008–2009, Councillor Manjula Sood.

Until its demolition in 1999, Granby Halls was a popular live music, exhibition and sports arena in the city. It was also notable as the long serving home of professional basketball team, the Leicester Riders, from 1980 until 1999.

The Dolly Rockit Rollers roller derby league are based in Leicester. They were ranked amongst the top eight UKRDA members for 2011, and played at the Association's 2012 championship tournament as a result.

Leicester City Korfball Club is based out of Regent College and DMU Korfball Club based at the university.

Leicester Blue Sox is a baseball club based in the city, they play their home games at Western Park. They currently compete in the BBF single-A central division.

Leicester was also the '2008 European City of Sport'.
