= Billingborough =

Village and civil parish in Lincolnshire, England

Coordinates: 52.893649°N 0.340233°W

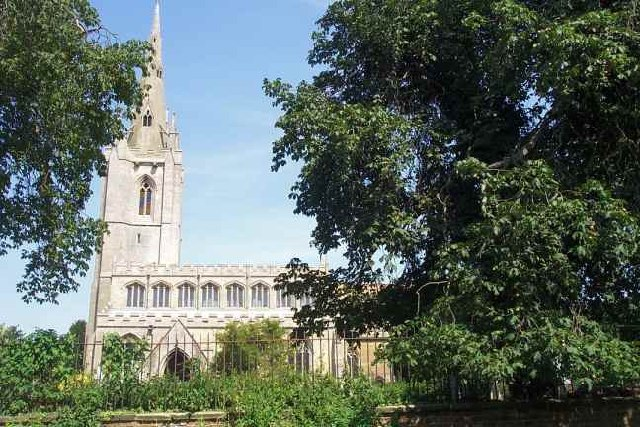
- Church of St Andrew, Billingborough

- Location within Lincolnshire
- Population: 1,401 (Including Birthorpe. 2011 census)
- OS grid reference: TF116342
  - London: 95 mi (153 km) S
- Civil parish: Billingborough
- District: South Kesteven
- Shire county: Lincolnshire
- Region: East Midlands
- Country: England
- Sovereign state: United Kingdom
- Post town: SLEAFORD
- Postcode district: NG34
- Dialling code: 01529
- Police: Lincolnshire
- Fire: Lincolnshire
- Ambulance: East Midlands
- UK Parliament: Grantham and Bourne

Billingborough is a village and civil parish in the South Kesteven district of Lincolnshire, England. It is situated approximately 10 miles (16 km) north of Bourne and 10 miles south of Sleaford, and on the B1177 between Horbling and Pointon just south of the A52.

== History ==
The village is named after the post-Roman Billings tribe of invaders. The village was formerly served by the Billingborough and Horbling railway station on the Bourne and Sleaford Railway, giving the village connections to nearby Bourne and Sleaford. The former high school name, Aveland, is taken from a pre-Norman Conquest wapentake of that name, dating to 921. The wapentake extended from Bourne to Threekingham. The area was populous in the Middle Ages, and included the lost village of Ouseby as well as the shrunken village of Birthorpe. St Andrew's Church dates to the 13th century and is in a mixture of Perpendicular Gothic and Decorated styles.

On a Saturday in 1791 a six-hour football match between the 'bachelors' of Osbournby and Billingborough was played at Osbournby field. Billingborough won and were distinguished by the wearing of blue ribbons.

== Community ==
Billingborough is positioned at the edge of The Fens. According to the 2001 census, it had a population of 1,098 in 461 households. By 2011 both figures had risen, to 1,401.

The village has a single primary school. There formerly existed a secondary modern school, The Aveland High School, which opened in 1963 but closed in January 2010 to merge with a Sleaford school to form St George's Academy. The high school was later demolished and the site redeveloped for housing.

The parish church is dedicated to St Andrew. Under the Diocese of Lincoln, the ecclesiastical parish is part of The Billingborough Group in the Lafford Deanery. As of 2014, the priest-in-charge is Rev Rebecca Rock.

Billingborough has a small number of shops on High Street as well as a public house called the "Fortescue Arms". There is also an Army Cadet Force detachment next to the St George's Academy site. It is part of the Lincolnshire Army Cadet Force and wears the cap badge of the Royal Engineers. The village Billingborough Horbling and Threekingham Cricket Club gained entry into the ECB Lincs Premier League in 2013.

== Notable people ==
- Richard Nauyokas, of Lads Army lived in the village
- Eric Houghton, Aston Villa and England footballer and Villa manager, was born in the village.
- Robert Gordon Latham, ethnologist and philologist was born in Billingborough in 1812
