= Dorrington, Lincolnshire =

Village and civil parish in the North Kesteven district of Lincolnshire, England

Coordinates: 53.062°N 0.389°W

Dorrington
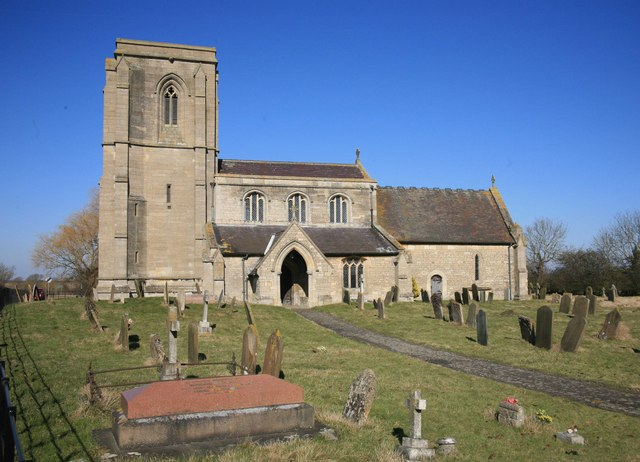
- Church of SS James and John, Dorrington

- Location within Lincolnshire
- Population: 344 (2011)
- OS grid reference: TF080529
  - London: 110 mi (180 km) S
- District: North Kesteven
- Shire county: Lincolnshire
- Region: East Midlands
- Country: England
- Sovereign state: United Kingdom
- Post town: LINCOLN
- Postcode district: LN4
- Dialling code: 01526
- Police: Lincolnshire
- Fire: Lincolnshire
- Ambulance: East Midlands

Dorrington is a village and civil parish in the North Kesteven district of Lincolnshire, England. It is situated 1.2 miles (2 km) both south from Digby and north from Ruskington. It is to the east of the north–south B1188, which lies just within the parish boundaries. The nearest town is Sleaford, approximately 4 miles (6 km) to the south.

In the 2001 census, the parish had a population of 340, increasing slightly to 344 at the 2011 census.

Dorrington Grade I listed Anglican church is dedicated to St James and St John. It is mainly in Decorated style. On the sides of the east window are ogee canopied niches. The church tower previously held a spire. On the exterior of the east window is a sculpture of the Last Judgment. The church is situated on the B1188 approximately 0.5 miles (0.8 km) north-west from the village centre, overlooking the village.

Frank Whittle lodged at a house in the village while developing the jet engine at RAF Cranwell; the remains of this house lie near the church. In the village are the remains of a Grade II listed Medieval ashlar cross.

The Peterborough to Lincoln Line passes to the east of the village. The village public house was the Musicians Arms on Main Street which closed down and was converted into a Londis convenience store opening its doors on 21 April 2025.
