= Billinghay =

Village and civil parish in the North Kesteven district of Lincolnshire, England

Coordinates: 53.079248°N 0.281090°W

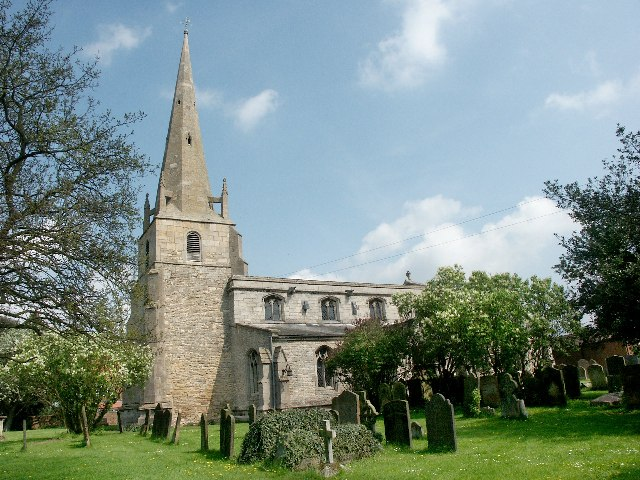
- St Michael and All Angels' church, Billinghay

- Location within Lincolnshire
- Population: 2,203 (2021)
- OS grid reference: TF152549
  - London: 110 mi (180 km) S
- District: North Kesteven
- Shire county: Lincolnshire
- Region: East Midlands
- Country: England
- Sovereign state: United Kingdom
- Post town: Lincoln
- Postcode district: LN4
- Police: Lincolnshire
- Fire: Lincolnshire
- Ambulance: East Midlands
- UK Parliament: Sleaford and North Hykeham

Billinghay is a village and civil parish in the North Kesteven district of Lincolnshire, England. The village is situated approximately 7 miles (11 km) north-east from Sleaford, and lies on the B1189 Walcott road near its junction with the A153. Just south of the village towards Sleaford is North Kyme. According to the 2001 census the parish had a population of 1,808, increasing to 2,190 at the 2011 census, increasing to 2,203 at the 2021 census.

The settlement is mentioned in the Domesday Book. The name originates from a Saxon name for a fishery. The topography in ancient times would have been that of a small settlement on a gravel mound surrounded by marsh which was flooded in winter. After the draining of the fens in the late 18th century the area became rich agricultural land as it is today.

Billinghay parish church is an Anglican church dedicated to St Michael and All Angels. It dates from the 12th, 13th, 14th and 15th centuries, with some later additions, and parts of it have been rebuilt. It is a Grade I listed structure. The parish is part of the Carr Dyke group of parishes, which also includes churches at Martin, North Kyme, South Kyme and Walcott.

After the phased closure of Lafford High School due to falling pupil numbers between 2008 and 2010, Billinghay Primary School remains the only school in the village. It is a voluntary controlled Church of England school, which has close ties with the Church of England, but responsibility for employing staff and maintaining the building remains with the local authority.

In 1986 village was twinned with Ballon, in the Sarthe department of France.

== Billinghay Skirth ==
Billinghay Skirth, which is also known as the River Skirth, is a waterway that runs through the village and ends at the River Witham. It gets its water supply from Digby Dam and Farroway Drain, two drainage channels that meet to the south-west of the village. Within the village it is crossed by two bridges. Old Bridge carries the B1189 road, and New Bridge carries Church Street. Shortly after the second bridge, it is joined by Car Dyke, a Roman waterway which may have been used for navigation. It winds its way towards the Witham, and near the junction, there are a pair of mitred flood doors, which close when river levels in the Witham exceed those in Billinghay Skirth, to prevent flooding of the surrounding land. Finally, a bridge carries a minor road called Witham Bank across the waterway.

Since November 2008 there has been an active campaign by the Billinghay Skirth Regeneration Society to restore navigation on the River Skirth, and the project has won the support of Billinghay and other parish councils, the Inland Waterways Association, the Environment Agency, Lincolnshire County Council and the Lincolnshire Waterways Partnership. The distance from the Witham to the village is about 2.5 miles (4.0 km), and there is no navigation authority responsible for its use, although the Environment Agency are responsible for the flood defences. The river is known to have been used for the carriage of both grain and coal until the 1930s, when this traffic ceased. Following the activity of the Regeneration Society, six narrow boats attempted to reach the village in September 2009. They were able to navigate most of the way, but stopped a little short of the village, due to low water levels and silting of the channel.
