= School federation (England and Wales) =

Group of schools in England and Wales

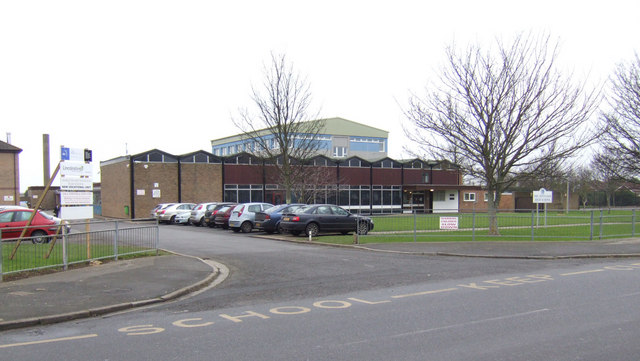
Tennyson High School in Mablethorpe, Lincolnshire (pictured above) federated with Monks' Dyke Technology College in 2010. In 2012 they merged to form Monks' Dyke Tennyson College.

A school federation, often referred to simply as a "federation", is a group of schools in England and Wales which, as defined in the Education Act 2002, operate under a statutory shared governing body (a hard federation or hard governance federation), or whose governing bodies form a shared committee with collaborative terms of governance (a soft federation, collaboration or collegiate). Soft federations with a statutory committee can be called soft governance federations. Schools in a federation are known as federated schools.

A number of federations in England have become multi-academy trusts, groups of academy schools operating under a shared governing body through a different legal framework to hard federations. Many of these continue to call themselves federations, such as the Harris Federation, and some have remained federations in the non-academy school sector, such as the Primary Advantage Federation. Academies and academy trusts were originally unable to join or form statutory federations, but this restriction was removed by the Education Act 2011.

== Types ==
A 2009 study from the National College for School Leadership identified six broad and sometimes overlapping types of federation, excluding hard and soft federations:

- Cross-phase federation: A federation whose member schools encompass different educational stages, such as a federation between a primary school and a secondary school. These federations are the most common.
- Performance federation: A federation between two or more successful and failing schools. The effects of federating are the strongest in performance federations, although it may take between two and four years after formation for them to make an impact.
- Size federation: A federation whose membership consists of multiple small schools or one small school and one average-sized school.
- Mainstreaming federation: A federation between two or more special needs and mainstream schools.
- Faith federation: A federation between two or more schools with the same religious character.
- Academy federation/group: A federation between two or more academy schools with the same sponsor. These federations are the least common, but are granted an extra £25,000 in funding that is not available to their non-academy counterparts.

Academy federation is often used synonymously with multi-academy trust. Multi-academy trusts are sometimes described as another type of federation and the term academy federation has increasingly fallen into disuse, with these federations instead being incorrectly called multi-academy trusts. Likewise, many federations that have since become multi-academy trusts continue to call themselves federations. Multi-academy trusts and academy federations operate through different legal frameworks and are structured differently. It is also common for a multi-academy trust to be a national body, whereas academy federations are usually regional.

== History ==
=== 20th century ===
Prior to the assent of the Education Act 1980 it was common for schools across the United Kingdom to share one governing body. This practice was prohibited by the act, although local education authorities were still able to unify two primary schools under one governing body as long as one of these schools were voluntary aided or controlled. This was done to support the Thatcher government's goal of giving all state schools a unique identity. The practice of schools sharing governing bodies was modified further in the Education Act 1986, which legally extended to England and Wales. The act restricted the primary schools automatically eligible to share a governing body to those located in the same local area; attempts by a local education authority to establish a shared governing body for schools outside this criterion now required consent from the Education Secretary. The Education Secretary could now also dissolve these governing bodies at will. These modifications were slightly altered in the Education Act 1996, however the Blair government's School Standards and Frameworks Act 1998 repealed its provisions and all shared governing bodies between schools were dissolved on the day of its assent.

=== 21st century ===
==== England ====
The 3E's Enterprises "federation" of schools was launched in 2001 under the leadership of Kinghurst City Technology College. The federation's other members were King's College and Kings International College and three companies from the private sector. This federation aimed to spread Kinghurst CTC's success to failing schools and lacked the centralised legal framework seen in later federations, with it instead operating as a loose alliance of schools. It was non-profit as any profit made went back into the federation.

Plans to introduce more federations were announced by Education Secretary Estelle Morris in December 2001, a move that had the backing of Prime Minister Tony Blair. Failing schools and their successful counterparts would federate under the orders of Ofsted, the non-ministerial government department responsible for overseeing standards in the English education system, and privately funded executive headteachers would lead them through a shared governing body. Her successor Charles Clarke enabled the legal implementation of these federations through the Education Act 2002, with the first being introduced in September 2003.

The first federations were often established through a brokered agreement with local authorities. Local authorities did this to improve their schools and find ways around a lack of recruitable headteachers. This was the same reason for creating school federations in the Netherlands. The first local education authorities to implement federations in their areas were Bradford City Council, Birmingham City Council, Essex County Council and Gateshead Borough Council.

Early federations focussed on improving school standards and could have five or six schools within them. This limit was removed in the School Governance (Federations) (England) Regulations 2007, which was implemented after the introduction of trust schools in the Education and Inspections Act 2006. The Labour government had previously hoped that all secondary schools would federate by this time, however this goal was never realised.

Prime Minister Gordon Brown pledged a large expansion of federations across the country in his Labour Party manifesto for the 2010 general election, with a goal of increasing the amount of federated schools from 500 to 1,000 by 2015 if his government was re-elected. Labour lost the election and the Conservative–Liberal Democrat coalition government entered office. The coalition realigned the government's education policy towards academy schools and multi-academy trusts. Non-academy federations have since been considered to be the "second best model" to academisation and are seen as an acceptable alternative for schools choosing to remain under local authority control.

In 2011 there were 600 federated schools in England.

==== Wales ====
The ability for schools to federate in Wales was introduced by The Federation of Maintained Schools and Miscellaneous Amendment (Wales) Regulations 2010. The Welsh Government's policy was to increase collaboration between schools and federations were one of its main programmes for implementing this policy. At this time, federations were also used to combat the shortage of Welsh headteachers, with almost 40 headteachers having taken leadership of the new federations. The Welsh Government also planned to give local authorities and governing bodies the ability to create federations, which were successfully implemented by The Federation of Maintained Schools (Wales) Regulations 2014. These regulations introduced a limit of six schools per federation in Wales in accordance with the Review of the Future Delivery of Education Services in Wales.

In 2019 there were 72 federated schools across 31 hard federations in Wales, or five per cent of all the schools in Wales. Most of these were primary schools. In 2022 there were 101 federated primary schools across 47 federations.

== Federation process ==
In England, school governors discuss a proposal for their school to federate and, in the case that they are attempting to join an existing federation, must submit this proposal to the federation's governing body or committee, where they can then give preliminary consent to the school joining its federation. This is not required for schools creating a new federation. From this point, schools planning to federate with each other must jointly publish their proposals and send them to key stakeholders, including parents. These proposals must be up for inspection at all times. The schools may then decide to federate, after which they must jointly inform their local authorities and the Education Secretary of the new federation a week before its creation. An instrument of government is then implemented and, in the case of hard federations, on the date of federation the schools' governing bodies are dissolved and replaced by the newly incorporated federal governing body. The schools' land, property, rights and liabilities are transferred to this governing body.

The procedure is largely the same in Wales, although local authorities have a higher level of involvement in the process in comparison to their English counterparts. In addition, Welsh local authorities have the ability to create federations themselves. This procedure is almost identical to the procedure used by schools' governing bodies and the local authorities must cooperate with and have the consent of the schools involved in its plans for federation. This includes the schools' sponsors, diocese and, in the case of foundation schools, whoever appoints their governors.

== Evaluation ==
In 2011 Ofsted, England's non-ministerial government department responsible for inspecting schools, evaluated the impact of federated schools with shared leadership, primarily hard federations whose schools shared one headteacher, on educational provision and outcomes. Ofsted found improvements in all 29 federations that they inspected, with there being increased achievement, attainment and better teaching. Pupils' behaviour also improved and it was found that they were more confident as their friendship circles had increased. Another cause of increased confidence in pupils was the larger pool of opportunities available to them. Cross-phase federations also made the changes between their educational stages academically stronger. School leaders viewed federations favourably, citing benefits such as better logistics. The main factor that caused all of these improvements was the effective leadership brought by federations.

=== Reasons for federating ===
Ofsted found three main reasons that schools in England had for federating. One reason was to protect educational prospects in the local community in the case that the school was in danger of closure or had failed to recruit enough high-performing staff. This was mostly the case in small, rural primary schools. Another reason was to strengthen the overall education of pupils across communities, which was the main reason in cross-phase federations. Another reason was an approach by the local authority to successful schools, which often resulted with them federating with schools causing concern. Federation was often an alternative to a local authorities' plan to close a school, having been enacted after backlash from these schools and the local community. The majority of schools also federated for practical and economic reasons.

In Wales, it was found by Estyn in 2019 that the majority of federations were established to ensure that schools – usually small schools, rural schools, isolated schools and Welsh-medium schools struggling to find headteachers – could recruit strong leaders and sustain survival in the long-term. In the case of local authorities, another reason for establishing a federation was to improve struggling schools. These efforts succeeded when the new federations had strong leadership. Unlike in England, economic reasons for federating often took a back seat to educational provision and employing headteachers.

== See also ==
- Multi-academy trust
- Education Action Zone
