= Anwick =

Village in Lincolnshire, England

Coordinates: 53.039955°N 0.339305°W

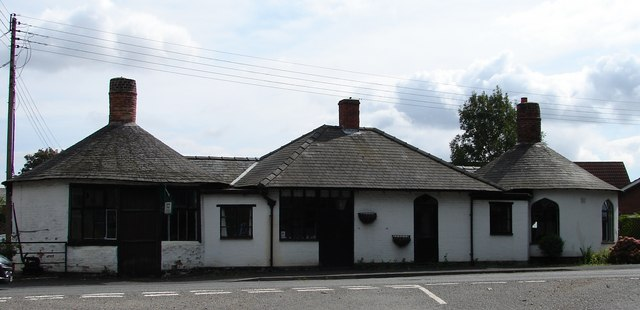
- Anwick Forge

- Location within Lincolnshire
- Population: 392 (2011)
- OS grid reference: TF114504
  - London: 100 mi (160 km) S
- District: North Kesteven
- Shire county: Lincolnshire
- Region: East Midlands
- Country: England
- Sovereign state: United Kingdom
- Post town: Sleaford
- Postcode district: NG34
- Police: Lincolnshire
- Fire: Lincolnshire
- Ambulance: East Midlands
- UK Parliament: Sleaford and North Hykeham

Anwick is a small village and civil parish in the North Kesteven district of Lincolnshire, England. The population of the civil parish at the 2011 census was 392. The village is situated 4 miles (6 km) north-east from Sleaford, on the A153 between Sleaford and Billinghay, and 16 miles (26 km) south-east from the city and county town of Lincoln.

== History ==
Anwick is mentioned in the 1086 Domesday Book as "Amuinc" and "Haniwic". The manor was in the Hundred of Flaxwell in Kesteven, and comprised 29 households with 5 villagers 3 smallholders and 21 freemen, and 6 ploughlands. In 1066 Lord of the manor was Toki son of Auti; in 1086 lordship was transferred to Ralph, nephew of Geoffrey Alselin, and Drogo of la Beuvrière. Tenancy-in-chief of manorial land was part held by la Beuvrière and part by Alselin.

Anwick was described in John Marius Wilson's 1870-72 Imperial Gazetteer of England and Wales as:

"a parish in Sleaford district, Lincoln; near the Sleaford canal, 4½ miles ENE of Sleaford r. station. Post Town, Sleaford. Acres, 1,820. Real property, £2,773. Pop., 277. Houses, 58. The property is divided among a few. The living is a vicarage annexed to the rectory of Brauncewell, in the diocese of Lincoln. The church is good."

In 1885 Kelly's Directory noted the parish as part of the Sleaford Poor Law Union. The principal landowner was The Marquess of Bristol. Chief crops were wheat, beans, barley, turnips and seeds [potatoes], in a parish area of 2,019 acres (8 km^{2}). Population in 1881 was 348.

=== RAF Anwick ===
During the First World War there was a Royal Flying Corps airfield north of the village. It was later named RAF Anwick, and was occasionally laid-out as a decoy airstrip during the Second World War in an effort to confuse enemy airmen that they were overhead RAF Digby, a genuine fighter airfield.

== Landmarks ==
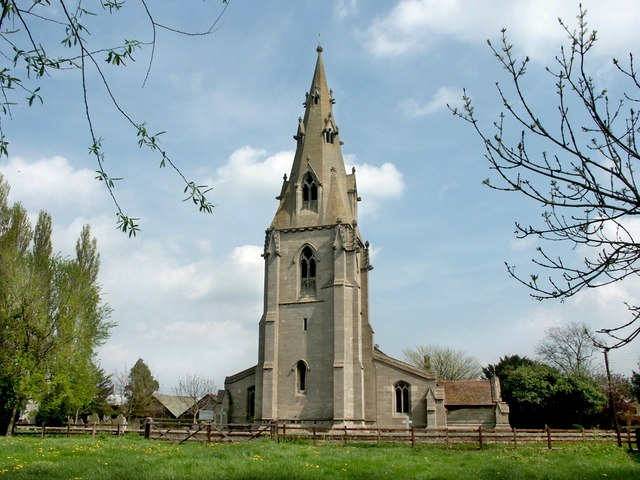
Church of St Edith, Anwick

The Anglican Church of St Edith is a Grade I listed Early English church dating to the late 13th or early 14th centuries. The church was restored in 1859 and the spire rebuilt in 1906 after being struck by lightning. Two glacial erratic boulders, the Drake Stones, lie next to the churchyard.

Anwick has a 200+-year-old forge in the centre of the village, said to be designed by architect John Nash; it is still a traditional blacksmith shop. Anwick also has a chicken-processing factory, a garden centre, a low-security independent hospital for men, and a private airstrip on nearby arable land (the airstrip is unrelated to the Second World War dummy airfield and on a different site).
