= North Kyme =

Village in Lincolnshire, England

Coordinates: 53.059230°N 0.28343°W

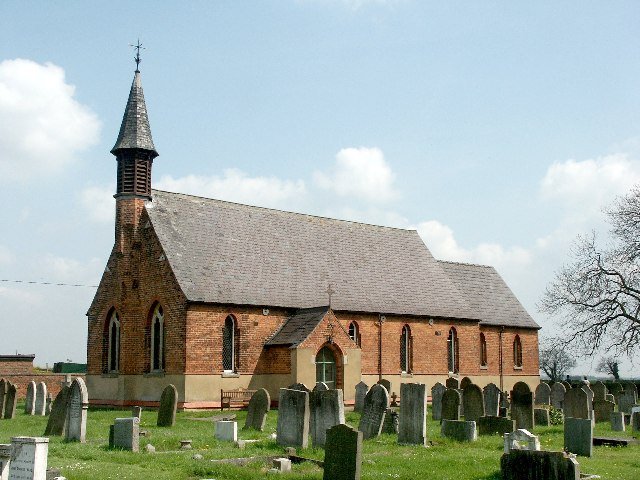
- St Luke's Church, North Kyme

- Location within Lincolnshire
- Population: 431 (2011)
- OS grid reference: TF151527
  - London: 110 mi (180 km) S
- District: North Kesteven
- Shire county: Lincolnshire
- Region: East Midlands
- Country: England
- Sovereign state: United Kingdom
- Post town: Lincoln
- Postcode district: LN4
- Police: Lincolnshire
- Fire: Lincolnshire
- Ambulance: East Midlands
- UK Parliament: Sleaford and North Hykeham

North Kyme is a village and civil parish in the North Kesteven district of Lincolnshire, England. The civil parish had a population of 431 at the 2011 census. It is situated on the A153 road, and 16 miles (26 km) south-east of Lincoln.

North Kyme has a church dedicated to Saint Luke, which was built in 1877 of red brick to a design by Drury and Mortimer, and is a Grade II listed building. It replaced an earlier church which had been pulled down during the Reformation.

The village cross dates from the 14th century and is Grade II listed, and also a scheduled monument. It was restored in the 1820s.

North Kyme Primary School opened in 1866, and was leased to the North Kyme School Board when it formed in 1879. Fire destroyed the wooden buildings of the junior and senior classrooms on 20 May 1952, but the school survived until 2005, when it closed.

The village has a public house, The Plough Inn, and a village hall.
