= The Aveland High School =

School in Lincolnshire, England

The Aveland High School was a secondary-level, co-educational Community School in the Billingborough, a village in the English county of Lincolnshire. The school served pupils aged 11 to 16 before it closed at the end of 2009. The school used a secondary modern style admissions procedure and had a capacity for 438 pupils.

== History ==
=== Construction ===
It was built by Foster's of Wharf Road in Grantham. It cost £112,800, with furnishing and equipment costing £18,100. It had 11 acres. The Thermagard system was the building. Architect for the county was JWH Barnes. It was intended for about 300 kids.

=== Opening ===
It opened in January 1963, and officially opened on Tuesday 21 May 1963 by James Heathcote-Drummond-Willoughby, 3rd Earl of Ancaster, the Lord-Lieutenant of Lincolnshire, with the Bishop of Grantham, Anthony Otter. The school had meant to be opened by the government minister Sir Chris Chataway. The head boy was William Creasey.
