= List of schools in Sleaford =

Sleaford is a market town and civil parish in the North Kesteven district of Lincolnshire, England. It is the largest settlement in North Kesteven with a population of 19,807 in 2021. The town has four state primary schools, three state secondary schools and one independent special school as of 2024. It retains a selective system for its secondary schooling, with the town's two single-sex grammar schools requiring pupils to pass the eleven-plus exam before enrolment.

== Primary ==
Sleaford has four state primary schools:

Name	Type	Enrolment	Founded	Notes
William Alvey Church of England School	Academy	650 (mixed, aged 4 to 11)	1729	In 1729 William Alvey bequeathed land to fund teaching children in Sleaford, establishing Alvey's Charity School. In 1851, it became a national school and a schoolhouse was built on East Road (opened in 1852). New buildings for the infants' school were constructed in 1888. William Alvey Church of England school is housed in the same buildings, though heavily extended. (Note: The buildings were extended in 1910, 1953 and 1958. To cope with rising numbers of pupils (largely as a result of the housing developments being built around the town), the original school building was extended in 1976; the old schoolhouse was refurbished in 1988, while replacement classrooms were completed for part of the school in 1994 following a fire; further extensions were opened in 1995 and 1997. Further classrooms were added in the early 2000s.) It became an academy in 2012 and in 2022 was rated "good" by the Office for Standards in Education, Children's Services and Skills (Ofsted).
St Botolph's Church of England School	Voluntary controlled	406 (mixed, aged 5 to 11)	1867	Charles Kirk built a school and chapel at Quarrington in 1867. It was renamed from Quarrington Infants School to St Botolph's Church of England Infants School in 1999, and in 2002 moved to a new site. As of 2023, St Botolph's Church of England Primary School is rated "good" by Ofsted.
Our Lady of Good Counsel Roman Catholic School	Academy	166 (mixed, aged 4 to 11)	1882	Our Lady of Good Counsel Roman Catholic School opened in 1882 adjoining the Catholic chapel (later church) on Jermyn Street. It remained housed there until 1974–75, when it moved to a new purpose-built site on The Drove. It converted to an academy in 2013. As of 2023, it had 166 boys and girls aged 4 to 11 on roll; Ofsted rated "good" the good in 2023.
Church Lane Primary School and Nursery	Community school	203 (mixed, aged 3 to 11)	1908	In 1908, the county council opened Sleaford Council School at Church Lane; its senior division became a separate secondary modern school in 1945 and moved from the site in 1983, but Sleaford County Infants School remained at Church Lane, changing its name to Church Lane Infants School in 1999. It is housed in buildings constructed in 2002, when the original school house was demolished. At its latest Ofsted inspection (in 2014), Church Lane Primary School was rated "outstanding".

Other elementary schools have existed historically. In 1835, there were eight-day schools and three Sunday schools in New Sleaford and two daily schools in Old Sleaford. An infant school in the old playhouse on Westgate opened in c. 1855 but had closed by the early 1950s. Wesleyan schools attached to the chapel on North Street accommodated up to 200 pupils in the 1870s, but closed when the Council School opened in 1908 (the pupils and staff being transferred there). In addition to various small private girls' schools, short-lived private schools for boys were established by Mr Herring and Charles Boyer in 1851, Henry Carruthers in the late 19th century, and Edwin Reginald Dibben in 1870 in competition with the grammar school.

== Secondary ==
The town has three secondary schools with sixth forms: a boys' grammar school, a girls' grammar school, and a mixed non-selective secondary school. The grammar schools are selective and pupils are required to pass the Eleven plus exam. The other school is not selective. The co-educational Sleaford Joint Sixth Form consortium allows pupils to choose subjects taught at all three schools.

Name	Type	Enrolment	Founded	Notes
Carre's Grammar School	Selective academy	806 (11 to 18: boys only in the lower school; mixed sixth form)	1604 (revived 1835)	Carre's Grammar School was founded in 1604 by a bequest of Robert Carre of Aswarby. It closed in 1816, but was revived in 1835 and a new building opened on North Street, where the school has been based ever since. It became an academy in 2011 and was judged to be "good" by Ofsted in 2023. It is run by the Robert Carre Trust.
Kesteven and Sleaford High School	Selective academy	763 (11 to 18: girls only in the lower school; mixed sixth form)	1902	Sleaford and Kesteven High School for Girls was established in 1902, and was taken over by the county council in 1919 (and renamed Kesteven and Sleaford High School). It became an academy in 2011 and was judged to be "good" by Ofsted in 2017. It was taken over by the Robert Carre Trust in 2015, which also runs Carre's.
St George's Academy	Comprehensive academy	2,319 (11 to 18; mixed; includes satellite site)	1908 (1945 as a secondary school)	St George's traces its origins to 1908 when Sleaford Council School opened. In 1945, the Council School's senior department became legally separate as Sleaford Secondary modern school. It operated across two sites until all teaching was consolidated at Westholme in 1983 and was renamed St George's School. It became a comprehensive in 1992, a Technology College in 1994 and an academy in 2010. As of 2024, it operates a satellite school at Ruskington; Ofsted judged it "good" in 2015.

== Other ==
As of 2024, Sleaford has one independent special school: Holton Sleaford Independent School, which opened in 2021; since 2022 it has been based at Westgate House. It caters for pupils with "social, emotional, and mental health difficulties". At its latest Ofsted inspection in 2022 it was rated "good".

Sleaford has also been home to adult education programmes. Having been run on informal lines for four years prior, in 1879 an art school was formally established in Duke Street in connection with the Science and Art Department; it ran until c. 1918. There was also the Sydney House School, a private art school operating from c. 1891 to c. 1918. A branch of the Workers' Educational Association had been established by the town by 1931 and produced a book on the town's history in 1981. The town's University of the Third Age branch was set up in 2003.
