= Carre's Grammar School =

Location
- Northgate; Sleaford, Lincolnshire, NG34 7DD; England; 53.00264°N 0.41098°W

Information
- Type: Grammar school; Academy
- Motto: Por dysserver (To deserve)
- Established: 1604; 422 years ago
- Founder: Robert Carre
- Trust: The Robert Carre Trust
- Department for Education URN: 137213 Tables
- Ofsted: Reports
- Chair: R. A. Hutton
- Head teacher: N. M. Law
- Staff: 114 (2022)
- Gender: Boys only. Co-educational sixth form
- Age: 11 to 18
- Enrolment: 788 (2023)
- Sixth form students: 227
- Houses: Bristol; Carre; Lafford; Welby; Year 9 split into 9.1-5(2024-25)
- Colours: Red, Black
- National ranking: 386
- Alumni: Old Carrensians
- Website: www.carres.uk

Carre's Grammar School is a selective secondary school for boys in Sleaford, a market town in Lincolnshire, England.

Founded on 1 September 1604 by an indenture of Robert Carre, the school was funded by rents from farmland and run by a group of trustees. The indenture restricted the endowment to £20 without accounting for inflation, causing the school to decline during the 18th century and effectively close in 1816. Revived by a decree from the Court of Chancery in 1830 new buildings were constructed at its present site and the school reopened in 1835. Faced with declining rolls and competition from cheaper commercial schools, Carre's eventually added technical and artistic instruction to its Classical curriculum by affiliating with Kesteven County Council in 1895. Following the Education Act 1944, school fees were abolished and Carre's became Voluntary Aided. New buildings were completed in 1966 to house the rising number of pupils. After plans for comprehensive education in Sleaford came to nothing in the 1970s and 1980s, Carre's converted to grant-maintained status in 1990. Foundation status followed and the school became an Academy in 2011. The Robert Carre Trust, a multi-Academy trust with Kesteven and Sleaford High School was formed in 2015 to manage the school; it ceased to exist in 2025, when it merged into the Community Inclusive Trust.

Admission to Carre's is through the eleven-plus examination and entry is limited to boys in the lower school, although the Sixth form is co-educational. The total number of pupils on roll in 2024–25 was 789, out of a capacity of 830; this included 227 Sixth Formers (as of 2023). Teaching follows the National Curriculum and pupils generally sit examinations for ten or eleven General Certificate of Secondary Education (GCSE) qualifications in Year Eleven (aged 15–16). They have a choice of three or four A-levels in the sixth form, which is part of the Sleaford Joint Sixth Form consortium between Carre's, Kesteven and Sleaford High School and St George's Academy.

In 2024, the school received an "average" Progress 8 score; 67% of pupils achieved English and mathematics GCSEs at grade 5 or above, which was much higher than the national figure. The average A-Level grade in 2019 was a B−, the same as the national average; much higher proportions of A-Level leavers stay in education after Sixth Form (69%) and secure degrees than the national average, though the government's progression score for Carre's Sixth Form leavers assesses their rate of progression as "average" relative to pupils' prior attainment. An Office for Standards in Education, Children's Services and Skills (Ofsted) inspection in 2023 graded Carre's Grammar School as "good" in every category.

== History ==
=== The first school ===
Carre's Grammar School was founded on 1 September 1604 by way of an indenture between Robert Carre (a member of the Carr or Carre family) and several local gentlemen. Carre granted 100 acres of agricultural land in Gedney to these men, who held the land in trust as feoffees. The lands were estimated to be worth £40 per annum and the indenture stipulated that £20 of this would be paid to the school master, while the remainder would be for the benefit of the town's poor. The indenture stated that the school was to provide for "the better education of the Youth and Children born or inhabiting with their parents within New Sleaford, Old Sleaford, Aswarby, and Holdingham ... and in Quarrington, North Rauceby, South Rauceby, Anwick, Kirkby la Thorpe and Evedon." It is not known whether there was any other school in the town prior to the foundation of Carre's, although the indenture appointed Anthony Brown, already a schoolmaster, as the master; it thus seems likely that Carre already operated a school and his indenture codified pre-existing arrangements.

Throughout the 1620s the trustees reported problems receiving rents from the tenants in Gedney. Although the school received a bequest from a local gentleman, Robert Cammock, in 1631, which provided an additional income of £4 per annum, no more followed; the English Civil War also disrupted funding: rents were not collected between 1644 and 1646. These financial problems were compounded by the nature of the land itself: it was agricultural and not urban, thus it did not increase in value significantly in the 17th century. Carre's lagged behind other schools and its buildings fell into disrepair as the fixed endowment failed to keep up with inflation (despite the Gedney lands increasing in value to £180 by the early 19th century). In 1783, the foeffees (by then, often called trustees) spent £50 on improvements, but by 1794, the adjacent Carre's Hospital agreed that part of its building be pulled down to make way for a new schoolhouse. This did not materialise and pupils were taught in the vestry at St Denys' Church by the early 19th century. In 1816, the trustees discontinued the master's salary because there were "no duties to perform" at the school.

=== Revival, stagnation and modernisation ===
The trustees met in 1821 and agreed that "much good" could come from reviving the school. In 1828 they petitioned the Court of Chancery for a scheme, which was approved in 1830, providing the master with a salary of £80 per annum. Four years later, the Chancery agreed to fund the rebuilding of the school at a site on Northgate. With the buildings complete, the school reopened on 1 August 1835.

Carre's maintained roughly 20 pupils on roll throughout the 1840s, but by 1858, this had fallen to two free scholars and two boarders. When the charity commissioners inspected the school the following year, they recommended that an usher be appointed to teach "commercial education" to supplement the Classics. In 1869 the Schools Enquiry Commission reported a "general dissatisfaction in the town" towards the school, finding "indifferent" discipline along with poor spelling, an inability to decline simple Latin nouns, and a low level of arithmetic. According to the report, the "general wish in the town is for a commercial school". Competition soon arose in the form of Mr Boyer's academy and later E. R. Dibben's commercial school at Mount Pleasant, Sleaford. Although the trustees were reorganised in 1876, Britain's agriculture suffered from foreign competition in the 1880s, which contributed to a decline in the rolls; a subsequent reduction of fees in 1889 proved ineffective and only twelve boys were in attendance the following year.

The Commissioner of Inquiries suggested that Kesteven County Council could support the teaching of art, modern languages and technical and scientific subjects through the Local Taxation Act 1890. In 1895 the governors agreed to affiliate with the Council, which granted them £35. The headmaster, Samuel Brown, appointed an assistant master and his wife was employed to teach art. The numbers rose so that in 1897 there were 33 pupils on roll, and the Committee granted a further £400 to pay for new accommodation and resources. The Governors, however, applied for £1,500 to build a new school entirely but the Council wanted it to be coeducational, which caused a lengthy stalemate. The demand for a coeducational school disappeared in 1902 when Sleaford and Kesteven High School for Girls opened as a private venture and so in 1904 a new building opened at Carre's, financed in part by the sale of the Gedney lands, while boarding accommodation followed in 1906. Following the Education Act 1902, Carre's received an allocation of £200 per pupil from the Board of Education, plus local authority assistance made in return for admitting pupils from local elementary schools. From 1919, elementary school pupils sat the entrance exam each term and those who passed were allocated the places which remained after fee-paying students had enrolled.

=== Post-war expansion and the comprehensive debate ===
The Education Act 1944 made secondary education available to all children up to the age of 15 and abolished fees for state-schooling; a "tripartite system" of secondary schooling was established to provide curricula based on aptitude and ability: grammar schools for "academic" pupils, secondary moderns for practical studies, and technical schools for science and engineering. Pupils were allocated to them depending on their score in the eleven-plus examination. Carre's became a Voluntary Controlled Grammar School; from 1945 all entry was by the County Selection Examination. By 1955, the school had 330 pupils on roll and the need for new accommodation was met in the 1950s and 1960s by a major building programme at the Northgate site; completed in 1966, this added dedicated classroom blocks, a canteen and hall.

The educational opportunities for secondary modern pupils were limited compared to those at grammar schools, prompting criticism of the tripartite system. In 1965, the Labour Government issued Circular 10/65 requesting Local Education Authorities implement comprehensive schooling. In 1971 Sleaford parents voted in favour of comprehensive education, but rejected the Council's proposals. A new plan which envisaged Carre's becoming a sixth form college was supported by parents in a vote (1,199 to 628), albeit with a 50% turnout; the County Council approved it but allowed governors a veto. Following negotiations with governors at Carre's, the scheme was revised so that Carre's would be an 11–18 school and adsorb Sleaford Secondary Modern's Church Lane site. Despite support from most staff and all three headteachers, Lincolnshire County Council voted to return the scheme for consultation in 1975. A new system was proposed which retained all three schools, and when the Government ordered the Council to choose a comprehensive scheme in 1977 it submitted that proposal, which had become popular with parents. The next year the government dismissed it on grounds that the Sixth Forms would be too small, but the council voted against the two-school system once more.

=== Grant-maintained status and Academy conversion ===
The 1979 general election brought a Conservative government to power and allowed the Council to shift its focus towards retaining Grammar Schools where they still existed and improving schools where work had been put on hold during the comprehensive debate; despite 90% of English councils adopting comprehensive education, Lincolnshire had retained many of its grammar schools. Although the County Council began discussing the abolition of them again in 1985, opposition from parents at a public consultation in 1987 resulted in the plans being dropped.

With the question of its future resolved, Carre's applied for grant-maintained status in 1989; the Education Secretary approved the proposals and formally granted the status in September 1990. When grant-maintained status was abolished in 1999, Carre's became a Foundation School. Following a successful bid to the DfES, submitted in 2002, the school was granted specialist Sports College status in 2003. An all-weather pitch was laid out in 2007, and a new technology building with a fitness suite opened in 2011. In 2009, Carre's became a specialist Science College and a lead school for gifted and talented students.

Carre's converted to Academy status in 2011. In 2014, the governors announced their intention to bid for conversion to a multi-Academy trust and become a coeducational, selective school on a new site; in February 2015, Kesteven and Sleaford High School announced its intention to join the proposed trust, a moved welcomed by Carre's. Carre's officially became part of the multi-academy Robert Carre Trust (RCT) on 1 September 2015; the schools continue to operate on their sites, sharing staff and facilities. In October 2025, the RCT merged into the Community Inclusive Trust (CIT), which took over the management of both schools.

== School structure ==
Carre's is a state-run selective secondary school on Northgate, Sleaford, with a Sixth Form. It converted to an Academy and reopened on 1 August 2011; since 2025, it has been governed by Community Inclusive Trust (CIT). Prior to 2025, it was governed by The Robert Carre Trust (RCT) and had converted to an Academy without sponsorship. Before September 2015, The Robert Carre Trust was called Carre's Grammar School Academy Trust. At Carre's, there are 99 staff in 2025; there is the full-time equivalent of 45.54 teachers, 3.6 senior leaders and 3.47 teaching assistants.

The school caters for pupils aged 11 to 18. Since the Education Act 2002, secondary school pupils have been placed in Years 7, 8 and 9 (grouped into Key Stage 3) and Years 10 and 11 (grouped into Key Stage 4), which coordinates how the National Curriculum is taught. Pupils are allocated into houses based on their forms. The first house system at Carre's consisted of four sets: scarlet, maroon, green and blue. They became houses in 1933 as Carre, Bristol, Lafford and Welby, named respectively after its founder, the Earls of Bristol, an old name for Sleaford, and Richard Welby, who owned the Gedney lands purchased by Carre.

Along with Kesteven and Sleaford High School and St George's Academy, Carre's is part of the Sleaford Joint Sixth Form, which was founded in 1983. It provides a common timetable across school sites and allows for pupils to choose from A-Level options offered at all three schools. Pupils may apply to be based at any one of the schools, where their pastoral and tutorial activities take place.

=== Student population ===
There were 789 pupils on roll in 2024–25, out of a capacity of 830; in 2023, the enrolment included 227 Sixth Formers. The school admits boys on a selective basis for Years 7–11 and has a co-educational Sixth Form. As of 2025, boys make up 92% of the school population. The annual intake to Year 7 will be 120 for the 2025–26 school year.

The last full Ofsted inspection of the school in 2023 did not provide information on the school's demographics; in 2013, Ofsted reported that the majority of pupils were White British. As of 2025, 4.6% of pupils spoke English as a second language, far below the national figure (18.6%); 8.5% of the pupils had been eligible for free school meals (FSM) in the previous six years (compared with 27.3% nationally); and 10.5% of pupils receive SEN support, which is slightly below the national average. Absence rates (6% overall and 16% persistent absence) are below the national average (9% and 26.5%, respectively).

=== Admissions ===
Admission to Years 7 to 11 at Carre's is selective. The school states that it accepts boys in "the top 25% of the ability range". For entry into Year 7, prospective pupils sit the eleven-plus examination to assess aptitude. Pupils must meet the pass score determined by the school; the test is set by GL Assessment on behalf of the Lincolnshire Consortium of Grammar Schools. Prospective students resident in Lincolnshire apply in accordance with Lincolnshire County Council's admissions arrangements. Those from other areas apply through their own local authority. The Governing Body is the school's admissions authority. If the school is oversubscribed, eligible applicants with an Education, Health and Care Plan will be allocated places first. The remaining applicants who passed the eleven-plus threshold would then be admitted in the following order: looked after (and previously looked after) children, pupils registered for the Pupil Premium (i.e., those who have received free school meals in the previous six years), and students who have a sibling at a school in the Robert Carre Multi-Academy Trust; any remaining places are then allocated according to the proximity of the pupil's home to the school. In cases where it is not otherwise possible to distinguish between two applicants but not enough places remain to make offers to them both, a lottery will be drawn. There is an appeals procedure organised by the local authority and run by an independent panel whose decision is binding on all parties.

Pupils applying at other times up to Year 11 must sit the nationally standardised cognitive ability test (CAT) for their age range (this includes verbal, non-verbal, quantitative and spatial elements). Applicants must be within the top 25% of ability in their cohort in the CAT to be eligible for a place. They must also "demonstrate that they would benefit from selective education". Eligible pupils are then ranked according to the criteria used for Year 7; if there are no places available, they are placed on a reserve list.

The Sixth Form has entry requirements based on GCSE attainment.

=== Uniform ===
The school uniform consists of a black blazer with the school badge embroidered on the breast pocket and a red braid on each pocket. Black trousers and black shoes are worn along with a white shirt and school tie, alongside the option of a V-neck black jumper. Sixth Formers are required to wear "smart" formalwear, which can include a suit with a shirt and tie; a formal jacket with skirt or trousers and a blouse or top; and a formal jacket and dress. In any case, smart shoes must be worn and all sixth formers at Sleaford Joint Sixth Form are issued with a lanyard which must be worn on the school premises.

== Curriculum ==
The curriculum during the 17th and 18th centuries is not known for certain. In 1714 the trustees agreed that the pupils should attend church services at St Denys' Church six days a week; whether this was adhered to is not clear. Religious practice was a stipulation in the 1835 decree, which required pupils to pray at the start and end of each day and engage in daily readings of holy scriptures. However, the emphasis was always on classical education, which likely required instruction in Latin from the earliest times; in 1835, learning the classics was enshrined as the school's primary purpose. In the mid-19th century, Carre's offered this classical education for free, but arithmetic, geometry and algebra were taught as extras at a rate of two guineas per term. Students were enrolled from the age of eight, and were expected to be able to read, write, recite the Lord's Prayer, the Apostles' Creed and the Ten Commandments, and "be qualified to begin Latin grammar". Students had to supply their own equipment, except pens and ink, which were covered by a 10 shilling payment made each term to the school. The school's inspection in 1865 mentions geography and history teaching, although the general standard of attainment was low.

In 1876, the curriculum was widened so that it comprised reading, writing, arithmetic, English, mathematics, history, geography, Latin, a foreign language, music, natural science and drawing, with Greek as an optional extra. The County Council supported technical and commercial subjects in the late 19th century, but after 1904 it was empowered to support secondary education in general, allowing Latin and other classical components of the curriculum to remain intact. After World War I, sixth form courses were developed allowing students to commence advanced studies in the arts and sciences. By the 1950s, a wide range were available: English language and literature, mathematics, French, German, Latin, Greek, art, history, geography, physics, chemistry and woodwork; biology was taught at Kesteven and Sleaford High School.

=== Key Stages 3 and 4 ===
The school follows the National Curriculum in Years 7–11 and offers a range of GCSEs (national exams taken by pupils aged 14–16), A-Levels (national exams taken by pupils aged 16–18) and vocational equivalents. Pupils may participate in a number of educational and sporting visits throughout their school career (including trips abroad).

For Key Stage 3 pupils, the curriculum as of 2025 comprises art, biology, chemistry, design and technology, English, ethics and philosophy, geography, history, ICT, mathematics, music, physical education, and physics; all pupils also study two foreign languages. Citizenship, sex and relationships education, and careers and work-related education are also taught to pupils. Year 7 students take cookery lessons.

As of 2025, in Key Stage 4 (Years 10 and 11), pupils study a core curriculum comprising biology, chemistry, English language and literature, mathematics, and physics GCSEs; pupils are also taught ethics and philosophy. Students are required to take four further GCSEs which must include a modern foreign language and three of any of the following: art, business studies, computing, electronics, engineering, French, geography, German, graphics, history, music, physical education, resistant materials, and Spanish. Pupils may voluntarily study for further GCSEs in Mandarin in evening classes and in Latin at lunch classes. Alongside this curriculum, pupils continue to study citizenship, sex and relationships education, and careers and work-related learning.

=== Sixth Form ===
The Joint Sixth Form allows pupils to choose from around 60 vocational or academic subjects including (as of 2024): A-Levels in biology; chemistry; computing; design engineering; drama; English language and/or literature; French; history; geography; German; fashion and textiles; law; mathematics; further mathematics; media studies; philosophy, ethics and religion; photography; physical education; physics; product design; psychology; sociology and Spanish. There are also BTEC/CTEC options in applied science; art; photography; business; computing; performing arts; and travel and tourism; as well as other diplomas or certificates in bricklaying, carpentry, childcare, early years practice, health and social care, hospitality, physical education and uniformed services.

=== Examinations ===
The government's Progress 8 score measures how far pupils at the school progress academically between Key Stages 2 and 4 compared with pupils across the country with similar results to them. The score for Carre's for the 2024/5 and 2025/6 academic years are not available due to Covid-19-related disruption to Key Stage 2 assessments. For those finishing Key Stage 4 in summer 2025, 78% of pupils attained GCSEs in English and mathematics at grade 5 or higher (equivalent to a high C or low B in the old grading system); this compared with 45% nationally. Its Attainment 8 score (measuring how well pupils scored in eight subjects including English, mathematics, three English Baccalaureate subjects and three other approved subjects) was 58%, compared with 46% nationally. The average point score across a pupil's English Baccalaureate was 5.46, compared with 4.09 across England and 3.98 in the local authority.

The average A-Level result was a B− grade in 2025, compared with a B− grade nationally and a C+ grade average across Lincolnshire's state-funded schools. The A-Level Progress 8 score for Carre's in 2025 was "above average" (0.15, with a confidence interval between 0.02 and 0.27), meaning that pupils do better than those with similar previous attainment nationally. The average grade for all academic qualifications was a B− (compared with a B− nationally); the Progress 8 score was also "above average" at 0.15 (confidence interval: 0.03 to 0.28). For applied general qualifications, the average grade was a Distinction−, higher than the national average of a Merit+; the Progress 8 score was "average" (0.23; confidence interval: -0.02 to 0.47).

For pupils who left the school in 2022 after completing Level 3 study (for instance, A-Levels), 76% went on to study for a degree at higher education institutions and 32% went to institutions placed in the top third of HE institutions; this compares to 60% and 19% nationally, respectively. 3% of leavers in that cohort completed higher apprenticeships, compared with 2% locally and nationally.

== Extra-curricular activities ==
As of 2026, school clubs and societies include various language clubs, sport clubs, musical activities and many others. Students may participate in the Duke of Edinburgh's Award Scheme, beginning with the Bronze grade in Year 9. Musical opportunities include participating in the school band and the choir; the school holds at least two concerts a year, and once a year hosts over 200 musicians from the local area who perform at the school. Sixth Formers can volunteer to be prefects, participate in the school's debate club and support fundraising work.

In the past, Carre's has offered a range of clubs and societies, including ones for archaeology, aero-building, bird-watching, boxing, chess, cycling, drama, languages, geography, jazz and other music groups, a choir and orchestra, and student voice groups, like the student council. The first school play performed by the Dramatic Society was She Stoops to Conquer in 1938. Trips to see plays, a Play Reading Society and a new dramatic society were formed under the guidance of the English master A. D. Winterburn. In 1968, plays were performed jointly with Kesteven and Sleaford High School. At the end of World War I, a cadet corps as formed by one Captain Price and became part of the Army Cadet Corps under the War Office; attendance at weekly parades was compulsory for pupils over 13 in the 1920s. Most pupils took part in its activities in World War II, under the lead of the History teacher, Major W. H. T. Walker; this included athletics competitions, shooting practice and trips to camp sites. It disbanded in c. 1963 when the two staff who ran it retired.

=== Sport ===
As with the curriculum, there are no references to sports being played at Carre's before the 19th century. In 1835, the Marquis of Bristol allowed the school to use an acre of land, which probably functioned as a playground. Sports fields were not added to the grounds until 1908, but the earliest reports of the school participating in sporting events pre-date this by half a century. In the 1860s, the Sleaford Gazette reported on cricket matches with local schools, namely the rival academies run by Mr Boyer and Mr Dibben in Sleaford; by the 1890s, these matches were being organised with more distant schools, like the grammar school at Grantham. Athletics were practised at the school as early as 1871 when a sports day was held; the 100 yards and half a mile races, hurdles, the pole jump and throwing the cricket ball were activities in which forms competed. Football was played at the school as early as 1895. Glebe land was acquired in 1908 for sporting purposes and levelled in the early 1930s. A cycling club was formed in the 1940s and badminton was informally organised by pupils by the 1950s; between 1957 and 1960, a portion of land was converted into tennis courts for the school and rugby was introduced in the 1966–67 academic year.

In 2025–26, the school pitched football, rugby union, basketball, cricket, golf and netball teams. In football, Carre's competes at district, county and national level at all groups, and nominate top-performing players to trial for the Lincolnshire Schools team; Carre's were finalists in the 2008–09 English Schools' Football Association (ESFA) Under 18 Schools' Trophy and have been semifinalists three times (2004–05, 2006–07, and 2013–14). The school was also a semifinalist in the ESFA Under 16 Schools' Cup in 2008-9, and won the ESFA Under 16 Elite Schools’ Cup in 2018–19, its first win in a national competition. In Rugby, the school competes at district and county level as well as in the Rugby Football Union NatWest Schools’ Vase for Under 15s and Under 18s. All age groups enter district and county competitions in basketball and the school competes at district and county level in cricket. Carre's hosts Under 13, Under 15 and Under 16 county volleyball competitions, while girls in the sixth form compete regionally in Under 19s netball.

== Site and property ==
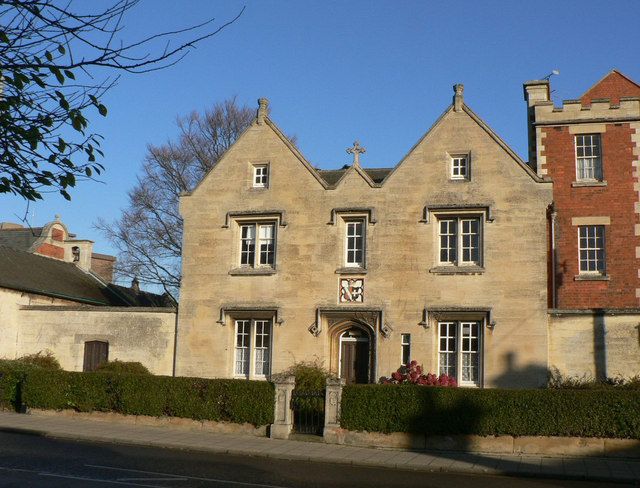
The 1835 school house

The original location of Carre's School is not known. From 1653, it operated in buildings on Eastgate, adjacent to Carre's Hospital. After these fell into disrepair in the late 18th century, pupils were taught in the vestry of St Denys' Church until the school was closed in 1816. In 1826, the trustees purchased a house on Northgate at the cost of £545 3s. from one Mr Squires. In 1834, the Chancery Court agreed to fund the rebuilding of the school according to plans by the Sleaford architect and builder Charles Kirk, who constructed it at a cost £1,168 15s. The building is in the Tudor Gothic style and built in Ashlar stone with slate roofs. It has three stories of three bays, with the upper floor housed in two gables. A shield with the arms of the Marquis of Bristol and his wife are located above the four-centre arch doorway. Single-storey wings exist on either side in a similar style. Brick additions were made in 1904 and 1906.

As the school roll grew, the old buildings became too small. A major building programme began in the 1950s: £128,000 was set aside to rehouse the school in purpose-built facilities adjacent to the existing school-houses. The first phase was opened in 1956 and included art and handicraft rooms; the second phase was completed in 1958 when physics and chemistry rooms were added; and the third came in 1965 with the opening of new biology and general science laboratories alongside other classrooms, while the following year saw a new hall/canteen and kitchen open. The final phase consisted of eight further rooms, built shortly afterwards.

A grant of £650,000 funded the construction of a technology centre with a computer suite, which opened in January 1993. Plans for a new sports hall were first discussed in 1990, but they only came to fruition in 1996, when Northgate Sports Hall opened. The Sports Council and the Foundation for Sport and the Arts donated £250,000 towards its construction; this was matched by North Kesteven District Council, while Carre's raised £50,000 towards the building work. An all-weather pitch at the school opened in 2007; it cost £649,000 to lay, half of which was met by the Football Foundation. A building programme costing £835,000 provided the school with food technology facilities and a two-storey Fitness Suite, which were opened in March 2011. As of 2022, the food technology facilities are unused and the room now supports the Sleaford Joint Sixth Form in study work.

== Headmasters ==
The indenture of 1604 made it compulsory that the master be a graduate of the University of Cambridge or Oxford and the majority of the pre-1835 masters had attended Cambridge, with only two from Oxford. When the school reopened in 1835, these stipulations were removed. The headmaster lived on site until Derek Lee began commuting from his home in 1975. The list below contains the names, years of service and biographical notes about the known headmasters of Carre's since its foundation. The current headmaster is Nick Law, who succeeded Mike Reading in 2008.

List of headmasters
Years	Name	Notes
1604–1609	Anthony Brown	Brown matriculated at Clare College, Cambridge, in c. 1591, graduating with a BA five years later. Ordained as a priest 1599/1600, he was Vicar of Metheringham in 1608.
1609–1615	John Newall	Newall matriculated at Christ's College, Cambridge, in 1588, graduating with a BA approximately three years later. He was Head Master at Boston Grammar School, 1597–1609.
1615–1619	William Etherington	Educated at Emmanuel College, Cambridge, from 1604, Etherington graduated with a BA in 1608–9. Ordained a priest in 1619/20, he was Vicar of Langton by Wragby in 1621.
1619–1622	John Kitchen	Kitchen (or Kitchin) attended Christ's College, Cambridge, matriculating in 1612 and graduating with a BA three years later. He was ordained a deacon in 1616.
?	Richard Northen	A native of Lincolnshire, Northen matriculated at Queens' College, Cambridge, in 1616, and graduated with a BA in 1620. He was ordained as a deacon in 1621/2 and as a priest in 1628.
1629–1635x36 and 1638x9–1646	Edmund Trevillian	Trevillian attended St John's College, Cambridge, matriculating in 1624 and graduated with a BA three years later.
1635x6–1638x9	Thomas Fancourt	A native of Lincolnshire, Fancourt was admitted to Emmanuel College, Cambridge, in 1627 and graduated with a BA in 1630/1. He probably died c. 1655.
1646–1663	Thomas Gibson	Gibson attended Queen's College, Oxford. He was a vicar of Horncastle. He denounced Calvinism and opposed the Parliamentarians during the Civil War. After joining the Royalists, he was captured and imprisoned at Hull. He was appointed schoolmaster at Carre's after his release.
1664	Peter Stephen/Stevens	According to Ellis, it is possible that he was an usher.
1667–1674x5	John Pereson	Pereson graduated from Trinity College, Cambridge.
1674x5–1683	Mr Ingham	His first name is not known, but he signed the school's minute book during this period. Ellis states he may have been of Brasenose College, Oxford.
1683–1690	William Wych	A native of Surrey, Wych (or Wyche) attended Emmanuel College, Cambridge, from 1674, graduating with a BA three years later. Ordained as a priest in 1680/1, he was Vicar of New Sleaford, 1682–91, and Rector of Silk Willoughby (1691–1718) and Ruskington (1707–18).
1690–1726	Matthew Smith	Born at Huby, Yorkshire, Smith was the son of a draper and educated at Sidney Sussex College, Cambridge, from 1680, graduating with a BA in 1683/4. He was Vicar of Dorrington, 1686–98; Rector of North Leasingham, 1694; and of South Leasingham, 1696–1709.
1726–1768	William Sellar	The son of Rev. Thomas Sellar, Vicar of New Sleaford, Sellar matriculated at St John's College, Cambridge, in 1727, received his BA four years later and was ordained a priest in 1732. Like his father, he was Vicar of New Sleaford, serving between 1737 and 1769.
c. 1768–1771	Mr Gunnil	His first name is not known, but he appears in the minute books from 1736 to 1771 and, although he was likely an usher, Ellis states he may have succeeded Sellar as master.
1781–1809	Edward Waterson	The son of a tanner, Waterson was born in Bridgefield-in-Furness, Lancashire, and educated at St John's College, Cambridge, from 1770; he graduated with a BA in 1774. Ordained as a priest and appointed Vicar of Great Chesterfield two years later, he was also Vicar of New Sleaford, 1781–1809, and Rector of Quarrington and Normanton. He died in 1809.
1811–1822	Elias Huelin	Heulin was born in Jersey, and matriculated at Pembroke College, Oxford, in 1809, aged 23. After leaving Carre's, he became a curate at Navenby and built up a landed estate. He was murdered in London in 1870 by his plasterer.
1835–1866	Henry Manton	Educated at Grantham, Manton attended St John's College, Cambridge and graduated with a BA in 1824; the following year, he was ordained as a priest. He was chaplain to the Sleaford Union, 1835–66; Curate of Aunsby, 1836–38; and Vicar of Kirkby Green, 1838–66. He died at Sleaford in 1866.
1866–1876	Christopher Child	The son of a farmer, Child was born at New Mill, Yorkshire. He attended St John's College, Cambridge from 1851, graduating with a BA in 1858. Ordained as a priest in 1864, he was Curate of Barningham and Barking, before he was appointed Curate of Ashby-de-la-Launde in 1867; he became Vicar there, serving from 1875 until 1888. He died at Branston in 1908.
1876–1894	Robert Gibson	Gibson graduated from London University a BA in 1875. He taught at the Royal Grammar School, Marlborough, 1868–72, before he was ordained a priest; he was curate of Leamington Hastings, 1873–76, Bloxholm, 1876–85, Cranwell, 1885–92, and Bicker, 1892–94. After resigning his post at Carre's, he served as Rector of Little Whelnetham until his death in 1929.
1894–1900	Samuel Brown	Brown was a native of Northborough, Northamptonshire, and attended Lincoln College, Oxford. He matriculated in 1879, aged 19, and graduated with a BA in 1884. In 1899 he offered his letter of resignation at Carre's, citing ill health and vacated the school the next year, moving to Long Sutton.
1900–1932	Edgar Craddock Watson	Watson attended London University before teaching at Darlington Grammar School and Framlingham College, Suffolk. He died in 1935 at his home in Sleaford, aged 66, and over 100 boys from the school attended his funeral.
1932–1944	Henry Alfred Shute	Shute attended University College, London. During World War II, he was an Air Raid Precautions officer, which, along with his school commitments, caused him to "suffer from overstrain". He died suddenly in 1944, aged 54.
1946–1950	James Leslie Nightingale	The son of Rev. James Nightingale, he graduated from Hatfield College, Durham with a BA in history (1929), followed by an MA (1932) and an MLitt (1937). Before Carre's, he taught at Morpeth Grammar School and King James I Grammar School, Bishop Auckland; he left in 1950 to be Head of Hull Grammar.
1951–1959	Denys Neville Guy Allott	Educated at Armstrong College, Durham, Allott taught at Ripon Grammar School (1938–1949) and Queen Elizabeth's Grammar School in Blackburn. After leaving Carre's, he was head at Gosforth Grammar School until he retired in 1975. He died in 1999.
1959–1975	David Hollingsworth Rees	Rees graduated from Cambridge University with a BA (1937, St John's College) and taught classics, being Senior Classics Master at Rochdale Municipal High School (appointed 1952) and then Dame Allan's Boys' School in Newcastle (appointed 1953) before becoming head of Carre's. He met his wife Dorothea (nee Gateshill) at Cambridge when she studied Classics at Newnham College. She also taught and, in Newcastle, taught Classics at Dame Allan's Girls' School. An active member of the Methodist community, he stayed in Sleaford after retiring and died in 1993.
1976–1983	Derek Lee	Lee taught at RMC, Sandhurst, the Haberdasher's School, London, and at High Wycombe, before he was appointed deputy head at King's Edward's School, Retford. He left Carre's to become head of The King's School, Grantham, where he remained until his retirement.
1983–1998	Peter Charles Freeman	Educated at Trinity Hall, Cambridge, Freeman began his teaching career in London and then spent four years in Manchester. He was head of English at Maidstone Grammar School and then Deputy Head at Simon Langton Grammar School in Canterbury before he joined Carre's.
1998–2003	Peter Leonard Wheeldon	Wheeldon became director of studies at the Sleaford Joint Sixth Form in 1989 and was Deputy Headteacher at Carre's, 1993–8. He retired once the sports specialism bid was complete in 2002–3, saying "I just feel the time has come for me to wind down".
2003–2008	Michael Dudley Reading	Reading taught at Oldham and The King's School in Grantham, was assistant principal at George Spencer School in Nottingham and returned to the King's School (2001–02) as a Deputy Head. After Carre's, he was head of the Oxford Academy until 2012.
2008–present	Nicholas Matthew Law	Educated at Lancaster and Newcastle Universities, Law taught at the Haven School in Boston before serving as Assistant Head at the King's School, Grantham (1994–2003) and Deputy Head at Spalding Grammar School from 2004 until his appointment at Carre's.

Source: Ellis 1954, pp. 40–41, 43 provides a list of all masters, and a record of their education, up to 1954. He notes that W. H. T. Walker and J. H. Batley acted as headmaster between appointments in the 1940s. Appointments from 1954 to 2004 are recorded in Harmston & Hoare 2003, pp. 154, 159, 160, 171, 179.

== Notable alumni ==
Carre's Grammar School has produced notable alumni across a range of fields. In politics, this includes Sir Robert Pattinson (1872–1954), member of parliament and chairman of Kesteven County Council, and his brother Samuel Pattinson (1870–1942), businessman and also a member of parliament. The diplomat Peter Bateman (b. 1955), who served as the British ambassador to Bolivia, Luxembourg, and Azerbaijan, was also a pupil at the school. In the military, Old Carrensians include Air Marshal Barry North (b. 1959) and Captain George Baldwin, CBE, DSO (1921–2005), a Director of Naval Air Warfare in the 1960s.

The lawyer and controversialist John Austin (1613–1669) studied at Carre's, as did the Royalist poet Thomas Shipman (1632–1680) and the non-conformist clergyman Andrew Kippis, FRS (1725–1795). Scientists who attended the school include the chemist Kenneth Wade, FRS (1932–2014) and the forensic pathologist Iain West (1944–2001).

In sports, the school has produced the professional footballers Paul Holland (b. 1973), who played for Mansfield Town, Sheffield United, Chesterfield, and Bristol City, and Mark Wallington (b. 1952), who played for the England under-23s and Leicester City. Among Old Carrensians in professional rugby are Ollie Chessum, who has played for Leicester Tigers, England and the British & Irish Lions, and Lewis Chessum, who played for the England under-20s.
