= Kesteven and Sleaford High School =

Selective school in Lincolnshire, England

Location
- Jermyn Street; Sleaford, Lincolnshire, NG34 7RS; England

Information
- Type: Selective grammar school Academy
- Motto: Educating today's pupils for tomorrow's society
- Established: 1902
- Department for Education URN: 137667 Tables
- Ofsted: Reports
- Chair of Governors: James Hoyes
- Head teacher: Josephine Smith
- Staff: 98 (of which FTE of 46 are teachers)
- Gender: Girls (Years 7 to 11); Girls and boys (Sixth Form)
- Age: 11 to 18
- Enrolment: 763 (2023–24)
- Colours: Green, yellow
- Website: http://www.kshs.uk/

Kesteven and Sleaford High School Selective Academy, commonly known as Kesteven and Sleaford High School (KSHS), is a selective school with academy status in Sleaford, an English market town in Lincolnshire. It caters for girls aged between eleven and sixteen in Years 7 to 11, and girls and boys aged sixteen to eighteen in its coeducational Sixth Form.

From the 1890s, the lack of secondary schooling for girls in Sleaford became a growing problem, but the county council lacked the funds to expand the boys' grammar school to take on girls. In 1902, a group of businessmen and gentlemen from Sleaford formed a private company to run Sleaford and Kesteven High School for Girls based on Southgate. A private school, it catered for boys under 8 and girls of all ages, including boarders, and had a preparatory department for the younger pupils; girls in the district could sit examinations to obtain a limited number of local authority scholarships which paid their fees.

In 1919, Kesteven County Council took over the school (renaming it Kesteven and Sleaford High School). It continued to charge pupils for their schooling until the passage of the Education Act 1944, when KSHS became a state grammar school and fees were abolished; the preparatory school was wound down as KSHS shifted to cater for girls over 11 only. A modern building complex was completed in three phases between 1957 and 1968 and the school acquired additional playing fields. Plans to comprehensivise Sleaford's schools came to nothing in the 1970s, after which KSHS joined Sleaford Joint Sixth Form (SJSF) in 1983 with the town's other secondary schools. KSHS completed another major building programme in 1996, became a visual arts specialist college in 2003 and opened another building in 2006. It pulled out of SJSF in 2010 and converted to an academy in 2011, before being taken over in 2015 by the Robert Carre Multi-Academy Trust, which also managed Carre's Grammar School. It rejoined the joint sixth form in 2016. In 2025, the RCT ceased to exist and both grammar schools were taken over by the Community Inclusive Trust.

Admission to the lower school is through the eleven-plus examination (for Year 7) or the cognitive ability test (for Years 8 to 11); entry to the Sixth Form is not based on testing, though there are minimum qualification requirements. There were 763 pupils on roll in 2024. Teaching follows the National Curriculum and pupils generally sit examinations for General Certificate of Secondary Education (GCSE) qualifications in Year Eleven (aged 15–16). They have a choice of three or four A-levels in the Sixth Form, which is part of the Sleaford Joint Sixth Form consortium with Carre's Grammar School and St George's Academy. In 2023, the school received a "well above average" Progress 8 score; 90% of pupils achieved English and mathematics GCSEs at grade 5 or above, which was far higher than the national figure. The average A-Level grade in 2023 was a B, slightly above the national figure; much higher proportions of A-Level leavers go on to higher education and to Russell Group universities than the national average, though the government's progression score for KSHS's Sixth Form leavers assesses their rate of progression as "average" relative to pupils' prior attainment. An Office for Standards in Education, Children's Services and Skills (Ofsted) inspection in 2017 graded KSHS "good" overall.

== History ==
=== Background ===
In the late 19th century, Carre's Grammar School was Sleaford's only secondary school; it admitted boys only. From 1893, Kesteven County Council's Technical Instruction Committee offered annual junior scholarships which paid the school fees for pupils who passed the scholarship examination, but because of the lack of other schools for girls, they were only tenable for girls at one institution in Lincoln, 18 miles away. As the Sleaford Gazette reported, there was no school "supplying a good, high-class education for the daughters and young children of middle-class and well-to-do residents in Sleaford and neighbourhood".

In the late 1890s, the county council wanted to expand Sleaford's secondary education provision. When the governors of Carre's Grammar School applied to the Technical Instruction Committee for a grant towards a new school building, the council wished to make the grant conditional on the school accepting girls. The governors suggested creating a separate girls' high school, but discussions turned to creating a combined high school for boys and girls. By 1899, plans had been approved by the county council and costed at £4,000, of which the council offered to provide £1,500. The Sleaford Tradesmen's Association supported the scheme and began fundraising. By September 1909, they had raised £540 and the school governors had raised a further £650, but £1,100 remained to be found. Aside from a commitment from Henry Chaplin to contribute £50 towards the cost, the situation had not changed by the end of the year. In 1900, a local newspaper reported that "no further action had been taken towards the construction of High Schools at Sleaford owing to the lack of funds, about £1,000 more being required."

=== 1901–02: Origins ===
The problem was solved in 1901, when a syndicate of local gentlemen and businessmen launched a venture to establish a school for girls on a private basis. In November 1901, E. H. Godson purchased the architect Charles Kirk's house on Southgate (a road in Sleaford) along with five cottages and stabling for £2,150; Godson was acting on behalf of the syndicate, "who propose[d] to convert it into a High School for girls". A company, The Sleaford and Kesteven High School for Girls Ltd, was incorporated on 12 December 1901. Its board of directors was chaired by W. V. R. Fane. (Note: The other directors were Thomas Samuel Brooks, George Godson, Thomas Evison Harrison, Thomas Henry Skinner, Norman Edward Snow, William Henry Spite, William Spyvee and John Ridal Wood. Fane is listed as chairman in the school prospectus preserved in The National Archives, Kew (ref. ED 35/1539).) By January 1902, the directors had issued 2,500 shares at £1 each and proceeded to allotment. Margaret Lewer, from Lincoln High School, was appointed headmistress and the school scheduled its opening for after Easter. Shortly before the school opened, the board of directors had asked the county council for grant in aid towards equipping and maintaining the school buildings, but the Board of Education would not sanction it because the school was for-profit. The school opened on 6 May 1902 and had 23 girls in attendance on its first day, taught by Lewer and two members of staff; there were five boarders.

=== 1902–19: Private school ===
The school was arranged into three forms: the youngest (kindergarten) form included under 8s; the middle form was for juniors, aged 8 to 12; and the eldest housed the seniors, aged over 12. Boys under the age of 8 could attend. Most students were fee-paying. The amount depended on their form; in 1905, the parents of a child in kindergarten paid £1 5s a term, while the termly fees for juniors were £2 12s and for seniors £3 3s. These fees covered the provision of a "main course", while parents would pay additional fees towards stationery and meals, and could opt at further cost for their children to partake in games and "extra" courses. When the school opened, the Technical Instruction Committee agreed to add the school to the list of places where the county's Minor Scholarships were tenable. These enabled girls to attend without paying fees, but there were relatively few and girls qualified by sitting the eleven-plus examination; the number of free places changed depending on the number of fee-payers.

The school occupied Kirk's house on Southgate and used the garden for sports. The headmistress, her assistants and boarders also lived in the building. By 1904, a building with additional classrooms had been added at the end of the house's garden and the house was extended in c. 1904. In 1905, there were 93 pupils on roll, 23 of them boarders and 3 of them boys. In 1909, the company secretary asked the Board of Education about the school's eligibility for grants under the Regulations for Secondary Schools; the Board advised that the school would be eligible if the company were wound down and converted into an Educational Trust under a scheme made by the Board of Education. The Board would regard the paid-up share capital of £2,250 as debentures, which could be redeemed within 30 years. Four years later, the county council inquired about having the school registered as a Pupil Teacher Centre, but in 1914 the Board would not allow this as the school was still being run for profit.

=== 1919–44: Conversion to state school and new buildings ===
The Education Act 1918 made the provision of secondary education compulsory. To meet these requirements, the county council drew up a scheme for providing secondary education across its jurisdiction in August 1918 and decided to take over the running of the school and purchase its premises. Negotiations progressed through the autumn, and the company was voluntarily wound up in December 1918. The takeover was completed on 14 January 1919, and it was around this time that the name changed to Kesteven and Sleaford High School. The school remained fee-paying (with the exception of scholarship students), still accepted boarders and retained its preparatory school for young children (including boys).

In 1920, wooden huts were added on a stretch of grassland to provide more classrooms and an assembly hall. Further extensions were completed in 1924 and 1927, and another wooden building was added in c. 1930. Plans to completely rebuild the school were drawn up in the early 1930s, but were never enacted; more temporary buildings were added in 1937.

=== 1944–70: Postwar expansion and abolition of fees ===
The Education Act 1944 made secondary education available to all children up to the age of 15 and abolished fees for state-schooling. Under the act, a "tripartite system" of secondary schooling was established to provide curricula based on aptitude and ability: grammar schools for "academic" pupils, secondary moderns for practical studies, and technical schools for science and engineering. Pupils were allocated to them depending on their score in the eleven-plus examination. As a result, KSHS catered for girls of secondary school age only and formally became a grammar school; it wound down its preparatory school (and the last boys departed) during the mid-1940s, and the County Selection Examination was used for all admissions. Early plans envisaged the school being rebuilt at Westholme, parkland owned by the county council off Westgate, but this never came to fruition.

To accommodate more children, temporary buildings were added in 1946–47. By the early 1950s, there were 330 pupils and 20 staff at the school. In the mid-1950s, the school purchased land behind the schoolhouse using funds raised through donations; these became the school's playing fields, and were officially opened in 1962. In 1956, the school acquired the disused and mostly dilapidated offices of Sleaford Urban District Council on Jermyn Street, adjoining their Southgate site. A major building programme began at the Jermyn Street site in 1957 across three phases; the work removed most of the offices and much of the temporary accommodation, and added modern buildings. These were finished in 1967–68. By 1971, the school had 430 girls on roll; this had risen to 534 by 1977.

=== 1970–79: Comprehensive schools debate ===
The educational opportunities for secondary modern pupils were limited compared to those at grammar schools, prompting criticism of the tripartite system. A reluctance to improve secondary moderns or expand grammar schools under the Conservatives prompted the Labour Government to issue Circular 10/65 in 1965, which requested local education authorities convert to a comprehensive system. Kesteven County Council drew up plans in 1970 for rolling out comprehensive education in the Sleaford area. This scheme proposed converting Carre's and the High School to coeducational comprehensive schools (for 11–18 year olds), abolishing the secondary modern to be abolished, and turning the site at Westholme (home to the secondary modern) into both schools' playing fields. In 1971, Sleaford parents voted in favour of comprehensive education in principle, but rejected the council's proposals. New plans were unveiled in 1973: the High School and the Secondary Modern sites were to become mixed 11–16 schools, and Carre's would become a sixth form college. Parents voted for the plans (1,199 to 628) with a 50% turnout. The County Council approved them, but allowed governors a veto. Following negotiations with governors at Carre's, the scheme was revised in 1974 so that Carre's and the High School would become 11–18 schools; the secondary modern would be closed, its site at Westholme absorbed by KSHS.

Despite support from most staff and all three headteachers, the new Lincolnshire County Council voted to return the scheme for further consultation in January 1975, a move the Sleaford Standard called "politically motivated". Two of the leading opponents, councillors Eric Fairchild and Reg Brealey, were governors at the secondary modern and Brealey was a former pupil there. He proposed a three-school system, arguing it offered more choice: the secondary modern would be consolidated at Westholme as a single-site 11–16 school; Carre's and the High School would also take 11–16-year-olds and operate Sixth Forms. Fairchild argued that this would be more popular and cheaper. The Education Act 1976 made it a duty on local authorities to "have regard to the general principle that ... education [they provide] is to be provided only in schools where the arrangements for the admission of pupils are not based ... on selection by reference to ability or aptitude", and it empowered the government to compel local authorities to prepare comprehensive schemes for their schools. After the Government ordered the council to submit a comprehensive proposal in 1977, it voted to submit the three-school system, which had become popular with parents and was championed by Brealey, who had become chairman of the Governors at the Secondary Modern. But, the Labour Education Secretary, Shirley Williams, dismissed the proposals in 1978 on grounds that the Sixth Forms would be too small. The council then voted against the two-school system again.

=== 1980–2010: Consolidation and expansion ===
In the 1979 general election, Margaret Thatcher's Conservative government came to power and shortly afterwards it repealed much of the Education Act 1976 and thus allowed local authorities to retain grammar schools (where they still existed) through the Education Act 1979. In Lincolnshire, the Council shifted focus towards retaining its remaining grammar schools (including KSHS) and improving schools where work had been put on hold during the comprehensive debate; despite 90% of English councils adopting comprehensive education, Lincolnshire had resisted. In 1983, the three Sleaford schools launched a formal collaboration called the Sleaford Joint Sixth Form wherein pupils would remain officially based at one school, but could enrol on sixth form courses offered at any of the schools in the consortium. This was to enable the widest range of choice in courses.

In 1994, the County Council commenced a £2m programme of refurbishment and building at KSHS, including the addition of a new teaching block and sports hall and a new music block, which all officially opened in 1996. The school's roll expanded sharply afterwards, rising from 560 in 1996 to 721 in 1999. Another new block housing a library and classrooms was opened in 2006. KSHS became a specialist visual arts college in 2003 and a training school in 2008.

=== 2010–present: departing from the joint sixth form, academy conversion and takeover ===
KSHS left the Sleaford Joint Sixth Form in 2010. The chair of the governors, Geoff Hotchkin, was quoted saying that this was because St George's College of Technology (the secondary modern school's successor) had converted to an academy, which meant that KSHS "cannot legally enter into any formal agreement with them." However, the Sleaford Standard reported that KSHS withdrew after "a series of talks" and quoted the Carre's headteacher Nick Law as saying he was disappointed that KSHS "fe[lt] they ha[d] to pull out". The Lincolnshire Echo reported that "it is thought that the high school wanted out of the joint status because it wants to raise entry level grades to drive up attainment."

KSHS converted to an academy the following year; it officially closed on 31 October 2011 and reopened on 1 November 2011 as Kesteven and Sleaford High School Selective Academy. The following year, the Sleaford Target reported that the headteacher, Craig Booker, was proposing to introduce "an adjusted staffing structure" in anticipation of changes to the school's funding. Later in 2013, eight members of staff were made redundant; the trade union UNISON reported that "substantial changes" were being introduced to some other staff members' pay and working practices. Booker defended the decision saying that the school would "need to become as efficient as possible in their use of public funding".

In 2014, the governors of Carre's Grammar School announced their intention to bid for conversion to a multi-academy trust and become a coeducational selective school on a new site; in February 2015, Kesteven and Sleaford High School announced its intention to join the proposed trust, a move welcomed by Carre's. On 1 September 2015, the school officially became part of the Robert Carre Multi-Academy Trust (RCT), which would see the schools operate on their sites sharing staff and facilities. At the same time, KSHS's chair of Governors, Robin Baker, became a trustee prompting his replacement as chair by Deborah Hopkins; the headteacher, Booker, stepped down that summer. In 2016, KSHS rejoined the Sleaford Joint Sixth Form. In 2025, the RCT merged into the Community Inclusive Trust, which took over the management of KSHS and Carre's Grammar School.

== School structure ==
Kesteven and Sleaford High School is a selective secondary school and Sixth Form serving pupils aged between 11 and 18. It converted to an Academy on 1 November 2011 without sponsorship. (Note: Being an Academy means that it receives funding directly from central government rather than a local education authority, and is run by a trust on behalf of the government; until 2010, Academies needed sponsors who were required to provide at least £2m towards it.) It was run by the Kesteven and Sleaford Academy Trust until 2015, when it was taken over by the Robert Carre Multi-Academy Trust (RCT); (Note: Registered with Companies House as a private limited company by guarantee without share capital; the registration number was 07804308.) in October 2025, RCT merged with Community Inclusive Trust, which took over the management of KSHS. The school operates on a single site at Jermyn Street in Sleaford. There are 98 staff as of 2024; there is the full-time equivalent of 45.57 teachers, 4 senior leaders and 5.25 teaching assistants.

Since the Education Act 2002, secondary school pupils have been placed in Years 7, 8 and 9 (grouped into Key Stage 3) and Years 10 and 11 (grouped into Key Stage 4), which coordinates how the National Curriculum is taught. On admission, pupils at KSHS are placed into tutor groups, with a teacher assigned as form tutor to provide pastoral support. Each year group also has a head of year with responsibility for the students in that year. Pupils are organised into houses based on their forms. The houses are named after wapentakes in Lincolnshire: Aveland, Flaxwell, Loveden and Winnibrig; house competitions and events take place across the school year. (Note: A house system has existed since the school's early days, when the first houses were named Green and Yellow, after the school colours. They competed in sports events and later academic house contests for a trophy donated by E. Godson. In 1923 the growing school roll led to Red and White houses being instituted. In c. 1948, the system was reorganised by the school council so that six houses, named after prominent Lincolnshire families, were created: Brownlow (yellow), Cracroft (green), Dymoke (purple), Heneage (blue), Thorold (white) and Whichcote (red). These were run by pupil House Captains and their deputies until 1973, when staff took over their organisation.)

Along with Carre's Grammar School and St George's Academy, KSHS is part of the Sleaford Joint Sixth Form, which was founded in 1983. It provides a common timetable across school sites and allows for pupils to choose from A-Level options offered at all three schools. Pupils may apply to be based at any one of the schools, where their pastoral and tutorial activities take place.

=== Pupil population ===
KSHS is smaller than the average English secondary school. It has a maximum capacity of 822 pupils; as of 2024, the student body is made up of 763 pupils aged between 11 and 18. The school admits girls for Years 7–11 and has a coeducational Sixth Form. As of 2024, girls make up over 99% of the school population. The annual intake to Year 7 will be 124 for the 2025–26 school year. While many pupils live in Sleaford and walk to school, others are drawn from as far as Newark-on-Trent and Lincoln. Transport is arranged by Lincolnshire County Council.

The last full Ofsted inspection of the school in 2013 reported that the majority of pupils were White British; as of 2024, 3.0% of pupils spoke English as a second language, far below the national figure (18.1%). As of 2024, 7.7% of the pupils had been eligible for free school meals (FSM) in the previous six years (compared with 27.7% nationally); when assessed by Ofsted in 2013, the inspectors reported that the proportion of students receiving FSM, disabled students and pupils with special educational needs (SEN) are all "much lower than the national average", though in 2024 12.5% of pupils receive SEN support which is in line with the national average. Absence rates are well below the national average.

=== Admissions ===
Admission to Years 7 to 11 at KSHS is selective. KSHS states that it accepts girls in "the top 25% of the ability range". For entry into Year 7, prospective pupils sit the eleven-plus examination to assess aptitude; the test procedures are set by the school. Prospective students resident in Lincolnshire apply in accordance with Lincolnshire County Council's admissions arrangements. Those from other areas apply through their own local authority. The Governance Tier of KSHS is the school's admissions authority. If the school is oversubscribed, eligible applicants with an Education, Health and Care Plan will be allocated places first. The remaining applicants who passed the eleven-plus threshold would then be admitted in the following order: looked after children, pupils registered for the Pupil Premium (i.e., those who have received free school meals in the previous six years), and students who have a sibling at a school in the Robert Carre Multi-Academy Trust; any remaining places are then allocated according to the proximity of the pupil's home to the school. In cases where it is not otherwise possible to distinguish between two applicants but not enough places remain to make offers to them both, a lottery will be drawn. There is a statutory appeals procedure organised by the local authority and run by an independent panel whose decision is binding on all parties.

Pupils applying mid-year in Year 7 who have not previously sat the eleven-plus can arrange to sit it. Pupils who did not meet the minimum eleven-plus score on their first sitting (either in Year 6 or mid-year in Year 7) cannot reapply until Year 8 or later. Prospective pupils in Years 8 to 11 must sit the nationally standardised cognitive ability test (CAT) for their age range (this includes verbal, non-verbal, quantitative and spatial elements). Applicants must be within the top 25% of ability in their cohort in the CAT to be eligible for a place.

Entry into the Sixth Form (Years 12 and 13) at KSHS has minimum GCSE requirements but there is no admissions test.

=== School uniform ===
For pupils in Years 7 to 11, the school uniform consists of a green blazer embroidered with the school badge; a pleated skirt in a variation of the Gordon tartan prescribed by the school or plain grey trousers; either a shirt with a collar (which must be worn with a school tie) or a revere-collared white blouse (worn without the tie). Formal plain black shoes are compulsory; they are worn with either black or green tights or black or green ankle socks. A black V-neck jumper can optionally be worn under the school blazer. (Note: Before the introduction of the current uniform in the late 2000s, the school uniform consisted of a bottle green plain skirt, a green and white striped short-sleeved blouse (for Years 8 to 11) or a lemon-yellow short-sleeved polo shirt (for Year 7), and a V-necked school jumper embroidered with the school logo; between October and Easter, girls could wear bottle green or black trousers instead of the skirt. When the current uniform was introduced, students could only wear trousers in Terms 5 and 6 (the summer) terms; in those terms, they could also wear a short-sleeved white blouse with the school logo embroidered on it.) Sixth formers are required to wear "smart" formalwear, which can include a suit with a shirt and tie; a formal jacket with skirt or trousers and a blouse or top; and a formal jacket and dress. In any case, smart shoes must be worn and all sixth formers at Sleaford Joint Sixth Form are issued with a lanyard which must be worn on the school premises.

== Curriculum ==
=== Key Stages 3 and 4 ===
The school follows the National Curriculum in Years 7–11 and offers a range of GCSEs (national exams taken by pupils aged 14–16), A-Levels (national exams taken by pupils aged 16–18) and vocational equivalents. Pupils participate in a number of educational visits throughout their school career (including trips abroad) and Year 12 pupils are offered the opportunity to participate in a work experience programme.

For Key Stage 3 pupils, the curriculum comprises art, computing, design and technology (incorporating food technology, textiles and graphics), drama, English, ethics and philosophy (EP), French, geography, German, history, mathematics, music, physical education (PE), science, and a personal development programme incorporating personal, social and health education (PSHE).

In Key Stage 4 (Years 10 and 11), pupils study a core curriculum comprising English, mathematics, science, PE, EP and PSHE. Students are required to take GCSEs in English language and literature, mathematics, science, either French or German, history and/or geography, EP, and two further subjects. For science, students are entered into either a combined "double" award equivalent to two GCSEs or a "triple" award (individual GCSEs in biology, chemistry and physics). (Note: 66% of pupils at KSHS were entered for the triple science award in 2023, compared to the national average of 26%.) As of 2024, the school offers optional GCSE courses in business studies, computing, drama, fine art, food technology, graphics, music, PE, and textiles; pupils must take one of four pre-determined combinations of these options.

=== Sixth Form ===
The Joint Sixth Form allows pupils to choose from around 60 vocational or academic subjects including (as of 2024): A-Levels in biology; chemistry; computing; design engineering; drama; English language and/or literature; French; history; geography; German; fashion and textiles; law; mathematics; further mathematics; media studies; philosophy, ethics and religion; photography; physical education; physics; product design; psychology; sociology and Spanish. There are also BTEC/CTEC options in applied science; art; photography; business; computing; performing arts; and travel and tourism; as well as other diplomas or certificates in bricklaying, carpentry, childcare, early years practice, health and social care, hospitality, physical education and uniformed services.

=== Examinations ===
The government's Progress 8 score measures how far pupils at the school progress academically between Key Stages 2 and 4 compared with pupils across the country with similar results to them. The score for KSHS in 2023 was "well above average" (0.55, with a confidence interval between 0.30 and 0.80), meaning that pupils do far better than those with similar previous attainment nationally. That year, 90% of pupils attained GCSEs in English and mathematics at grade 5 or higher (equivalent to a high C or low B in the old grading system); this compared with 45% nationally. Its Attainment 8 score (measuring how well pupils scored in eight subjects including English, mathematics, three English Baccalaureate subjects and three other approved subjects) was 65.6%, compared with 46.3% nationally. In 2023, 61% of pupils achieved the English Baccalaureate at grade 5 or above, compared with 17% nationally. Owing to changes in the school league tables, it is not possible to compare this directly with cohorts before 2017; in 2013, 93% of pupils achieved five GCSEs at grade A*–C including English and Maths (a key benchmark at that time), the fourteenth-highest percentage in the county (out of 96 schools).

The average A-Level result was a B grade in 2023, compared with a B− grade nationally. The average grade for all academic qualifications was a B (compared with a B− nationally); for applied general qualifications, the average grade was a Distinction, higher than the national average of a Merit+. In 2023, 28.6% of pupils achieved at least 3 A-Levels at grades AAB or higher including at least two "facilitating subjects", compared with 15.8% nationally. Of pupils completing Key Stage 5 in 2021, 96% stayed in education or employment for at least two terms thereafter; this was above the national figure (83%). The government produces a progression score for leavers who completed Level 3 study, which looks at the proportion of them that go on to study at Level 4 or above, taking prior attainment into account. For KSHS's 2020 leavers, the progression score was "average" (-1 with a confidence interval of 10 to -12). 83% went on to study at higher education institutions; 27% were at Russell Group universities and 2% at the University of Oxford or the University of Cambridge; this compares to 64%, 20% and 1% nationally, respectively. No Level 3 leavers in that cohort completed higher apprenticeships.

== Extra-curricular activities ==
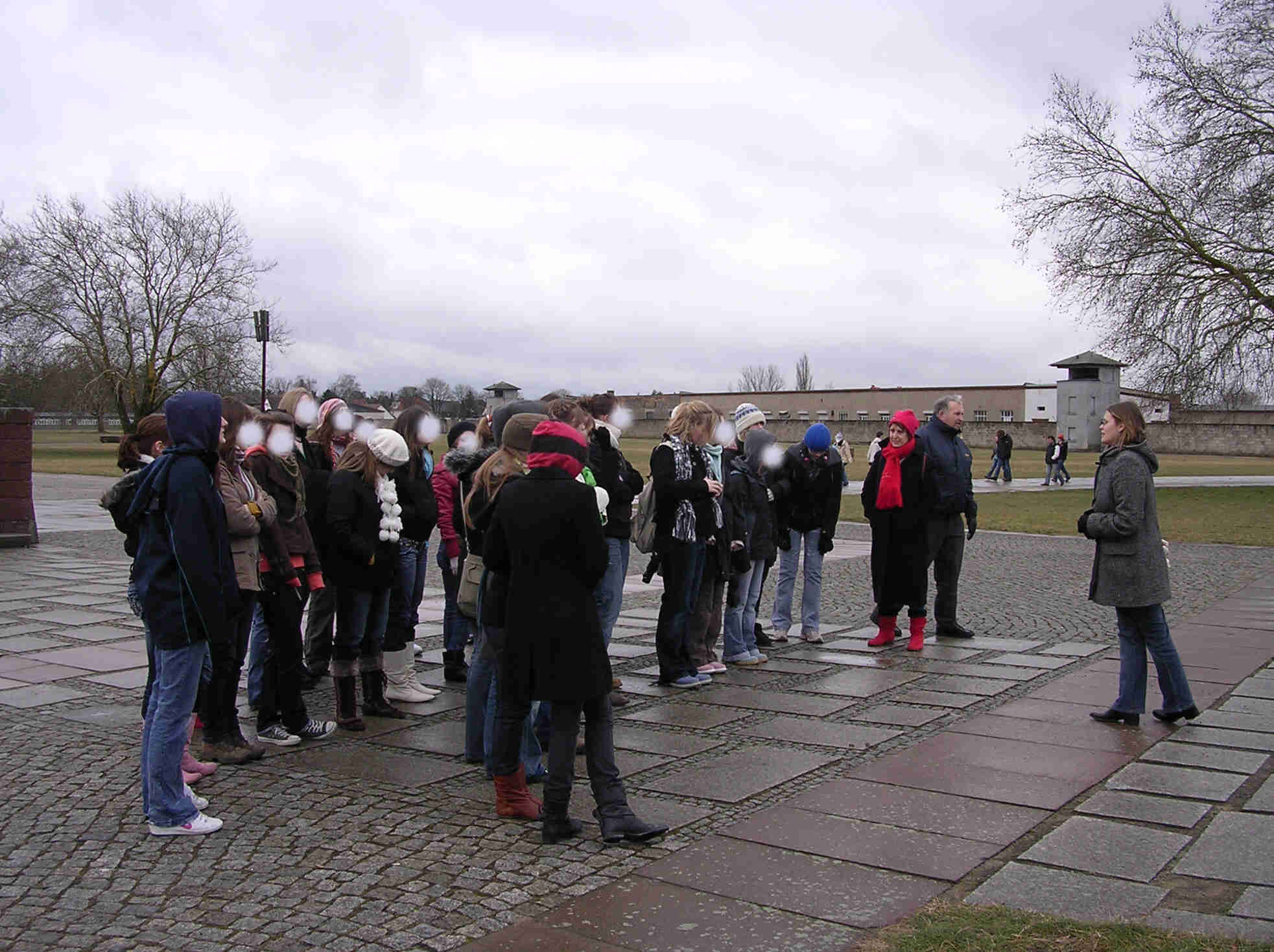
Year 11 Kesteven and Sleaford High School students visiting Sachsenhausen concentration camp during the February 2007 History trip to Berlin

School clubs and societies include librarian club, public speaking club, technology club, STEM club, the young journalists team, the arts award group, debating club and photography club. There is also a school council.

KSHS has a drama club, and since 1996 the school has put on an annual musical performance or a play. Drama had emerged in the school's extra-curriculars by the 1920s; among the earliest known student performances at KSHS was a rendition of She Stoops to Conquer in 1924, though drama did not become a regular fixture until 1934 when an inter-form competition was arranged by B. de L. Holmes, which carried on until at least the late 1970s.

From the very early years, the school also had cricket and tennis teams, who practised first in a field by King Edward Street and later at the town's cricket and tennis club grounds. In the 1920s and 1930s, sports days were conducted on one of Mr Coney's fields; alongside swimming lessons at Sleaford Swimming Baths, the school games were sports hockey, netball, tennis and stoolball (later replaced by rounders). By the 1970s, athletics and gymnastics were also a staple of sports education at the school. As of 2024, extra-curricular sports clubs include basketball, football, hockey, netball, tennis, badminton, volleyball, rounders, athletics, fitness, gymnastics and dance.

Since its inception, the High School has run regular field trips, including excursions to Lord Tennyson's birthplace in the Lincolnshire Wolds and trips to the coast in the early years. The second headmistress, F. M. Kirk, took girls on visits to the Lake and Peak Districts; outings to Paris and Stratford were smaller affairs, while a contingent travelled to the British Empire Exhibition at Wembley in 1924. Geography trips to youth hostels around Britain were regularly organised after World War II, and in the 1960s, the school participated in education cruises aboard HMT Dunera and took trips to Russia, France and the Netherlands. As of 2024, the school typically offers groups of pupils the opportunity to take part in a residential geography fieldwork trip to Norfolk (Year 7), foreign languages, history and geography trips to Germany (Years 8 and 11), history and foreign language trips to historic sites in France (Year 9), ski trips to the US and Europe (Years 10 and 11) and occasional trips to other countries arranged by the Sutton Trust (Years 10 and 11). Drama workshops and other trips are also offered, and since 1962 pupils have taken part in Duke of Edinburgh Award expeditions.

Girlguiding has a long history at the school. In the early 1920s, the school had two companies of girl guides, but after their captain, one Miss Gittings, left in 1925, the school groups were amalgamated with the town's company. The group was revived in 1955 as the 4th Sleaford Company led by one Miss Outram. The company was active throughout the 1960s and 1970s, although Outram became divisional commander in 1969 and Misses Hudson and Broughton took over the school's guides, which were split into four patrols. As of 2021, the 4th Sleaford Guides was still associated with the school and held weekly meetings.

== Sites and property ==
=== 62 Southgate ===
==== Charles Kirk's House ====
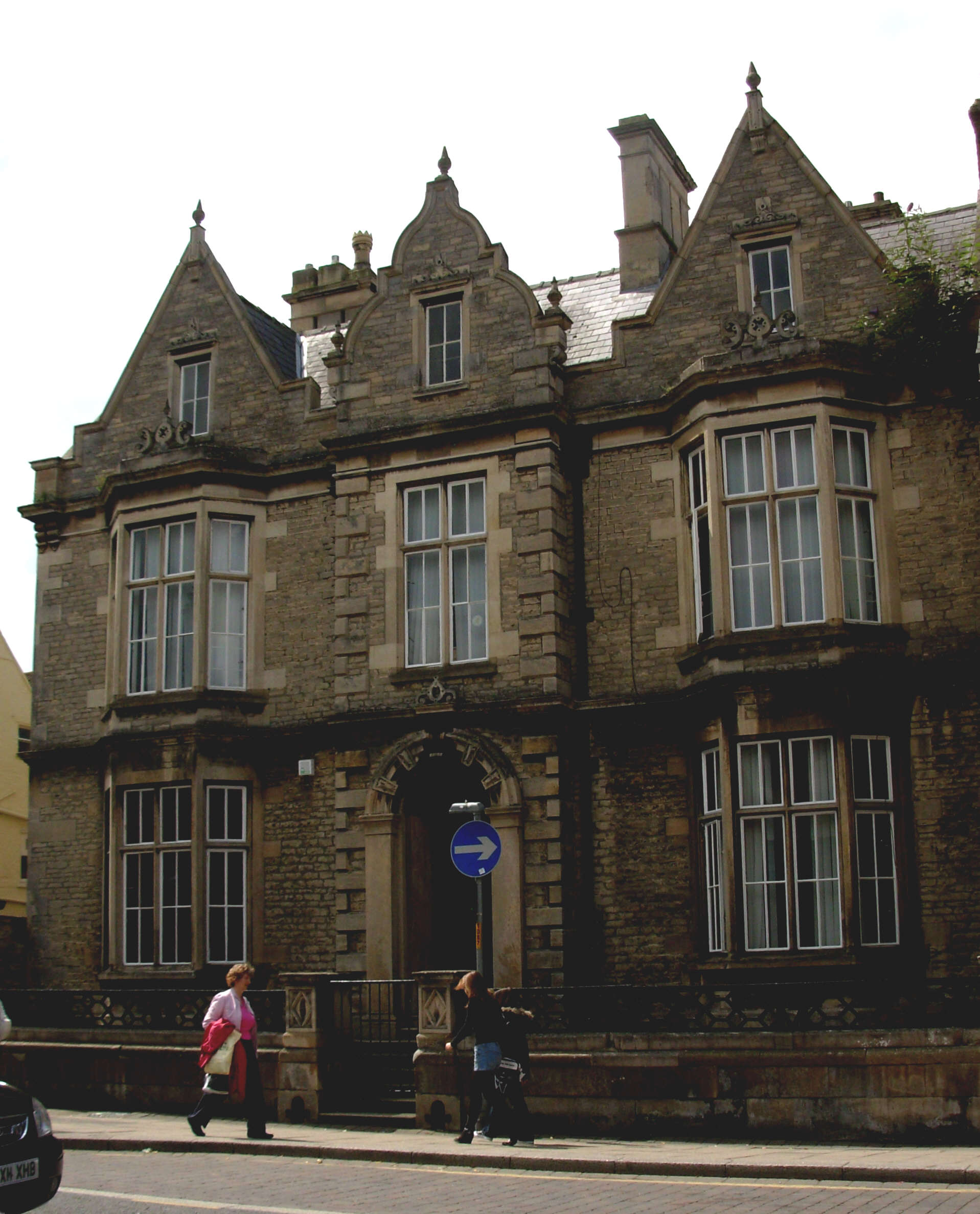
No. 62 Southgate, Sleaford, forming part of the campus of Kesteven and Sleaford High School.

The school's property includes 62 Southgate, a house that had been built by the prominent local contractor Charles Kirk for himself some time before c. 1850; the local historians Anthony Brand and Simon Pawley date it to 1842. Constructed to a Jacobean style, it has been grade-II listed since 1974. The stone house spans three storeys with three gables. Between canted windows on either side, the central section projects forward with quoins and includes an arched doorway with pilasters. Iron rails atop a stone wall separate the house from the street, and steps lead up to the doorway. Two pre-Conquest stone fragments, likely 11th century, are inlaid into a wall. In 1901, Kirk's house was purchased by the syndicate who went on to found Sleaford and Kesteven High School in 1902.

When the school opened, it operated out of Kirk's house. The main room for juniors overlooked the house's long gardens which had been laid out as croquet and tennis lawns. The kindergarten room overlooked Southgate and doubled as the dining room, while the senior pupils occupied a room upstairs set up for 11 pupils. The headmistress, assistant mistresses and boarders also lived in the building. A dining room and dormitory for boarders were added to the original house c. 1904, and the house was extended again in 1927. After the Second World War, the school's preparatory department closed and it ceased to take boarders, so parts of the house were gradually converted into classrooms and a library; the latter was funded by public donations, and opened in 1949.

By the 1990s, the building had been converted into a Sixth Form study area and music classrooms, but part of it was deemed to be a fire hazard. In 1999, the ground floor was made safe using a grant from the New Deal for Schools fund and the school fundraised to refurbish the building. It was officially reopened as a new Sixth Form learning centre in September 1999, with three art rooms, three study rooms, six classrooms, 20 computers and two offices for staff. The third floor was still disused at that time, though the school continued fundraising efforts to renovate it.

==== Former buildings in the grounds ====
By 1904, a brick building had been added to the site at the end of the house's garden, adding four classrooms, a music room and a cloakroom. (Note: By 1909, the company had spent £743 14s 10d on erecting classrooms, £278 3s on adding a dining room and dormitories to the original house, and £54 in erecting a music room.) These were supplemented in 1920 by wooden huts which provided an office for the headmistress, a biology room, an assembly hall, a cloakroom and three classrooms. Two brick rooms were added in 1924, the garden path was covered in 1929, and another wooden classroom was added in c. 1930; more temporary buildings were added in 1937. To accommodate KSHS's growing roll, the playground and netball pitch were replaced by prefabricated concrete blocks containing classrooms, a canteen and a kitchen in 1946–47. In the late 1960s, a 60-ft-long swimming pool was added to the grounds of the original schoolhouse, with the cloak room of the house functioning as a changing room. The huts, temporary buildings and the swimming pool were removed in later building work.

=== Jermyn Street buildings ===
==== The first modern school buildings: 1957 to 1968 ====
In 1956, the school judged that it needed much more space. The offices of Sleaford Urban District Council on Jermyn Street (adjoining the Southgate plot) fell vacant and the county council acquired them for the school. The site included a wooden hut which was converted into three classrooms and a stone building which housed a prefects' room, a music room and an attic for storage. (Note: The Urban District Council had occupied the offices and depot on Jermyn Street between 1919 and 1955, except for the stone building which they only acquired in 1927, it having previously been the office of the clerk of Kesteven County Council from c. 1902 until KCC acquired Lafford Terrace in 1925. The council's accountant, collector and surveyor and their staff occupied a war hut dating from the First World War. The sanitary inspector and housing officer and their staff were housed in an office formerly used by the old waterworks department, while the clerk and members of his staff had occupied the stone building, which was originally the office of the contractors Kirk Knights. In March 1955, the council moved to Westgate House, on Westgate, coincidentally the house originally built for Mr Knight, one of the partners in Kirk Knights. While the High School took over the old hut and the stone building, the Sleaford detachment of the Royal Red Cross took over the sanitary department's office in 1956.)

A major building programme on the Jermyn Street site began in 1957 across three phases. The work removed most of the temporary buildings. In the first phase, the Council erected a single-storey block of science classrooms and laboratories on the site of disused air-raid shelters. For phase two, three classrooms were torn down; a second storey was added to the science block; and a dining hall, kitchen, a music room, administration area, reception, changing rooms, and sixth form facilities were built. The third phase took place in 1967–68, and included the addition of classrooms for eight subjects. (Note: The building work was originally costed at over £117,500 in 1961. Its funding was delayed by the Ministry of Education in 1962 after spending cuts were announced by the Chancellor of the Exchequer, but it was given approval in 1963 and works were scheduled to start in the 1964–65 year.)

The stone building was retained and was grade-II listed in 1992; probably built by Kirk and Parry, who had a mill at Jermyn Street, this coursed-stone building with Gothic Revival details was probably Kirk and Parry's architectural office. It has been converted into an annexe for KSHS. It consists of one storey and an attic, and the layout follows an L-shape. The eastern corner of the street front has a gabled plinth.

==== Later additions ====
In the early 1990s, the council purchased land formerly occupied by Moore's Coaches to the west of the modern school buildings as part of plans to build new facilities at KSHS. Beginning in 1994, the County Council funded a £2m programme of refurbishment and building at the school, including the addition at Jermyn Street of a new sports hall and a new teaching block with classrooms and technology rooms joined to the existing block by a corridor. The existing buildings were upgraded to include new IT and science rooms and a new music block. The brick swimming pool building, a prefabricated nursery and a boiler house were cleared in the scheme. The County Council were the architects and the work was carried out by William Wright and Son (Lincoln). The new building was officially opened in June 1996 by the Lord-Lieutenant of Lincolnshire, Bridget Cracroft-Eley, with the local MP Douglas Hogg also in attendance.

During construction of the new technology block, the council had planned to demolish a disused limestone stable block facing Moore's Yard but were prevented from doing so when the building was placed in a conservation area in 1996. In 2000, the school was given £150,000 of New Deal for Schools funding to renovate the old stable block and turn it into a drama space.

Another new block housing a library, three classrooms, a laboratory and office space was completed in September 2005 and officially opened in December 2006, when it was named after a former teacher, Jenny Cattermole. (Note: Cattermole was a PE teacher at the school before she died in 2000; her husband, John, taught at Carre's Grammar School until his death in 2011 and attended the opening of the building at KSHS.)

=== Playing fields ===
In the earliest years, the school used the garden at No. 62 Southgate as a sports lawn, but by the 1950s it was in need of more space. In 1952, as part of the school's golden jubilee celebrations, staff and pupils at the school proposed purchasing land behind the school house. Owned by British Railways (BR), the firm eventually agreed a price of £750; over a three-year period, the school raised the funds through donations from parents, staff and local people, though it took BR five years to sell the land. The playing fields were eventually purchased, laid out and opened in 1962.

== Headteachers ==
Years	Headteacher	Notes
1902–1909	Margaret Kathleen Lewer	Lewer had been second mistress at Lincoln High School before her appointment at KSHS in April 1902. She later married Rev. Arthur Geoffrey Douglas Capel (d. 1933), who had taught at Carre's Grammar School before being ordained a priest and serving as curate and vicar for a number of parishes. (Note: He was ordained a deacon in 1908 and priest in 1909 by the Bishop of Lincoln and served as curate of New Sleaford (1908–09), St John in New Clee (1909–10) and Saltash (1910–15). During the First World War, he was temporary chaplain with the Royal Navy, and afterwards served as vicar of St Genny (1918–24) and St Winnow with St Nectan (1924–33). From 1929 till his death, he had been rural dean of Bodmin. He accepted the vicarage of Brauncewell with Dunsby and Anwick in 1933, but died before being instituted.) In later life she lived at Woodlands, Mill Green, Ingatestone, Essex, where she died in 1962.
1909–1944	Frances May Kirk	A native of Lancashire, Kirk graduated from Owens College, Victoria University of Manchester, with a first-class Bachelor of Arts degree in 1902. She was assistant mistress at the Pupil Teachers' Centre, Nelson (1902–04), then principal at the Pupil Teachers' Centre in Altrincham; she was a lecturer at Cherwell Hall and vice-principal at Milham Ford School immediately before she became head at KSHS in 1909. She retired in 1944 and died aged 72 in 1951.
1944–1947	Mary Anderson Ruth Baynes (acting)	Baynes was the sister of Arthur Clifford Baynes. She was acting headmistress after Kirk's retirement and then retired herself at the end of the summer term in 1947. She died in London in 1960, aged 75.
1947–1971	Helen Elizabeth Vidal	Vidal had a Bachelor of Science degree from Bedford College, London, and trained as a teacher at the University of London Institute of Education. She started teaching in 1933 and taught mathematics at the Mount School in York (1937–44) and Watford Grammar School for Girls (1944–47) before becoming headmistress at KSHS. She retired as head in 1971 and died in 2002.
1971–1979	Ann Brooks	Brooks graduated from Southampton University with a Bachelor of Science degree in physics and applied and pure mathematics, and completed a certificate of education at the University of London. She taught at girls' grammar schools in Chatham and East Ham, before spending five years at St Paul's Girls' School in Hammersmith, and then two and a half years at State House Road Girls' School in Nairobi until she took up her post at KSHS in 1971. She left KSHS in December 1979 to become head of the Chelmsford County High School for Girls. She retired in 1989.
1980–1996	Neville William McFarlane	Raised in Brighton, McFarlane attended Varndean Grammar School and then Balliol College, Oxford, where he read French and German. After training to be a teacher in Oxford, he taught at Cranleigh School for a year and then spent six years teaching at Wolstanton Grammar School, before he moved to Carre's Grammar School to become head of languages in 1963. He was then deputy headmaster (1969–1980) at Carre's. He then took up the post of headteacher at the High School in May 1980 and remained there until his retirement in 1996. He received the British Empire Medal for his services to the community in 2014.
1996–2012	Alison Ross	A student of Lancaster, York and Warwick universities and the Open University, Ross taught in Oldham from 1982 to 1992, before spending four years as deputy headteacher at Lancaster Girls' Grammar School. She was head at KSHS between 1996 and 2012, but was on secondment as interim head at King's Lynn Academy between 2010 and 2011. Ross left KSHS in 2012 to become principal at Stanground College in Peterborough.
2012–2015	Craig Stewart Booker	Booker had been teaching at KSHS for 11 years before he was appointed head in January 2012. He had been a deputy headteacher at the school during that time and was acting head while Alison Ross was on secondment at another school. He resigned in 2015.
2015–present	Josephine Smith	Josephine Smith became Head of School after Craig Booker left in 2015. She had been deputy headteacher at KSHS since she joined the school in 2012.

== Alumni ==
=== Notable former pupils and teachers ===
KSHS has produced notable alumni in several fields. In academia, they include the sociologist Sheila Allen (née McKenny; 1930–2009), who was professor of sociology at the University of Bradford (1972–99) and president of the British Sociological Association (1975–77). She was among the first to use the concept of institutional racism and was also the first woman appointed to a professorship at Bradford. In the law, alumni include Air Vice-Marshal Tamara Jennings, OBE (née Quincey; b. 1973), who has been the Director of RAF Legal Services since 2018, and the barrister Deborah Bangay, KC (b. 1957). The actress and television personality Abi Titmuss (b. 1976) also attended KSHS.

Notable teachers include Guy de la Bédoyère (b. 1957), the Romanist and contributor to Time Team, who taught history and classical civilisation at KSHS from 2007 to 2016. The diarist Vere Hodgson (1901–1979) taught at the school in the interwar years.

=== Old Girls Association ===
The school has an Old Girls Association (OGA), which aims to help former students keep in contact and publishes a newsletter. The OGA also funds prizes for pupils and manages a fund, established by a bequest from the former headteacher Helen Vidal, to provide financial assistance to former pupils studying at university. The OGA is run by a committee which meets four times a year.
