= Sleaford Joint Sixth Form =

Sixth form consortium in Sleaford, England

Coordinates: 52°59′57.30″N 0°24′51.01″W

- Sleaford, Lincolnshire; England

Information
- Type: Sixth Form
- Motto: Choice – Opportunity – Success
- Established: 1983
- Local authority: Lincolnshire
- Department for Education URN: 132951 Tables
- Gender: Mixed
- Age: 16 to 18
- Enrolment: c. 800 (Note: The government does not routinely report total sixth form enrolment at SJSF or each school in the consortium, but their latest inspection reports stated that Carre's Grammar School had 227 sixth formers in 2023, Kesteven and Sleaford High School had 220 in 2013, and St George's Academy had 396 in 2015.)
- Website: https://sleafordjsf.org/

Sleaford Joint Sixth Form (SJSF) is a partnership in Sleaford, England, between Carre's Grammar School, Kesteven and Sleaford High School and St George's Academy. It enables sixth-formers based at them to study individual courses offered at any of the schools, giving students a choice of approximately 60 A-Level or Level 3 vocational courses.

After the Second World War, Sleaford had three secondary schools, each with sixth forms: the boys-only selective Carre's Grammar School, the girls-only selective Kesteven and Sleaford High School and the mixed secondary modern, Sleaford Secondary Modern School (the predecessor of St George's Academy). In the 1970s, the government encouraged and later mandated the local authority to replace this arrangement with a comprehensive system. Having three schools was deemed uneconomical so the government wanted the town to have two comprehensive schools with sixth forms or two comprehensives and a sixth form college; local councillors and many parents preferred to retain three schools with their own sixth forms. This caused a protracted controversy which only ended when Margaret Thatcher's government reversed the previous policy on comprehensive schools in 1979, allowing the town to retain its selective system and the three schools.

This arrangement left the town's schools with small, uneconomical sixth forms which limited options for students. From 1979, Carre's and the High School began informally coordinating their timetable, and from 1980 the local authority proposed formalising a collaboration involving all three schools. Each schools' governing body approved the plans, which were then signed off by Lincolnshire County Council in early 1983. They were rolled out in September 1983, with the sixth forms having a common timetable and sharing teaching. Initially having 200 students on roll, it expanded to almost 800 pupils by the late 2000s and went from having 19 course options in 1988 to over 40 by 2007. In 2010, the High School departed from the arrangement, and returned in 2016 after the school joined the multi-academy trust that manages Carre's.

Admission to SJSF does not require any aptitude testing, and there are minimum GCSE requirements. Pupils are legally registered at one school, and can study courses at any of the three schools and can access all their premises. At their latest inspections, Ofsted ranked each of the sixth forms in the consortia as "good". (Note: The latest assessments were in: 2023 for Carre's Grammar School, 2013 for Kesteven and Sleaford High School, and 2015 for St George's Academy.) As of 2023, the average A-Level result for Sleaford Joint Sixth Form students was a B− grade, which is the average grade nationally. In 2023, 18.9% of pupils achieved at least 3 A-Levels at grades AAB or higher including at least two "facilitating subjects". Of pupils completing Key Stage 5 in 2021, 91% stayed in education or were in employment or an apprenticeship for at least two terms thereafter; this was above the national figure (82%). 75% went on to study at higher education institutions; 26% were at Russell Group universities and 2% at the University of Oxford or the University of Cambridge.

== History ==
=== Background ===
The Education Act 1944 made secondary education compulsory for all pupils aged 11 to 15. It also abolished fees in state schools and introduced a "tripartite system" of secondary schooling which provided curricula based on aptitude and ability: grammar schools for "academic" pupils, secondary moderns for practical studies, and technical schools for science and engineering. Pupils were allocated to them depending on their score in the eleven-plus examination.

In Sleaford, the existing boys' school, Carre's Grammar School, had previously charged fees subsidised by funding from Kesteven County Council, while admitting some children funded by local authority scholarships. After the 1944 Act, it became a voluntary controlled grammar school under local authority management from 1945. The girls' school, Kesteven and Sleaford High School, had also charged fees while admitting some pupils with scholarships; it converted to being a state grammar school from 1945 as well. Both selected pupils based on performance on the County Selection Examination, the eleven-plus examination. The local authority-run Sleaford Council School was also split, with its senior department (catering for pupils aged over 11), becoming legally separate as the town's secondary modern school in 1945.

=== Debate: Two schools or three for Sleaford? ===
The educational opportunities for secondary modern pupils were limited compared to those at grammar schools, prompting criticism of the tripartite system. In 1965, the Labour Government issued Circular 10/65 requesting local education authorities implement comprehensive schooling. In 1970, Kesteven County Council proposed replacing Sleaford's three school selective system with two comprehensive schools. In 1971 Sleaford parents voted in favour of comprehensive education, but rejected the Council's proposals. New plans were unveiled in 1972–73: the High School and the Secondary Modern sites were to become mixed 11–16 schools and Carre's would become a sixth form college. (Note: The proposal involved the abolition of the eleven-plus examination and the establishment of five co-educational comprehensive schools at Sleaford Secondary Modern, Sleaford High, Ruskington Secondary Modern, Lafford High and Billingborough Secondary Modern, with Carre's being converted into a sixth form college.) Parents voted for the plans with a 50% turnout. The County Council approved them, but allowed governors a veto. Following negotiations with governors at Carre's, the scheme was revised in 1974 so that Carre's and the High School became 11–18 schools; the secondary modern would be closed.

Despite support from most staff and all three headteachers, Lincolnshire County Council (Kesteven County Council's successor body) voted to return the scheme for consultation in 1975. Two of the leading opponents, councillors Eric Fairchild and Reg Brealey, were governors at the secondary modern and Brealey was a former pupil there. The latter proposed a three-school system, arguing it offered more choice: the secondary modern would be consolidated at Westholme as a single-site 11–16 comprehensive; Carre's and the High School would operate Sixth Forms. The Education Act 1976 empowered the government to compel local authorities to convert their schools to comprehensive schemes. After the government ordered Lincolnshire County Council to submit a comprehensive proposal in 1977, it voted to submit the three-school system, but with each school having its own sixth form; this had become popular with parents and was championed by Brealey. The Labour Education Secretary, Shirley Williams, dismissed the proposals in 1978 on grounds that having three schools would make each too small to be viable. The council then voted against the two-school system again.

In the 1979 general election, Margaret Thatcher's Conservative government came to power and afterwards repealed much of the Education Act 1976 to allow local authorities to retain grammar schools where they still existed. In Lincolnshire, the Council shifted focus towards retaining its remaining grammar schools (including those in the Sleaford area).

=== Planning for a joint sixth form ===
During the comprehensive debate in the 1970s, central government had found that having three separate sixth forms in Sleaford would not be viable because each sixth form would be so small that it would "diver[t] ... teaching resources from the main school[s]" and "restrict [the] range" of A-Level courses that each could offer. Duplication of courses between the schools could also lead to inefficiencies. The county council was determined to maintain the existing system of schooling in Sleaford despite these issues.

In 1979, Carre's Grammar School and KSHS began working towards what the KSHS headteacher Neville McFarlane called "rationalisation" of the sixth form timetable. By the end of 1980, the two grammar schools were looking to create a common timetable. At that time, the council's education officers prepared a report for the council's schools sub-committee which asked it to consider putting these informal arrangements on a formal footing and involving Sleaford Secondary Modern School. The proposals were well-received, with the headteacher at the secondary modern arguing that a joint sixth form would widen choice and make sixth form provision in the town more economical. The heads of the 11 to 16 secondary modern schools in nearby Billinghay and Ruskington were also in favour, and hoped that it would enable more vocational courses to be taught in Sleaford as many leavers were having to take these courses at Lincoln or Grantham. In September 1981, the two grammar schools adopted a common timetable for their sixth forms, with some courses jointly staffed.

In July 1982, the county's education committee approved the principle of the three sixth forms working together, with the secondary modern expected to synchronise its timetable with the grammar schools from September 1983; the governors of the three schools were asked to approve those plans. By then, all three headteachers backed the proposal for a full joint sixth form. The governors approved the plans in October 1982. The schools sub-committee formally approved the joint sixth form plans in November 1982; they were then approved by the education committee in January 1983 and the full county council in February 1983.

=== Operation: 1980s to 2000s ===
The joint sixth form was in operation from the autumn of 1983. The arrangement allows for students to take sixth form courses at any of the three schools regardless of which one they are based at, maximising the options available to them, avoiding duplication and maximising efficiency in course provision.

A permanent employee, the director of studies, was made responsible for coordinating the joint sixth form. Lawrence Denholm ceased to be the director of sixth form studies in 1988 and was replaced by Peter Wheeldon in 1989, who was in turn succeeded by Gordon Kay, who held the post from 1993 until 2011.

When it opened, Sleaford Joint Sixth Form (SJSF) had approximately 200 pupils on roll. Its initial focus was on sharing teaching for "minority" A-Level courses (those taken by few pupils), to make them viable. By 1988, SJSF had 250 students on roll across the three schools and offered 19 courses, a high number of options relative to other parts of the county. By the mid 2000s, there were over 700 pupils in SJSF. Entry was planned to rise to 450 by 2008, meaning a total enrolment of 780 students. In 2007, they could choose from 37 A-Level options (including 4 applied A-Level courses), two BTECs, one diploma and nine Level 2 qualifications. The proportion of A-Levels at A or B grade increased from 35% in 2000 to 43% by 2007, with the proportion at A–C grade rising from 56% to 70% over the same period.

=== Membership changes: 2010 to 2016 ===
Kesteven and Sleaford High School departed from the joint sixth form from September 2010. The reason for their departure was not made clear, with the parties offering different justifications. Kesteven and Sleaford High School told the Lincolnshire Echo that when the secondary modern school's successor, St George's College Technology, converted to an academy it became legally impossible for the two schools to operate under the existing formal agreement together. The Sleaford Standard stated that the High School had decided to go its own way, quoting the headteachers from the other two schools, while the Echo reported that "it is thought that the high school wanted out of the joint status because it wants to raise entry level grades to drive up attainment."

In 2014, the governors of Carre's Grammar School announced their intention to bid for conversion to a multi-academy trust and become a coeducational, selective school on a new site; in February 2015, Kesteven and Sleaford High School announced its intention to join the proposed trust, a move welcomed by Carre's. On 1 September 2015, the school officially became part of the Robert Carre Multi-Academy Trust, which would see the schools operate on their sites sharing staff and facilities. In 2016, KSHS rejoined the Sleaford Joint Sixth Form.

== Structure ==
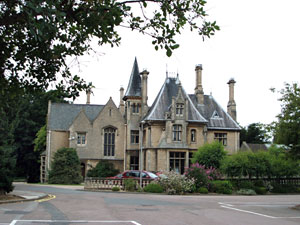
Westholme House, part of St George's Academy's Sleaford campus

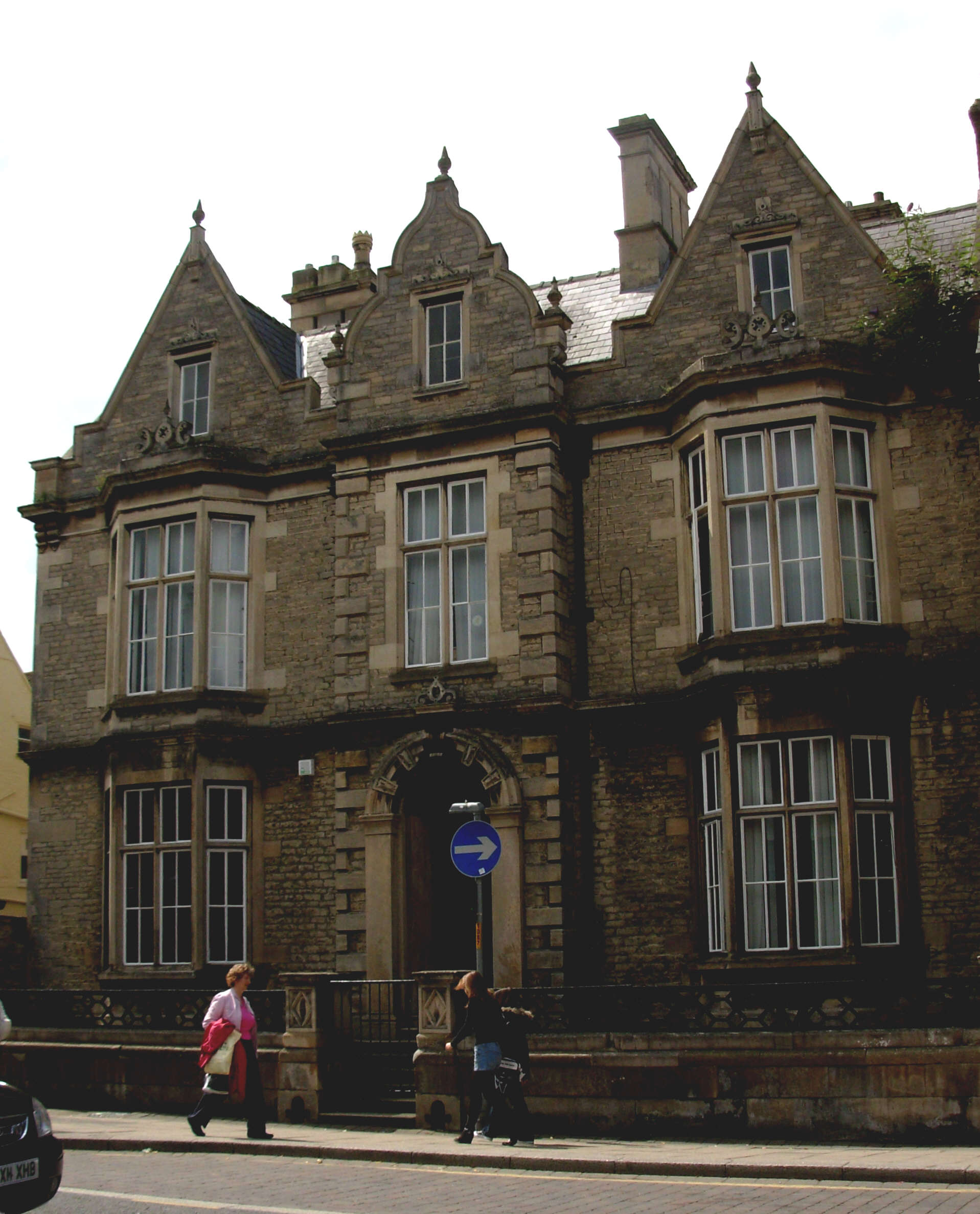
62 Southgate, which houses Kesteven and Sleaford High School's sixth form study area

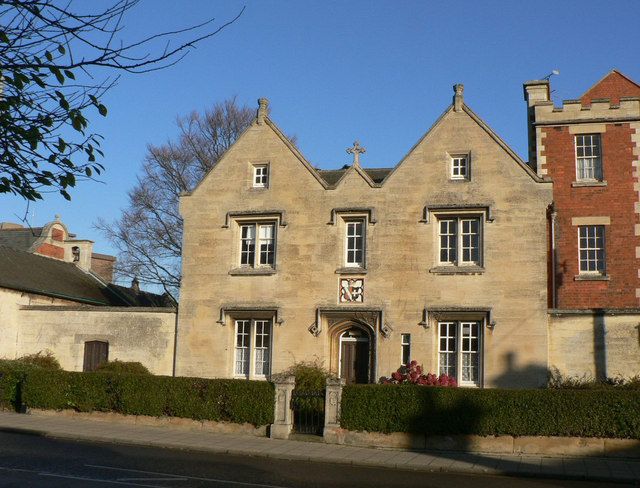
Victorian buildings at Carre's Grammar School

=== Operation ===
Sleaford Joint Sixth Form is a mixed gender sixth form centre catering for pupils aged 16 to 19. It is a collaboration between Carre's Grammar School, Kesteven and Sleaford High School and St George's Academy, underpinned by a formal agreement. Pupils are formally based at one of the three schools, where they are registered and have tutorial support, but the sixth forms at the schools share a synchronised timetable and pupils can chose to study courses offered at any of the schools. Sixth formers may make use of the facilities available at any of the SJSF sites, but the schools retain their own identities and extra-curricular opportunities. Until 2011, there was a director of the Joint Sixth Form, but as of 2024 each school has its own sixth form administrator.

The joint sixth form structure enables the schools to collectively offer a broad range of courses in an economical manner, while minimising timetable clashes and duplication of effort. It also means that popular courses, such as mathematics and English, can be taught differently at each school, allowing for a wide range of modules to be taken by students depending on their interests. Collaboration also allows schools to focus on their own specialisms without limiting their pupils' access to a wider choice of courses.

=== Admissions ===
The joint sixth form has been described as "effectively a comprehensive" because its members do not have aptitude tests or assessments involved in their sixth form admissions processes. Instead, pupils have to demonstrate minimum GCSE-level attainment, though the requirements depend on whether students opt to take an academic route or one of several vocational pathways. Individual courses may have additional requirements.

=== Dress code ===
The Joint Sixth Form has a dress code that applies across all sites. It states that students can wear a "smart, formal" suit with a shirt and tie; a "smart, formal" jacket worn with a blouse or top and a skirt or trousers; or a "smart, formal" jacket and dress. Smart footwear must be worn. In the winter, a jumper can be worn under the jacket and/or a coat over the jacket. When wearing a tie, students at Carre's are required to wear the prescribed school sixth form tie. All students have to wear a lanyard on site.

== Curriculum ==
=== Courses and learning support ===
The Joint Sixth Form allows pupils to choose from around 60 vocational or academic subjects including as of 2024: A-Levels in biology; chemistry; computing; design engineering; drama; English language and/or literature; French; history; geography; German; fashion and textiles; law; mathematics; further mathematics; media studies; philosophy, ethics and religion; photography; physical education; physics; product design; psychology; sociology and Spanish. There are also BTEC/CTEC options in applied science; art; photography; business; computing; performing arts; and travel and tourism; as well as other diplomas or certificates in bricklaying, carpentry, childcare, early years practice, health and social care, hospitality, physical education and uniformed services.

The schools offer transition packs for students moving from GCSE to A-Level as well as study guides for each subject.

=== Examination results and student progression ===
Because pupils remain legally registered at their base school, pupils results are logged against their base school and not the school where their teaching for individual courses takes place. The government publishes data about SJSF's collective academic performance. The average A-Level result was a B− grade in 2023, which is the average grade nationally. The average grade for all academic qualifications was a B− (compared with a B− nationally); for applied general qualifications, the average grade was a Distinction-, slightly higher than the national average of a Merit+; for T Levels, the average grade was a Distinction+, a full grade higher than the national average of a Merit+. In 2023, 18.9% of pupils achieved at least 3 A-Levels at grades AAB or higher including at least two "facilitating subjects", compared with 15.8% nationally.

Of pupils completing Key Stage 5 in 2021, 91% stayed in education or were in employment or an apprenticeship for at least two terms thereafter; this was above the national figure (82%). The government produces a progression score for leavers who completed Level 3 study, which looks at the proportion of them that go on to study at Level 4 or above, taking prior attainment into account. For SJSF's 2020 leavers, the progression score was "average" (−1 with a confidence interval of −6 to 4). 75% went on to study at higher education institutions; 26% were at Russell Group universities and 2% at the University of Oxford or the University of Cambridge; this compares to 64%, 20% and 1% nationally, respectively. 2% of leavers in that cohort went on to carry out higher apprenticeships.

== Extra-curriculars ==
The Joint Sixth Form also encourages sixth formers to undertake work experience and has said that "it is our intention to facilitate work experience for Year 12 students towards the end of the summer term." Extra-curricular activities, including sports, music, drama, volunteering, student voice and academic clubs are available through each school and are site-specific. In the early 2020s, teams from the SJSF attended meetings with Sleaford's MP Caroline Johnson, and took part in North Kesteven District Council's Question Time NK event, with the Heads of School Council from Carre's reviewing the event.

== Management ==
Between 1983 and 2011, SJSF had its own director (initially titled "Director of Sixth Form Studies"). The role was first advertised in May 1983 for appointment from autumn 1983. Initially, the role involved teaching at the three schools and liaising between staff, though it entailed far greater administrative and leadership responsibilities over time. After the introduction of a new governance structure in 2002, revised in 2008, the director's role included "clearly defined delegated responsibilities for the leadership and management of the collaboration ... [and] overall responsibility for the effectiveness of the curriculum [and] for ensuring that financial transfers between the schools are as small as possible". The director was also a member of the Joint Committee of Chairs of Governors, Vice Chairs and Heads, who coordinated the SJSF, and was chair of the steering group for headteachers, the curriculum, pastoral, exam and quality assurance teams. The last director, Gordon Kay, retired in 2011.

=== List of directors and directors of studies ===
| Years | Name | Notes |
|---|---|---|
| 1983–1988 | Lawrence Denholm | Denholm left his position as director of studies at SJSF in 1988 to take up the post of vice-principal at the Djanogly City Technology College in Nottingham (which opened in 1989). |
| 1988–1989 | John Charles Hodgson | Born in Stockton-on-Tees, Hodgson was educated at Darlington and graduated from Durham University with a BA in Classics. He qualified as a teacher in 1957 and taught at Stockton Grammar School and the Fryerns Comprehensive School in Basildon; he became acting head at several schools in Huddersfield before he was appointed headteacher at Sleaford Secondary Modern School in 1973. He was also the director of SJSF during the 1988–89 year. Hodgson retired as head at St George's College of Technology (the secondary modern's successor) in 1998. |
| 1989–1993 | Peter Leonard Wheeldon | Wheeldon started teaching in 1973 as a French and German teacher at a comprehensive school in Basildon. After being promoted to assistant head of the sixth form, he moved to a comprehensive school in Witham in 1979, where he spent five years as careers coordinator. From 1984 to 1988, he was head of the sixth form at the King's School in Gütersloh, Germany, a school for teaching the children of British armed forces personnel. Wheeldon became director of studies at SJSF in 1989 and was deputy headteacher at Carre's from 1993 to 1998 before serving as headteacher at Carre's from 1998 to 2003. |
| 1993–2011 | Gordon W. M. Kay | Kay was head of sixth form at Redhill School in Nottingham before he was appointed director of SJSF in 1993. He retired in 2011. |

== Bibliography ==
- Beauvallet, Anne (2015). "Thatcherism and Education in England: A One-Way Street?". Observatoire de la Société Britannique. 17 (17): 97–114. doi:10.4000/osb.1771.
- Edmonds, Kate; Venn, Elizabeth (1977), A School Remembers: Kesteven and Sleaford High School 1902–1977, Sleaford: Kesteven and Sleaford High School, OCLC 872093985
- Ellis, C. W. R. (1954), Carre's Grammar School: 1604–1954, Sleaford: W.K. Morton & Sons, OCLC 40597553
- Gross, Richard E. (1965), British Secondary Education: Overview and Appraisals, Oxford: Oxford University Press, OCLC 858036
- Harmston, Lloyd; Hoare, Douglas (2003), Carre's Grammar School Sleaford: 1604–2004, Lincoln: Tucann Design & Print, ISBN 978-1-873257-35-7
- HM Inspectors of Schools (1949). Report by HM Inspectors on Sleaford County Secondary School, Lincs. (Kesteven). London: Ministry for Education.
- Ofsted (2023), Inspection of Carre's Grammar School, London: Ofsted, archived from the original on 14 May 2024
- Ofsted (2013), Kesteven and Sleaford High School Selective Academy, London: Ofsted, archived from the original on 1 July 2022
- Ofsted (2015). St George's Academy. London: Ofsted. Archived from the original on 4 December 2023.
- Taylor, Cyril (2009), A Good School for Every Child: How to Improve Our Schools, London: Taylor and Francis, ISBN 978-1-134-01599-3
- Ward, Stephen; Eden, Christine (2009), Key Issues in Education Policy, London: SAGE Publications Ltd., ISBN 978-1-4462-4361-9
