= Ollie Chessum =

English rugby union player

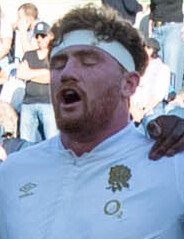
- Chessum in 2024
- Full name: Oliver Andrew Chessum
- Born: 6 September 2000 (age 26) Boston, England
- Height: 2.01 m (6 ft 7 in)
- Weight: 119 kg (262 lb; 18 st 10 lb)
- School: Carre's Grammar School
- Notable relative: Lewis Chessum (brother)

Rugby union career
- Position(s): Lock, Flanker
- Current team: Leicester Tigers
Senior career
| Years | Team | Apps | (Points) |
| 2019–2020 | Nottingham | 11 | (5) |
| 2020– | Leicester Tigers | 89 | (40) |
- Correct as of 1 November 2026
International career
| Years | Team | Apps | (Points) |
| 2022– | England | 30 | (25) |
| 2025 | British & Irish Lions | 3 | (0) |
- Correct as of 15 March 2025

Oliver Andrew Chessum (born 6 September 2000) is an English professional rugby union player who plays as a lock for Premiership Rugby club Leicester Tigers and the England national team.

== Early life ==
Born to Paddy Chessum and Michelle Chessum, Ollie Chessum is the eldest of 3 children. Chessum's younger brother Lewis also plays for Leicester Tigers and England's U20s.

Chessum began playing rugby at Carre's Grammar School in Sleaford at the age of 13, before playing club rugby for Sleaford, Newark and Kesteven. He was a member of Leicester Tigers "developing player programme" at 15 but gave up for a year as he found it unenjoyable. A year later he joined Kesteven RFC on the recommendation of his cousin and was selected as captain for England Counties Under-18s. He took part in a 6-week trial back at Leicester, but was injured in the second week and not offered a contract, instead he joined Nottingham.

== Career ==
Chessum joined Nottingham straight from school at 18 and impressed at the club making 11 appearances. In January 2020, Chessum featured for Leicester in a reserve team game, and then went on to join Leicester Tigers in the summer of 2020. He made his Leicester debut at Kingsholm against Gloucester on 30 August 2020.

On 20 November 2021, he was named as the Leicester Mercury's man of the match for his performance in a 55-7 Premiership Rugby Cup win against Wasps. Chessum started the 2021-22 Premiership Rugby final, and claimed a crucial loose ball to set up possession before Freddie Burns' 80th minute drop goal which sealed a 15–12 win for Leicester.

Chessum played in 14 from 17 games at the start of the 2021–22 season and his form saw him called up for the England squad for the 2022 Six Nations Championship on 18 January 2022, England coach Eddie Jones compared Chessum to Courtney Lawes, highlighting his lineout skills and his ball-carrying abilities. On 13 February 2022, Chessum made his England debut as a replacement in a 33–0 win over Italy in Rome.

Chessum played the first four games for the England in the 2023 Six Nations Championship, before dislocating his ankle in training ground accident in March 2023. On 7 August 2023, Chessum was named in England's squad for the 2023 Rugby World Cup. Chessum played in every game at the tournament as England finished 3rd, losing in the semi finals against South Africa but beating Argentina in the bronze medal match. Chessum returned to Leicester and featured in 13 games for the Tigers, he also played 5 times for England in the 2024 Six Nations Championship. He missed the final two matches of the 2023-24 Premiership Rugby season and England's summer tour to New Zealand to undergo a scheduled shoulder operation, after compressing his rehab for his ankle injury a decision was taken to not rush the rehab for the shoulder injury too.

Chessum captained Leicester for the first time on 21 September, in a 17–14 win away to Exeter Chiefs in the opening game of the 2024-25 Premiership Rugby season. In October 2024, Chessum was one of the first 17 players to sign a new "Enhanced Elite Player Squad" contract with the RFU.

In February 2025, he made his first appearance in the England starting lineup for over a year, replacing George Martin in the 2025 Six Nations fixture against Scotland.

In May 2025, he was selected for the 2025 British & Irish Lions tour to Australia as Lion #875 He played in all 3 tests. He was selected as a replacement for the first test in Brisbane, and third test in Sydney. He was selected to start the second test in Melbourne, to wear the number 5 shirt, where the Lions sealed the series victory.

On 23 September 2025, Leicester Tigers announced that Chessum would become club captain for the 2025-26 season, with Jack van Poortvliet and Hanro Liebenberg named as vice-captains.

== Career statistics ==
=== List of international tries ===
| No. | Date | Venue | Opponent | Score | Result | Competition |
|---|---|---|---|---|---|---|
| 1 | 12 February 2023 | Twickenham Stadium, London, England | Italy | 12–0 | 31–14 | 2023 Six Nations Championship |
| 2 | 7 October 2023 | Stade Pierre-Mauroy, Villeneuve-d'Ascq, France | Samoa | 5–0 | 18–17 | 2023 Rugby World Cup |
| 3 | 14 March 2026 | Stade de France, Paris, France | France | 17–15 | 48–46 | 2026 Six Nations Championship |
| 4 | 14 March 2026 | Stade de France, Paris, France | France | 38-39 | 48–46 | 2026 Six Nations Championship |
| 5 | 8 November 2026 | Twickenham Stadium, London, England | Australia | | 45–22 | 2026 Nations Championship |

as of 10 November 2026
