= Lewis Chessum =

English rugby union player (born 2003)

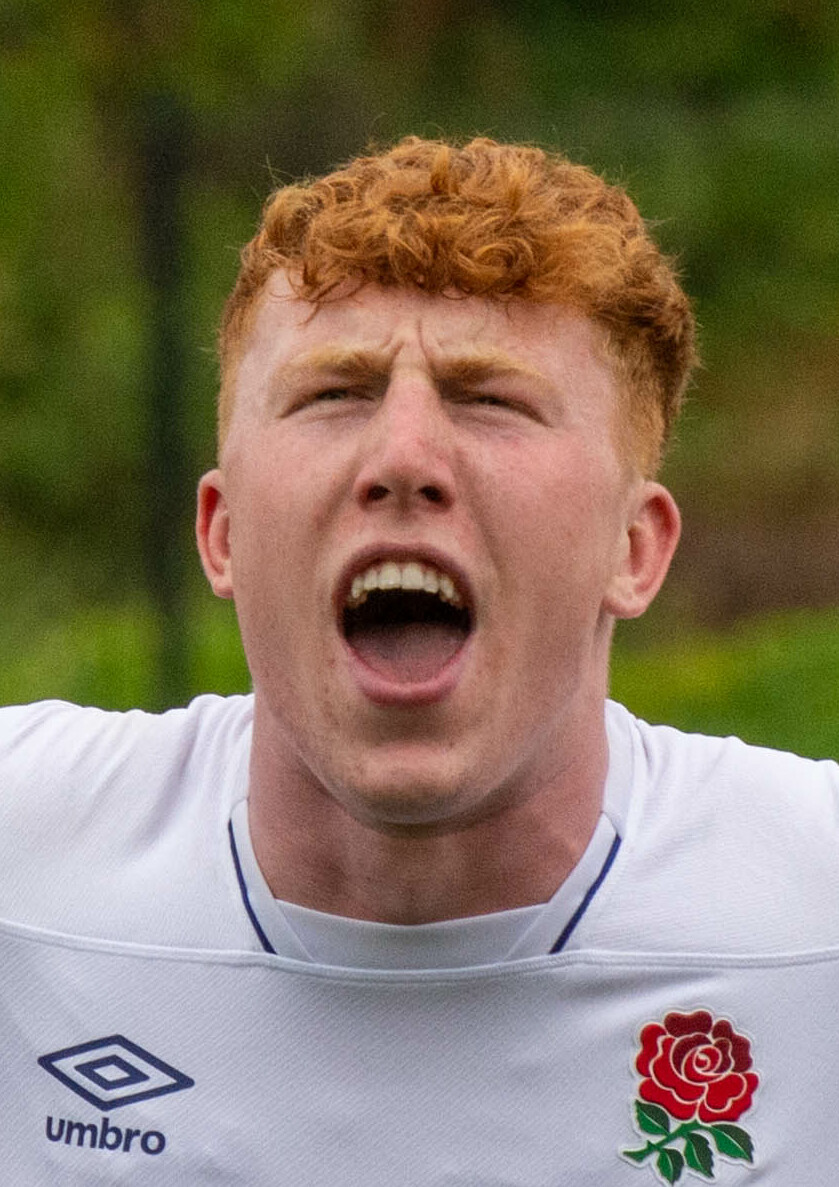
- Chessum in 2022
- Born: 27 February 2003 (age 23) Boston, Lincolnshire, England
- Height: 2.06 m (6 ft 9 in)
- Weight: 120 kg (18 st 13 lb; 260 lb)
- School: Carre's Grammar School
- Notable relative: Ollie Chessum (brother)

Rugby union career
- Position: Lock
- Current team: Leicester Tigers
Senior career
Years	Team	Apps	(Points)
2020-	Leicester Tigers	12	(5)
2020–2024	→ Nottingham (loan)	35	(10)
2025	→ Sagamihara DynaBoars (loan)	10	(0)
- Correct as of 10 May 2025
International career
Years	Team	Apps	(Points)
2022–2023	England U20s	17	(5)
- Correct as of 14 July 2023

Lewis Chessum (born 27 February 2003) is an English professional rugby union player. He plays as a lock for Leicester Tigers and has captained the England under-20 rugby union team. He has also played on loan for Mitsubishi Sagamihara DynaBoars in Japan Rugby League One.

== Early life ==
Chessum is from Lincolnshire, and was brought up in Aunsby, near Sleaford. He attended Carre's Grammar School in Sleaford.

== Career ==
Chessum started playing rugby at Sleaford RFC when he was nine years-old. He joined Leicester Tigers rugby academy as a teenager in 2019. Chessum plays in the second-row where he can utilise his 6'9" height. He made his debut for Leicester in the 2021–22 season, after a loan at Championship Rugby side Nottingham. He signed a new contract with Leicester in August 2022.

Chessum made his debut for England under-20s on 1 March 2022 in a win against Wales during the 2022 Six Nations Under 20s Championship. On 3 February 2023 he captained England under-20 for the first time in a 41–36 victory over Scotland under-20s. Later that year Chessum led the side to a fourth-place finish at the 2023 World Rugby U20 Championship.

On 29 January 2025, having made twelve appearances for the Leicester first-team, it was announced that Chessum had signed a new contract at Leicester, but was also joining Mitsubishi Sagamihara DynaBoars on loan for the 2025 season as part of a new "performance partnership" between the two clubs. He made his debut in Japan Rugby League One as a replacement on 1 February 2025, in a 12-40 defeat against Kubota Spears Funabashi Tokyo Bay.

== Personal life ==
He is the younger brother of England rugby union international Ollie Chessum.
