= Progress 8 benchmark =

Measure used to measure the quality of secondary schools in England

The Progress 8 benchmark is an accountability measure used by the government of the United Kingdom to measure the effectiveness of secondary schools in England. It bands pupils into groups based on their scores in English and mathematics during the Key Stage 2 SATs. In GCSE results, six EBacc subjects are chosen, in addition to English and Maths, and each grade is converted to points on an arbitrary scale published by the government for that cohort. English and mathematics are worth double points and all points are added together. This is also known as the Attainment 8 score.

There is an expected point score determined for each band of children, and the school is then ranked based on how their pupils' Attainment 8 compares with the expected score.

Progress 8 scores will result in a school being placed into a banded category: well above average, above average, average, below average and well below average.

== Context ==
Previously, schools would be judged on how many A*-C GCSEs it had achieved from the cohort. This had given advantage to schools in middle class areas, where Ofsted may more often judge those schools to be outstanding compared to schools in areas with higher levels of deprivation. Schools would target pupils on the C/D borderline to try to manipulate the statistics used by Ofsted to determine its judgement, with poor results risking a school being placed in special measures and forced into academy conversion.

Former Conservative Education Secretary Nicky Morgan believed the old system was unfair. Referring to the introduction of the new Progress 8 measure in a speech in January 2015, she said: “No longer will it be the case that the only pupils that matter will be those on the C/D borderline. Instead, those schools that will be rewarded are those that push each pupil to reach their potential.”

== Calculation ==
Legacy GCSE grade point equivalent (pre 2019)
Grade	2016 points	2017 points	2018 points
A*	8.00	8.50	8.50
A	7.00	7.00	7.00
B	6.00	5.50	5.50
C	5.00	4.00	4.00
D	4.00	3.00	3.00
E	3.00	2.00	2.00
F	2.00	1.50	1.50
G	1.00	1.00	1.00

- A KS2 attainment figure is obtained for the student. This will be taken from KS2 tests administered by the feeder primary school and modified into a numerical value.

- The Attainment 8 figure is a summation obtained for the student:
  - Basket 1: Maths and English results (these will be double weighted)
  - Basket 2: 3 subjects from the EBacc list
  - Basket 3: 3 GCSE qualifications (including EBacc subjects) or any other non-GCSE qualifications on the DfE approved list.

Eight subjects in all; this is the Attainment 8 figure

- Subtract (The Attainment 8 - KS2 attainment) giving the difference. Divide by 10. That is the result. A positive shows progress and a negative shows falling back.

From 2019, all GCSE results are given on a 1-9 scale (conversions applied prior to this). Changes in marking standards are being made concurrently.

=== Floor standards ===
The results from each student are added and divided by the number on roll (this is determined by the FdE and can be inaccurate.) This is the figure awarded to the school, and used in league tables. The floor standard where ministers intervene is set at -0.5. Schools achieving -0.25 are deemed to be coasting.

== Consequences ==
Progress 8 has been broadly welcomed as being a fairer method of assessing a school's achievement. However, it has received criticism for being based on the factory model of monitoring production, in which inputs and outputs are measured and the results used to push the workforce into increasing production. Some have argued that teachers as skilled professionals should not see their commitment and competence subject to market forces which narrow the meaning of education to examination results.

Analysis of the 2017 results has shown a degree of clustering. Out of the top 10 best performing schools, 7 of them were in London, and two in the town of Blackburn. Free schools are seen to have an advantage. The change in the grade mapping has had a disproportionate effect on schools with less able children. Students who are absent or even have been off-roll for a considerable time also adversely distort the figures, and this will be more significant with schools in difficult areas or with a larger number of less able children.

On a longer time scale, it skews the number and range of subjects that a school will offer. Its effect on arts subjects was predicted and change has occurred.

- It limits the number of timetable slots for arts subjects to four, but it does insist that one of these subjects must be an art giving a degree of protection and allowing schools that are already confident in the arts to continue.
- Certain trends have already been seen. There is a gender distinction in take up, with a north/south divide. There is a racial gap. The number of SEND pupils are increasing, reversing a trend, though the number of pupils on free school meals has marginally declined. EAL students and high achieving pupils are down. Over half of the full EBacc entrants do select one art, but the numbers are down.

=== Negative outliers adjustment ===
In 2018 it was recognised that a small group of low achievers could distort the results for a school, and these schools would be ones in low-achieving areas. The 2018 league tables are to be published with two Progress 8 results, one as in previous years and one with a negative outliers adjustment.
