= Cambridge Technicals =

Vocational qualifications

Cambridge Technicals are vocational qualifications, offered by Oxford, Cambridge and RSA Examinations (OCR) in the United Kingdom, and Cambridge International Examinations (CIE) internationally; both are part of Cambridge University Press & Assessment. These qualifications are intended for secondary school students age 16 to 18 who want to study a practical, work-related curriculum. In the UK's Qualifications and Credit Framework (QCF) a Tech Level 2 qualification is equivalent to a GCSE, and a Level 3 is equivalent to an A Level. The qualifications are designed with the workplace in mind and provide a high quality alternative to A Levels, supporting progression to higher education.

== Regulation ==
All Tech Level qualifications must meet criteria set by the UK's Department for Education (DfE) for all 'Applied General' qualifications, including the endorsement of five employers registered at Companies House. Tech Level qualifications must have:

- at least 300 guided learning hours
- mandatory content must make up at least 40%
- 30% external assessment
- one opportunity to resit (retake)
- three grading points or more, such as Distinction/Merit/Pass

== Change ==
In 2014 the UK government announced it would reform all vocational qualifications. By 2021 it was ready to set out its plan for vocational qualifications in England.

During the COVID-19 pandemic, OCR announced a series of adjustments it would make to support learners taking Cambridge Technicals.

== Subjects ==
The following subjects are offered:

- Applied Science
- Art and Design
- Business
- Digital media
- Engineering
- Health and Social Care
- Information Technology
- Media
- Performing Arts
- Sport and Physical Activity

== External references ==
OCR website
