= 1952 Kesteven County Council election =

1952 UK local government election

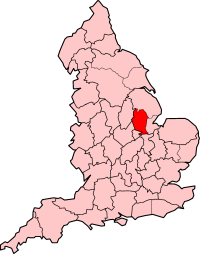
The administrative county of Kesteven (1889–1974), shown within England.

Elections to Kesteven County Council were held on Saturday, 5 March 1952. Kesteven was one of three divisions of the historic county of Lincolnshire in England; it consisted of the ancient wapentakes (or hundreds) of Aswardhurn, Aveland, Beltisloe, Boothby Graffoe, Flaxwell, Langoe, Loveden, Ness, and Winnibriggs and Threo. The Local Government Act 1888 established Kesteven as an administrative county, governed by a Council; elections were held every three years from 1889, until it was abolished by the Local Government Act 1972, which established Lincolnshire County Council in its place.

The county was divided into 60 electoral divisions, each of which returned one member. In 1952 there were contests in 13 of these, eight of which saw no change; Labour gained 4 seats.

== Results by division ==
Division	Candidate	Party	Votes	Retiring
Ancaster	R. W. Chadburn			r
Bassingham	W. D. G. Battersby			r
Bennington	F. Winter			r
Billingborough	Rev. L. R. Swingler	Ind	356	
Billingborough	Mrs C. A. Baker	Ind	207	
Billingborough	G. Sandall	Ind	103	
Billinghay	J. H. Brighton			
Bourne no. 1	H. L. Hudson			
Bourne no. 2	R. A. Collins			r
Bracebridge	Miss A. Rooke	Ind	390	r
Bracebridge	H. E. Hough	Lab	377	
Branston	W. E. Young			r
Bytham	J. H. Turner			r
Caythorpe	J. W. Oxby	Ind	483	r
Caythorpe	A. W. Gray	Ind	193	
Claypole	Brig. F. McCullum			
Colsterworth	J. D. Hind			r
Corby	The Earl of Ancaster			r
Cranwell	J. E. Mountain			r
Deeping St James	C. H. Feneley			r
Dunston	J. Ireson			r
Gonerby and Barrowby	J. E. Snell			
Grantham no. 1	A. E. Bellamy			
Grantham no. 2	W. Bevan			
Grantham no. 3	J. W. Harrison			
Grantham no. 4	K. H. Jennings	Lab	506	
Grantham no. 4	T. A. S. Branston	Lib	326	
Grantham no. 5	Mrs J. W. Browse	Con	356	r
Grantham no. 5	R. E. Burnett	Lab	432	
Grantham no. 6	Mrs A. S. Chantry	Lab	259	
Grantham no. 6	W. E. B. Read	Ind	151	
Grantham no. 7	A. E. Cooper	Ind	439	r
Grantham no. 7	D. H. Harrigan	Lab	335	
Grantham no. 8	Mrs D. Shipman	Con	337	r
Grantham no. 8	G. Waltham	Lab	208	
Grantham no. 9	M. W. Patterson	Lab	1076	
Grantham no. 9	H. Wright	Ind	741	
Grantham no. 10	C. J. Redmile	Lab	474	r
Grantham no. 10	Mrs L. M. Ward	Con	466	
Heckington	G. H. Dunmore			r
Helpringham	A. Burdett			
Kyme	E. L. Lamyman			r
Leadenham	Capt. H. W. N. Fane	Ind	293	r
Leadenham	P. J. French	Ind	231	
Market Deeping	F. W. Wade			r
Martin	J. F. Vickers			r
Metheringham	F. C. Townsend			r
Morton	A. F. Shaw			
Navenby	R. A. Mason			
North Hykeham	G. W. Hutson			r
Osbournby	Mrs N. Robson			r
Ponton	R. W. Newton			r
Rippingale	J. T. Emerson			r
Ropsley	Mrs J. P. Dixon			
Ruskington	A. J. Hossack			r
Scopwick	K. C. Irving			r
Skellingthorpe	R. C. Turner			r
Sleaford no. 1	E. W. Elmore			r
Sleaford no. 2	C. J. Barnes			
Sleaford no. 3	W. Middleton			r
Stamford no. 1	E. Ireson			r
Stamford no. 2	H. Skells			r
Stamford no. 3	Rev. J. D. Day			
Stamford no. 4	P. K. Banks			r
Stamford no. 5	A. E. Millett			r
Swinderby	P. W. Spray			r
Thurlby	G. A. Griffin	Ind	454	
Thurlby	A. W. Sharman	Ind	346	
Uffington	Rev. R. Burman			
Washingborough	G. H. Applewhite			r
Welby	Brig.-Gen. R. L. Adlercron			r
Wilsford	Col. W. Reeve	Ind	267	r
Wilsford	J. R. Shaw	Lib	223	
Woolsthorpe	F. Wright			r

== By-elections ==
=== Leadenham and Ruskington, May 1954 ===
Cllrs S. J. Edwards (Leadenham) and A. J. Hosack (Ruskington) resigned prompting elections in their divisions. Polling took place on 22 May 1954. The results for Leadenham were:

- Henry Pryor Kelway, chartered accountant and merchant, of The Green, Fulbeck (Independent), 336 votes
- Reginald Edgar Burnett, railway engine driver, of 29 Staunton St, Grantham (Labour), 329 votes

For Ruskington:

- Benjamin E. Brighton, farmer, of Ruskington (Independent), 843 votes
- Eric Arthur Skins, cook, of Ruskington (Labour), 245 votes

Hence, Kelway and Brighton were elected. The Leadenham electorate numbered 1,171, meaning the turnout was approximately 57%. The number of registered voters in Ruskington was 1,702, and the turnout was 65%.

=== Corby and Navenby, July 1954 ===
The elevation of the Earl of Ancaster (Corby) to the aldermanic bench, and the death of R. A. Mason (Navenby) prompted by-elections. Polling took place on 3 July 1954.

In Corby, the following candidates contested the election:

- John Hedley Lewis, of Corby, farmer – 392 votes
- Jack Manton, of Corby, electricity worker (Labour Party) – 276 votes
