= 1946 Kesteven County Council election =

1946 UK local government election

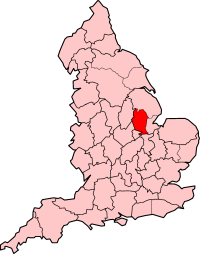
The administrative county of Kesteven (1889–1974), shown within England.

Elections to Kesteven County Council were held on Saturday, 2 March 1946. Kesteven was one of three divisions of the historic county of Lincolnshire in England; it consisted of the ancient wapentakes (or hundreds) of Aswardhurn, Aveland, Beltisloe, Boothby Graffoe, Flaxwell, Langoe, Loveden, Ness, and Winnibriggs and Threo. The Local Government Act 1888 established Kesteven as an administrative county, governed by a Council; elections were held every three years from 1889, until it was abolished by the Local Government Act 1972, which established Lincolnshire County Council in its place.

For the 1946 election, the county was divided into sixty wards, ten of which accounted for the town of Grantham, five for Stamford, three for Sleaford and two for Bourne. Only twenty-six were contested and most of these were in the towns: every seat in Stamford and Bourne and all but one in Grantham and Sleaford. The results were extremely close in two wards: in Sleaford no. 3 there was a tie, forcing the returning officer to cast his ballot; and in Corby, the difference between the two candidates was one vote. In summarising the result, the Lincolnshire Echo stated that "politics play little part in Kesteven County Council affairs"; this was true at least insofar that Labour was the only political party to contest any of the wards. Having won five seats, the remainder went to independent candidates.

== Results ==
=== Ancaster ===
Ancaster
Party	Candidate	Votes	%	±%
	R. G. Simpson	NA	NA	

=== Bassingham ===
Bassingham
Party	Candidate	Votes	%	±%
	W. D. G. Battersby	NA	NA	

=== Bennington ===
Bennington
Party	Candidate	Votes	%	±%
	F. Winter	518	85.9	
	T. L. Hopwood	85	14.1	
Turnout		603		

=== Billingborough ===
Billingborough
Party	Candidate	Votes	%	±%
	A. Wilson	NA	NA	

=== Billinghay ===
Billinghay
Party	Candidate	Votes	%	±%
	E. Gilbert	NA	NA	

=== Bourne no. 1 ===
Bourne no. 1
Party	Candidate	Votes	%	±%
	Rev. W. J. Rees	529	65.0%	
	W. Seaton	285	35.0%	
Turnout		814		

=== Bourne no. 2 ===
Bourne no. 2
Party	Candidate	Votes	%	±%
	R. A. Collins	400	58.6%	
	T. H. Wardale	283	41.4%	
Turnout		683		

=== Bracebridge ===
Bracebridge
Party	Candidate	Votes	%	±%
	Herbert E. Hough	362	65.5%	
	John Colton Hall	191	34.5%	
Turnout		553		

=== Branston ===
Branston
Party	Candidate	Votes	%	±%
	G. H. Johnson	NA	NA	

=== Brytham ===
Brytham
Party	Candidate	Votes	%	±%
	John H. Turner	NA	NA	

=== Caythorpe ===
Caythorpe
Party	Candidate	Votes	%	±%
	John W. Oxby	NA	NA	

=== Claypole ===
Claypole
Party	Candidate	Votes	%	±%
	John W. Milner	NA	NA	

=== Colsterworth ===
Colsterworth
Party	Candidate	Votes	%	±%
	James D. Hind	NA	NA	

=== Corby ===
Corby
Party	Candidate	Votes	%	±%
	K. King	223	50.1%	
	P. Adcock	222	49.9%	
Turnout		445		

=== Cranwell ===
Cranwell
Party	Candidate	Votes	%	±%
	John Taylor	NA	NA	

=== Deeping St James ===
Deeping St James
Party	Candidate	Votes	%	±%
	Charles H. Feneley	NA	NA	

=== Dunston ===
Dunston
Party	Candidate	Votes	%	±%
	Frank Clarke	NA	NA	

=== Gonerby and Barrowby ===
Gonerby and Barrowby
Party	Candidate	Votes	%	±%
	John E. Snell	NA	NA	

=== Grantham no. 1 ===
Grantham no. 1
Party	Candidate	Votes	%	±%
Labour	Montague Ogden	293	56.7%	
Independent	John William Joseph Sandall	224	43.3%	
Turnout		517		

=== Grantham no. 2 ===
Grantham no. 2
Party	Candidate	Votes	%	±%
Labour	Mrs. Lilian Basford	NA	NA	

Basford was elected Mayor of Grantham and became an alderman later in 1946, forcing her to vacate the seat. The Labour candidate Elizabeth Frances Bullimore was the only person nominated to replace her and so took up the seat in March 1947.

=== Grantham no. 3 ===
Grantham no. 3
Party	Candidate	Votes	%	±%
Labour	John William Harrison	350	69.6%	
Independent	Alfred Malcolm Hall	153	30.4%	
Turnout		503		

=== Grantham no. 4 ===
Grantham no. 4
Party	Candidate	Votes	%	±%
Independent	William Griffin	302	57.2%	
Labour	George William Ancliff	226	42.8%	
Turnout		528		

=== Grantham no. 5 ===
Grantham no. 5
Party	Candidate	Votes	%	±%
Independent	Gordon Foster	445		
Labour	Herbert Cant	407		
Turnout		852		

=== Grantham no. 6 ===
Grantham no. 6
Party	Candidate	Votes	%	±%
Independent	Frederick Leonard Preston	245		
Labour	Mrs Sarah Ann Barnes	226		
Turnout		471		

=== Grantham no. 7 ===
Grantham no. 7
Party	Candidate	Votes	%	±%
Independent	Colonel Edward Johns Grinling	267		
Labour	Mrs Elizabeth Frances Bullimore	226		
Turnout		493		

=== Grantham no. 8 ===
Grantham no. 8
Party	Candidate	Votes	%	±%
Independent	Mrs Dorothy Shipman	189		
Independent	Mrs Veronica Mary Platt Webster	174		
Labour	Reginald Edgar Burnett	91		
Turnout		454		

=== Grantham no. 9 ===
Grantham no. 9
Party	Candidate	Votes	%	±%
Labour	Reginald Charles Moore	389		
Independent	Edward Roberts	339		
Turnout		728		

=== Grantham no. 10 ===
Grantham no. 10
Party	Candidate	Votes	%	±%
Independent	Mrs Louise Marion Ward	243		
Labour	George William Bowen	156		
Turnout		399		

=== Heckington ===
Heckington
Party	Candidate	Votes	%	±%
	G. H. Goose	298	39.7%	
	F. W. Watson	264	35.2%	
Labour	J. H. Brighton	188	25.1%	
Turnout		750		

=== Helpringham ===
Helpringham
Party	Candidate	Votes	%	±%
	W. G. Cragg	NA	NA	

=== Kyme ===
Kyme
Party	Candidate	Votes	%	±%
	C. J. Willows	NA	NA	

=== Leadenham ===
Leadenham
Party	Candidate	Votes	%	±%
	Henry W. N. Fane	NA	NA	

=== Market Deeping ===
Market Deeping
Party	Candidate	Votes	%	±%
	Francis R. Wade	NA	NA	

=== Martin ===
Martin
Party	Candidate	Votes	%	±%
	John F. Vickers	NA	NA	

=== Metheringham ===
Metheringham
Party	Candidate	Votes	%	±%
	F. C. Townsend	317		
	R. A. Fincham	281		
Turnout		598		

=== Morton ===
Morton
Party	Candidate	Votes	%	±%
	Rev. C. Letts	271		
	R. Pacey	207		
	H. B. Atkinson	193		
Turnout		750		

=== Navenby ===
Navenby
Party	Candidate	Votes	%	±%
	Charles B. Aram	NA	NA	

=== North Hykeham ===
North Hykeham
Party	Candidate	Votes	%	±%
	George W. Hutson	NA	NA	

=== Osbournby ===
Osbournby
Party	Candidate	Votes	%	±%
	Rev. David Jones	NA	NA	

=== Ponton ===
Ponton
Party	Candidate	Votes	%	±%
	Sir H. J. E. S. Cholmeley Bt	NA	NA	

=== Rippingale ===
Rippingale
Party	Candidate	Votes	%	±%
	A. W. Sharman	NA	NA	

=== Ropsley ===
Ropsley
Party	Candidate	Votes	%	±%
	Joseph F. Dodds	NA	NA	

=== Ruskington ===
Ruskington
Party	Candidate	Votes	%	±%
	B. E. Brighton	NA	NA	

=== Scopwick ===
Scopwick
Party	Candidate	Votes	%	±%
	Kenneth C. Irving	NA	NA	

=== Skellingthorpe ===
Skellingthorpe
Party	Candidate	Votes	%	±%
	R. C. Turner	NA	NA	

=== Sleaford no. 1 ===
Sleaford no. 1
Party	Candidate	Votes	%	±%
	E. W. Elmore	443		
	S. S. Williams	255		
Turnout		698		

=== Sleaford no. 2 ===
Sleaford no. 2
Party	Candidate	Votes	%	±%
	H. H. Brown	NA	NA	

=== Sleaford no. 3 ===
Sleaford no. 3
Party	Candidate	Votes	%	±%
	W. Middleton	225		
	Mrs C. D. Jessop	224		
Turnout		449		

=== Stamford no. 1 ===
Stamford no. 1
Party	Candidate	Votes	%	±%
Independent	Ernest Ireson	336		
Labour	Harold Knowles	189		
Turnout		525		

=== Stamford no. 2 ===
Stamford no. 2
Party	Candidate	Votes	%	±%
Independent	C. Prestwood	285		
Labour	W. A. J. Downes	145		
Turnout		525		

=== Stamford no. 3 ===
Stamford no. 3
Party	Candidate	Votes	%	±%
Independent	James S. Prior	344		
Labour	J. W. L. Whincup	237		
Turnout		499		

=== Stamford no. 4 ===
Stamford no. 4
Party	Candidate	Votes	%	±%
Independent	P. K. Banks	325		
Labour	L. March	276		
Turnout		525		

=== Stamford no. 5 ===
Stamford no. 5
Party	Candidate	Votes	%	±%
Labour	A. E. Millett	532		
Independent	H. Skells	304		
Turnout		836		

=== Swinderby ===
Swinderby
Party	Candidate	Votes	%	±%
	P. W. Spray	312		
	R. Hewison	116		
Turnout		428		

=== Thurlby ===
Thurlby
Party	Candidate	Votes	%	±%
	T. G. Holmes	NA	NA	

=== Uffington ===
Uffington
Party	Candidate	Votes	%	±%
	Roland Luker	NA	NA	

=== Washingborough ===
Washingborough
Party	Candidate	Votes	%	±%
	G. H. Applewhite	NA	NA	

=== Welby ===
Welby
Party	Candidate	Votes	%	±%
	Brigadier-General R. L. Adlercron	NA	NA	

=== Wilsford ===
Wilsford
Party	Candidate	Votes	%	±%
	Lieutenant-Commander J. Cracroft-Amcotts	NA	NA	

=== Woolsthorpe ===
Woolsthorpe
Party	Candidate	Votes	%	±%
	Major H. R. E. Welby	216		
	F. King	75		
Turnout		291		
