= Weston Cracroft-Amcotts =

English land-owner, soldier and local politician

Lieutenant-Colonel Sir Weston Cracroft-Amcotts, MC, DL, JP (7 November 1888 – 17 September 1975) was an English land-owner, soldier and local politician, who served as Chairman of Lindsey County Council and High Sheriff of Lincolnshire.

== Early life and family ==
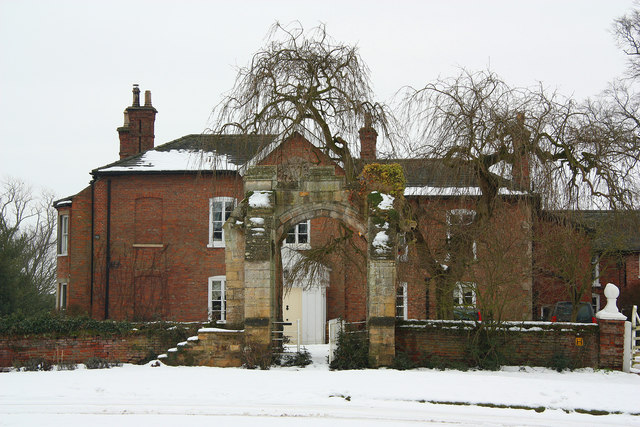
Kettlethorpe

Weston Cracroft-Amcotts was born in Lincolnshire on 7 November 1888, the eldest of two sons of Major Frederick Augustus Cracroft-Amcotts, JP (1853–1897), of Kettlethorpe Hall in Lincolnshire, and his wife, Emily Grace (died 1936), JP, youngest daughter of Anthony Willson, of South Rauceby Hall, Lincolnshire; his younger brother was Lieutenant-Commander John Cracroft-Amcotts, and their father was the son of Weston Cracroft Amcotts, a Member of Parliament for Mid-Lincolnshire.

Cracroft-Amcotts married, on 23 June 1927, Rhona, only daughter of Edward Clifton Clifton-Brown, of Burnham Grove in Buckinghamshire; they had four daughters: Rosemary Grace (born 1928; married Lieutenant-Commander Gervis Hugh Frere Frere-Cook); Marian Cicely (born 1931; married Thomas Charles Weguelin Micklem); Bridget Katherine, CVO (1933–2008; married Robert Peel Charles Eley), Lord Lieutenant of Lincolnshire (1995–2008); and Penelope Sylvia (born 1938).

== Career ==
After schooling at Eton College and training at the Royal Military Academy in Woolwich, Cracroft-Amcotts was commissioned as a Second Lieutenant in the Corps of Royal Engineers in the British Army on 29 July 1908. He was promoted to Lieutenant on 18 August 1910 and served in Europe during World War I, when he was mentioned in dispatches twice and received the Military Cross, before retiring in 1920 with the rank of Major. Having reached the age limit of liability for recall, he was removed from the reserve of officers in December 1938, but was commissioned as a Major in the 46th Battalion of the Lincolnshire Regiment of the Territorial Army on New Years Day 1939. He retired again with the rank of Lieutenant-Colonel in 1942; however, he was then appointed to that rank in the Home Guard, serving till the last year of World War II.

Cracroft-Amcotts lived at Hackthorn Hall and Kettlethorpe Hall in Lincolnshire, the latter of which he sold in 1961. He was appointed a Justice of the Peace for Lindsey in 1924 and a Deputy Lieutenant for Lincolnshire in 1936, before serving as the county's High Sheriff in 1954. He was Chairman of Lindsey County Council between 1951 and 1964.

He died on 17 September 1975.
