= William Henry Clark =

British diplomat (1876–1952)

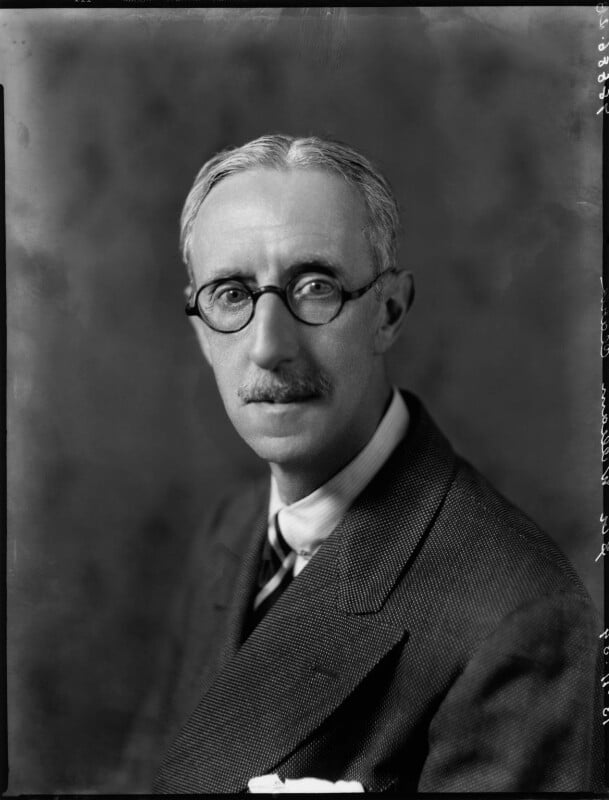
Clark in 1934

Sir William Henry Clark GCMG KCSI (4 January 1876 – 22 November 1952) was a British civil servant and diplomat. He was the first British High Commissioner to Canada 1928–1934.

== Early life ==
Clark was educated at Eton College and Trinity College, Cambridge. His father was John Willis Clark.

== Diplomatic career ==
Clark began his career as a clerk at the Board of Trade in 1899. He was Secretary to the Special Mission to Shanghai to negotiate a Commercial Treaty with China in 1901, went on to become acting 2nd secretary in Diplomatic Service in February 1902, and was secretary to Royal Commission on Supply of Food, etc., in Time of War, 1903-1905. He was private secretary at Board of Trade to David Lloyd George, 1906; to Winston Churchill, 1908; and again to Lloyd George as Chancellor of Exchequer, 1908–1910. Clark was also the Member for Commerce and Industry of the Council of the Viceroy of India, 1910–1916; Comptroller-General, Commercial Intelligence Department of Board of Trade, 1916–1917; Comptroller-General of Department of Overseas Trade, 1917–1928.

Clark was the first High Commissioner of HM Government to Canada from 1928 until 1934, during which time he acquired and lived in Earnscliffe manor, the former home of the first Prime Minister of Canada, John A. Macdonald. From 1934 to 1939 he was British High Commissioner for Basutoland, Bechuanaland Protectorate, Swaziland, and the Union of South Africa. He retired in 1940.

He is buried in the Parish of the Ascension Burial Ground in Cambridge, with his wife Lady Clark, née Anne Monsell (22 February 1880 – 11 November 1946), former wife of W. Bennett Pike.

== See also ==
- List of high commissioners of the United Kingdom to Canada
- List of high commissioners of the United Kingdom to South Africa

Diplomatic posts
| Preceded by Herbert Stanley | British High Commissioner to South Africa; 1935–1939 | Succeeded by Edward Harding |
