= Frank Jenkinson =

English farmer, politician and magistrate (1882 – 1965)

Francis Joseph Jenkinson, OBE, JP (16 December 1882 – 12 January 1965), frequently referred to in print as F. J. Jenkinson, and in person as Frank Jenkinson, was an English farmer, local politician and magistrate, who served as Chairman of Kesteven County Council and Chairman of the West Kesteven Rural District Council.

== Early life and family ==
Born in Barrowby Vale on 16 December 1882, Jenkinson was the second of two sons of George Augustus Jenkinson (died 1929) and his wife Mary Elizabeth (1845–1936), a native of Saltfleetby near Louth. The elder Jenkinson's family had lived in Barrowby for generations; he was educated at Sedgebrook Grammar School and farmed at Barrowby until he was 60 (initially with his father), before moving to the larger Highfield Farm at Great Gonerby in about 1905. A staunch churchgoer, he represented Great Gonerby on Kesteven County Council for nine years, sat on the Parish Council and chaired the Gonerby Conservative Association. His elder son was George Augustus Jenkinson, of Old Somerby, who also served on Kesteven County Council.

On 21 April 1920, Francis Jenkinson married his cousin, Mary Pleasance Cummings (died 1952), a daughter of Rev. T. S. Cracknell, vicar of Sutton St James. She was a widow: her first husband, Dr W. G. Cummings, of Ealing, had died in 1917 while fighting in France in the Royal Army Medical Corps. Her only child, Elizabeth Pleasance "Betty" Cummings, was born of the first marriage. In 1938 she married Dr Herbert Beaton Giles (died 1953), son of Rev. Charles Giles, of Aberdeen. By 1952, she had married again, to John Norton, a Grantham solicitor. On 21 June 1954, Jenkinson married for a second time, to Mary Wilson, who had lived in East Yorkshire before residing at Great Gonerby for a year prior to the marriage.

== Career ==
=== Rural District Council ===
Jenkinson joined the National Farmers Union in 1910. He was elected a member of the Grantham Rural District Council (later West Kesteven Rural District Council) in 1913, representing the Gonerby division. He became the district council's vice-chairman in 1925 and its chairman in 1928, and served continually for 35 years until 1963, continuing after the rural district merged with the Claypole RDC in 1931. Over the course of his career, he served on every committee in the council and chaired each of them. At the end of 1964 the Council presented him with a silver casket and inscribed scroll to commemorate his 50 years' service as a councillor, which was thought to be a national record.

=== County Council ===
Jenkinson was elected to Kesteven County Council in 1919 and became an alderman in 1922. In 1940, the council's vice-chairman, Alderman J. H. Bowman, died. In November, Councillor Rev. Cecil St John Wright proposed Jenkinson to succeed him, which was seconded by Alderman W. King-Fane. Councillors M. T. Chambers and J. S. Reeve also proposed Lieutenant-Colonel F. D. Trollope-Bellew, but the council voted 31 to 23 for Jenkinson. During the proposals, Reeve quoted Sir Charles Welby as saying that Jenkinson's work in West Kesteven had shown him to be "a splendid chairman with a most statesmanlike and wide point of view". After the death of Sir Robert Pattinson, Jenkinson was unanimously elected chairman of the Council in February 1955; presided over by Mrs G. H. Schwind, that meeting marked the first time that a woman had taken the chair in the council's history. Jenkinson served in the post until 1962, when deafness prompted him to resign.

=== Other posts and later life ===
Jenkinson served as chairman of the Grantham branch of the National Farmer's Union between 1919 and 1929. On his retirement, E. C. Newton, his successor, presented an illustrated address and the branch members presented two chairs to him in gratitude of his service. He subsequently chaired the Lincolnshire county branch of the NFU, and in 1937 was presented with a gold watch and silver salver in recognition of his eight years of service in that position. He took an active interest in the NFU's labour committees, and was on the Lindsey and Kesteven Wages Committee at the time of his death. For many years, Jenkinson also represented the NFU on the Agricultural Wages Board and was a life member of both the Lincolnshire Branch and the Executive Committee.

A magistrate from 1923, Jenkinson was chair of the Spitalgate magistrates from 1944 until he retired at the compulsory age. He served on numerous other local bodies, including the governing bodies of several schools, and was twice chair of the South Lincolnshire branch of the Rural District Councils' Association, and chair of the income tax commissioners.

Having been appointed an Officer of the Order of the British Empire (OBE) for his public services in 1958, Jenkinson died at his home at Great Gonerby on 12 January 1965, aged 82. A funeral service took place on the 15 January at Barrowby parish church and he was buried at St Sebastian's Church in Great Gonerby on 21 January 1965. The NFU issued a statement saying that he was an "able negotiator" who "devoted the better part of his life serving his fellow man, particularly in the agricultural sector". The Grantham Journal called his "one of the most outstanding careers in local government that Kesteven has ever seen", considering his service to have been "unparalleled".

== Likeness ==
- Black and white photograph, reproduced in "Death, Aged 82, of Ald. F. J. Jenkinson", The Grantham Journal, 15 January 1965, p. 1.

Political offices
Preceded by J. H. Bowman	Vice-Chairman of Kesteven County Council; 1940 – 1955	Succeeded by John Cracroft-Amcotts
Preceded by Sir Robert Pattinson	Chairman of Kesteven County Council; 1955 – 1962	Succeeded by H. W. N. Fane
