= Adlercron =

Adlercron is a surname. Notable people with the surname include:

- John Adlercron (died 1766), British Army officer and Commander-in-Chief, India
- Rodolph Ladeveze Adlercron (1873–1966), British Army officer and politician
