= Sir Robert Pattinson Academy =

Location
- Moor Lane; North Hykeham, Lincolnshire, LN6 9AF; England; 53°11′12″N 0°35′29″W

Information
- Type: Academy
- Motto: Sapientia et doctrina Wisdom and Learning
- Established: 1953
- Founder: Kesteven County Council
- Department for Education URN: 137135 Tables
- Ofsted: Reports
- Chair: Rev Canon Alan Robson
- Head teacher: Dale Hardy
- Gender: Coeducational
- Age: 11 to 18
- Enrolment: 1,450
- Houses: Windsor, Stuart, Tudor, York and Lancaster
- Colour: Blue/Red
- Former name: Robert Pattinson School
- Website: http://www.srpa.co.uk

Sir Robert Pattinson Academy (formerly Robert Pattinson School) is a secondary school on the northeast side of Moor Lane in North Hykeham, Lincolnshire, England. Also known as RP, Lincoln City used the field as temporary training grounds. The Academy has approximately 1,450 students and is a Language College specialist school.

== History ==
In 1939 it was expected to cost £25,660. On Wednesday 19 November 1952, at a meeting of Kesteven education committee in Grantham, it was decided to call the new North Hykeham Secondary School, with the former chairman's name; he had been on the education committee for fifty years. The chairman of the education committee was John Cracroft-Amcotts. It was hoped to open the school in April 1953.

=== Bilateral school ===
The school was opened in 1953 as the Robert Pattinson School. Sir Robert Pattinson was the Chairman of Kesteven County Council for 20 years, and for 50 years a County Councillor. He was Liberal MP for Grantham from 1922–23. He was knighted in 1934, the year he became leader of Kesteven County Council.

It opened in September 1953, with ten classrooms, built by William Wright & Sons of Lincoln. It was 21 acres, including 15 acres of playing fields. The flooring was by Granwood Flooring of Riddings in Derbyshire.It was planned to house 1,100 children.

After his re-election in 1954 as chairman of the council, Sir Robert Pattinson described the new school in North Hykeham as 'an extravagant waste of money'. Sir Robert also thought that secondary education was wasted on half the boys, who would be better out working with mechanical tasks, and that secondary school was only best for people who would 'advance in the world'. He later died on 2 December 1954 at Fosse House on Church Lane, his home.

It was officially opened on Saturday 26 June 1954 by James Chuter Ede, along with Sir Robert Pattinson, and the architect R E M Coombes. The school was blessed by the Bishop of Grimsby. The North Hykeham Evening Institute taught at the school from 1954.

Construction work costing £160,154 began in April 1956, built by F R Eccleshare Ltd, for the second stage. In early December 1959 it was decided to end the bilateral system. The new North Kesteven grammar school would take grammar school children from North Hykeham and Branston.

The school was a 'bilateral' school (part grammar/part secondary modern) until January 1961 when the grammar school students transferred to the newly opened North Kesteven Grammar School.

=== Secondary modern school ===
An open-air pool opened in September 1962. In 1965 it was the first British school to have a video recorder. There were 1000 children by 1968.

=== Comprehensive ===
It became a comprehensive when parts of northern Kesteven became comprehensive in September 1970. This was four years before Lincoln went comprehensive – Lincoln was a separate county borough until April 1974.

Cafeteria meals began on 4 February 1980, for the 1165 children. In November 1984, geography teacher Howard Eve was suspended for swearing; he had been deputy head of Geography since 1972. In March 1985 there was an attempted arson attack, thwarted by an alert policeman.

In 1991, local Conservative councillor, Zena Scoley, questioned the standard of education that comprehensive schools could offer. She said that comprehensive schools in Lincoln were providing 'mediocre education', and that the new CTC school was needed, to provide a better standard. Labour councillors were also trying to derail the new CTC school.

In 1993, £500,000 of construction began on new science labs, which was opened in May 1994, and was officially opened in October 1994.

It became a grant-maintained school self-governing in 1992, transferring to Foundation status in 1999. On 1 August 2011 the school became an Academy and changed its name to Sir Robert Pattinson Academy.

=== Timeline ===
- 1992 – became a self-governing school with grant-maintained status
- 1994 – new science block opened by Sir Henry Nevile, Lord Lieutenant of Lincolnshire
- 2000 – become a Beacon School
- 2001 – appointed as a specialist school for languages
- 2002 – language site opened by Anne, Princess Royal on 18 April
- 2003 – achievement award for examination performance. Listed as an effective school by Ofsted
- 2004 – John Alexander Music Suite opened, after a donation of £125,000
- 2005 – new technology suite opened by Stewart Pattinson, grandson of Sir Robert Pattinson. Recognised as a high-performing specialist school by the Department for Education and Skills
- 2006 – appointed as a Languages and Science College
- 2011 – granted academy status. Name change to Sir Robert Pattinson Academy
- 2016 – new drama studio opened
- 2018 – new library and refurbished classrooms opened
- 2018 – new head teacher appointed

== Army Cadet Force and Air Training Corps ==
The Band Det (F) detachment of the Army Cadet Force is sited on the school. It was formed by the Nottingham-based East Midlands Reserve Forces. The cadet building was built in October 2010, and is used by the Regimental Band of the Lincolnshire Army Cadet Force.1237 Squadron (North Hykeham) ATC are also based there and the two cadet forces work together to ensure a positive image of young people in the community.

== Academic performance ==
In the 1990s the school received GCSE results 3% higher than the Lincolnshire average. The school receives average GCSE results in Lincolnshire and England. At A level, the North Hykeham Joint Sixth Form is slightly over the English average.

== Headteachers ==
- 1953, Mr John William Noon Winwood, of Branston, Lincolnshire, he moved from Withernsea High School, a bilateral school. In April 1960, he was appointed the head of North Kesteven Grammar School, from September 1960. He attended Ilkeston County School, in the late 1920s, originating from Beauvale in Nottinghamshire, and married at Eastwood Congregational Church, when a teacher at the Herbert Strutt School in Belper, in August 1938
- January 1961, Mr Ivan B Reynolds, former head of Branston County Secondary Modern School He left, aged 57, in December 1980; he had taught in Lincolnshire from 1947.
- January 1981, Bryn Williams, a former English teacher. He left in December 1995, followed by the deputy head

== Notable former pupils ==
- Lindsay Coulson – actress, known for her portrayal of Carol Jackson in EastEnders
- Nigel Huddleston – Conservative Party Member of Parliament (MP) for the Mid Worcestershire
- Paul Mayo – footballer
- Sophie Wells - para-equestrian gold medalist
