= Emmeline Taylor =

Emmeline Taylor, JP (née Pattinson; died 20 November 1937) was an English local politician who served as the first female county councillor for Kesteven and that council's first female alderman; she was also one of the first women to be appointed a magistrate on the Sleaford Bench.

== Early life and family ==
Emmeline Pattinson was the second daughter of William Pattinson, a railway contractor from the Lincolnshire village of Ruskington, near Sleaford. Her father, who died in 1906, ran the building company Messrs. Pattinson and Son alongside serving as chairman of Ruskington Urban District Council. Her siblings included Sir Robert Pattinson (d. 1954), who served as chairman of Kesteven County Council between 1934 and 1954, and briefly as the Liberal Member of Parliament (MP) for Grantham; Samuel Pattinson (d. 1942), briefly Liberal MP for Horncastle and also a long-serving member of Kesteven County Council; John Pattinson (d. 1939), also a Kesteven County Councillor and a justice of the peace; and Annie Lucy, the wife of the Liberal MP and newspaper publisher Sir Richard Winfrey. Emmeline would later serve alongside her brothers Robert, Samuel and John on the Kesteven County Council. Emmeline was married to the artist, S. F. H. Taylor, and took his surname.

== Career ==
As a young woman, Taylor worked at the family business. She entered public service as a Poor Law Guardian for the Sleaford Board, sitting for 20 years, and then became a Governor of the Sleaford and Kesteven High School, before joining the Ruskinghton Urban District Council. In 1920, she was one of the first four women elevated to the Sleaford Bench as a magistrate and throughout her work in that capacity, she was particularly active in juvenile cases. In 1926, she was elected a councillor for Kesteven County Council and was elevated to the aldermanic bench in 1932; she was the first woman to occupy those roles and, at the time of her death, remained the only female alderman in the council's history. While on the council, she was a member of the Joint Board for the Mentally Defective and took a special interest in Harmston Hall Mental Hospital. She was also a member of the Council's Education Committee. In party politics, she was a Liberal, like her siblings, and was President of the Women's Liberal Association of Sleaford.

Taylor lived at Flaxwell, a house on London Road, Sleaford, and died on 20 November 1937, aged 73, in a nursing home in the town after a long illness. The Lincolnshire Echo called her "one of the best known public figures in Sleaford".
