= Henry Chaplin, 1st Viscount Chaplin =

British politician (1840–1923)

The Right Honourable The Viscount Chaplin PC
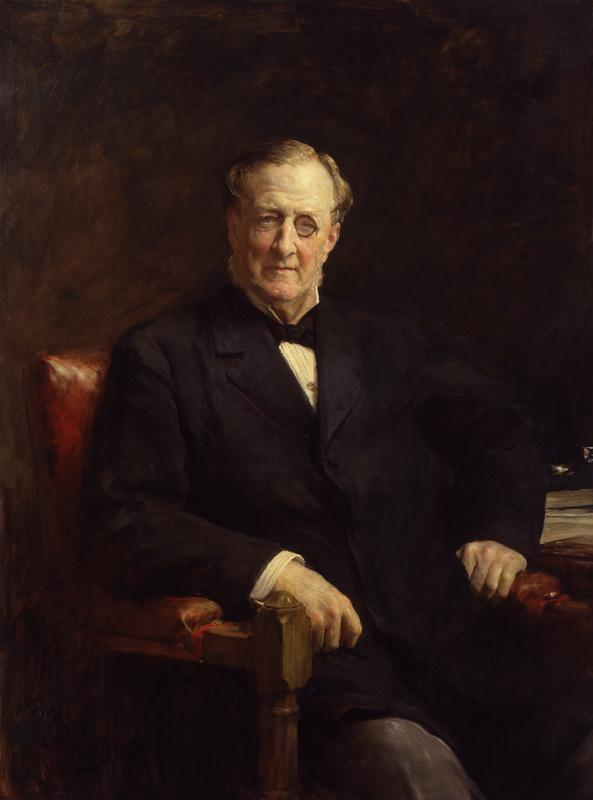
- Henry Chaplin, 1908 portrait by Arthur Stockdale Cope

Chancellor of the Duchy of Lancaster
- In office 24 June 1885 – 28 January 1886
- Monarch: Victoria
- Prime Minister: The Marquess of Salisbury
- Preceded by: George Trevelyan
- Succeeded by: Edward Heneage

President of the Board of Agriculture
- In office 9 September 1889 – 11 August 1892
- Monarch: Victoria
- Prime Minister: The Marquess of Salisbury
- Preceded by: New office
- Succeeded by: Herbert Gardner

President of the Local Government Board
- In office 29 June 1895 – 12 November 1900
- Monarch: Victoria
- Prime Minister: The Marquess of Salisbury
- Preceded by: George Shaw-Lefevre
- Succeeded by: Walter Long

Personal details
- Born: 22 December 1840 Ryhall, Rutland, England
- Died: 29 May 1923 (aged 82) Londonderry House, London, England
- Party: Conservative
- Spouse: Lady Florence Sutherland-Leveson-Gower (d. 1881)
- Education: Christ Church, Oxford

Henry Chaplin, 1st Viscount Chaplin PC (22 December 1840 – 29 May 1923) was a British landowner, racehorse owner and Conservative Party politician who sat in the House of Commons from 1868 until 1916 when he was raised to the peerage.

== Background and education ==
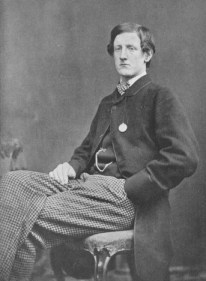
Henry Chaplin, portrait aged 18

The member of an old Lincolnshire family, Chaplin was born at Ryhall, Rutland, the second son of the Reverend Henry Chaplin, of Blankney, Lincolnshire, and his wife Carolina Horatia Ellice, daughter of William Ellice. His younger brother, Edward Chaplin, was also a politician. Chaplin was educated at Harrow and Christ Church, Oxford, where he was a friend of the Prince of Wales. At the age of 21, he inherited substantial estates in Lincolnshire (including the family seat of Blankney Hall), Nottinghamshire and Yorkshire. He was a Justice of the Peace and a Deputy Lieutenant of Lincolnshire, and a leading member of the Turf.

== Engagement to Lady Florence Paget ==
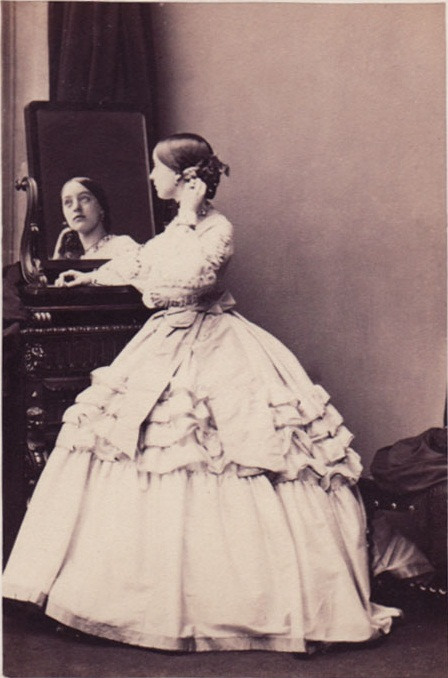
Lady Florence Paget by Camille Silvy

In 1864, Chaplin fell in love with and became engaged to Lady Florence, daughter of Henry Paget, 2nd Marquess of Anglesey and a celebrated beauty. The wedding was to be the society event of the year with the Prince of Wales one of many to offer his congratulations. However, during their engagement Florence had secretly fallen in love with his best friend, Henry Rawdon-Hastings, 4th Marquess of Hastings. Just before her wedding, she had Chaplin take her to Marshall & Snelgrove's on Oxford Street to add to her wedding outfit. While Chaplin waited in the carriage outside, Florence walked straight through the shop and out to the other side, where Hastings waited for her in a carriage. Hastings and Florence were married on the same day. After the wedding, a reception was held in St James' Place before the newly married couple set off for their honeymoon at Donington Hall, Leicestershire while the scandal died down. Florence Paget informed Chaplin by letter the next day.

In the 1867 Derby, Chaplin renewed his rivalry with Lord Hastings. Hastings wagered thousands of pounds against Chaplin's horse, Hermit. Ten days before the race Hermit was injured and Chaplin was advised not to enter him. However, the injury was not as serious as first thought, and though not fully fit, Hermit entered the race and won it. Lord Hastings lost heavily and fell into severe debts. Adding to a drinking problem, Chaplin's great rival died in poverty the following year, aged 26.

== Political career ==
Chaplin first entered parliament at the 1868 general election as Member of Parliament (MP) for Mid-Lincolnshire. He represented this constituency until it was replaced under the Redistribution of Seats Act 1885. In the 1885 general election he was returned to parliament for the new Sleaford division which he held until his defeat at the 1906 general election.

He was a devoted follower and admirer of Benjamin Disraeli, and they struck up a close friendship. Despite their political differences, Chaplin also retained the friendship and respect of the Liberal prime minister, William Ewart Gladstone, until the end of his life. On 29 April 1869 Chaplin delivered his maiden speech on the Irish Church Bill, which disestablished the Church of Ireland.

During the summer of 1875, Chaplin remained in London rather than attend Brighton races, in order to assist Disraeli in supporting the Merchant Shipping Bill against the opposition of Samuel Plimsoll. Disraeli wrote to Lady Bradford on 30 July: "He has never left my side, and his aid has been invaluable. He is a natural orator and a debater too. He is the best speaker in the House of Commons or will be. Mark my words". Chaplin also supported Disraeli's government against Liberal opposition during the debates on the Royal Titles Bill, which conferred on Queen Victoria the title "Empress of India".

Chaplin was a lifelong advocate of protectionism, being in this respect the most prominent inheritor of the views of Lord George Bentinck; his daughter Edith said he was "born a Protectionist, and to the end he remained convinced that Tariff Reform was the only measure which could restore a satisfactory means of livelihood to the English farmer". He was a member of the Royal Commission on the Depressed Condition of the Agricultural Interests (1879–1882) and opposed the Radicals' campaign to replace landlords with peasant proprietorship. The Royal Commission's final report blamed the agricultural depression on excessive foreign competition and the adoption of the gold standard, which had contributed to the decline in prices. Chaplin thereafter became an advocate of bimetallism.

Chaplin was sworn of the Privy Council in 1885 and filled the office of Chancellor of the Duchy of Lancaster in Lord Salisbury's short ministry of 1885 to 1886. He opposed Gladstone's Irish Home Rule Bill of 1886, and when the Conservatives returned to power that year he turned down Salisbury's offer of the Department of Agriculture, which did not then have a seat in the Cabinet.

He became the first President of the Board of Agriculture in 1889, with a seat in the Cabinet, and retained this post until 1892. In the Conservative Cabinet of 1895 to 1900 he was President of the Local Government Board, and was responsible for the Agricultural Rates Act 1896. However, he was not included in the ministry after its reconstruction in 1900. Salisbury offered him a peerage, which he declined. Chaplin was considered an authority on agricultural matters and he served on the Royal Commission on the Supply of Food and Raw Materials in Time of War (1903–1905), the Royal Commission on Housing and the Royal Commission on Horse Breeding. He was also president of the Old Age Pensions Committee.

When in 1903 the Tariff Reform movement began under Joseph Chamberlain's leadership, he gave it his enthusiastic support, becoming a member of the Tariff Commission and one of the most strenuous advocates in the country of tariffs in opposition to free trade. His daughter Edith said that Chamberlain's adoption of Tariff Reform must have seemed to Chaplin that "the hour he had waited for all his life had come at last"; Chaplin had been raised in a wheat-growing county that had been hard-hit by the agricultural depression and he had for years past advocated protectionism as a solution. He had supported the protectionist "Fair Trade" campaign in the 1880s and gained the nickname the "Veteran Protectionist". Chaplin earned Chamberlain's gratitude for his hard work in the Tariff Reform campaign.

After losing his seat at Sleaford in the Liberal landslide of 1906, Chaplin was returned to the House of Commons at a by-election in May 1907 as member for Wimbledon. His opponent was the Independent Liberal candidate, Bertrand Russell, who stood on a platform of women's suffrage. Chaplin was opposed to this, saying "he might be very old-fashioned, but he drew the line at that". His own campaign focused on Tariff Reform and Imperial Preference, imperial union and opposition to Irish Home Rule. In his election address for the January 1910 general election, Chaplin supported the proposals of Lord Roberts and Lord Charles Beresford on national defence, and reiterated his support for Tariff Reform.

In 1912 he was dismayed when Bonar Law, the Conservative leader, dropped tariffs on food as official Conservative policy in order to focus on fighting the Liberal government's Irish Home Rule Bill. Chaplin was an ardent supporter of the Ulster Unionists in their opposition to the Bill during the 1914 crisis, believing that Home Rule would be the first step towards imperial disintegration. Upon the outbreak of the First World War in August 1914, Chaplin supported the stance took by H. H. Asquith and congratulated Margot Asquith on her husband's speech that announced Britain's entry into the conflict.

When the Conservatives entered into a coalition with the Liberal government in 1915, Chaplin became the leader of an Opposition in the House of Commons that offered friendly criticism. He held his seat in the Commons until 1916, when he was raised to the peerage as Viscount Chaplin, of Saint Oswald's, Blankney, in the County of Lincoln. He believed that the emergency wartime measures taken by the government to ensure the supply of food had vindicated his protectionist beliefs, writing in April 1917 of "the vital need to go back to the old system and grow most of our food here in the future".

During the political crisis of autumn 1922, Chaplin, along with other "Die Hards", was opposed to the Conservatives remaining in the coalition government headed by David Lloyd George. On 19 October, he tried to attend the Carlton Club meeting of Conservative MPs that decided to end the coalition but he was refused admittance because he was a peer. Five days later he wrote to a leading supporter of the coalition, Austen Chamberlain: "What did you was the Coalition!! From many letters I received I was almost sure it would be fatal. Far and away the greatest man in my time was Disraeli and he stated..."England loves not Coalitions"."

Chaplin's personality enabled him to make friends across the political spectrum, and after his death the Labour MP George Lansbury wrote in the Daily Herald: "Our best friends were the late Henry Chaplin, Lord Long and Gerald Balfour; they all, at least, tried to understand us". His Conservative colleague Walter Long said Chaplin was "a fine speaker of the old-fashioned school, and delivered many great "orations" from his place in Parliament, and was one of the most deservedly popular men that ever lived". Chaplin's friend Lord Willoughby de Broke said he possessed a geniality and kindliness that contributed to his popularity:

The English public in fact have always recognised in him a manifestation of an ideal they have been seeking, a fine symbol of their own race, a sportsman and a "Sahib," and a political leader among the governing classes who owned the land... He was one of the last, almost the last, of the fox-hunting country gentlemen who also wielded political influence... [N]o one was half such a country gentleman as Henry Chaplin looked... He possessed a strongly marked individuality, easily recognisable, familiar to the public. Every one knew him by sight.

Willoughby de Broke recalled an occasion before the First World War when he helped Chaplin judge Lord Lonsdale's young foxhounds; after luncheon, Chaplin rose to reply to the toast of "The Judges", when all the puppy-walkers got up and sang "For He's a Jolly Good Fellow":

[They] cheered him and cheered him again and again before he was allowed to speak. There he was. He was "The Squire." He was their own Harry Chaplin, who loved the soil and the horses and the bullocks and the hounds and the hunting. He was part of them, and they were part of him; they knew how he loved agriculture, and how he hated "Dicky Cobden" and all his works, and they just took him to their hearts.

In her biography of Chaplin, his daughter Edith said he was "of no outstanding brilliance, he owed his power to his fixed sincerity of purpose", and concluded:

[H]e was a representative—almost the last representative—of that type of landed gentry whose political and social influence had meant so much to Victorian England. He belonged essentially to that old school of country gentlemen to whom a long line of squires had bequeathed a tradition of responsibility to their country no less than to their acres. ... He was a representative of an elder England, which changes in little things but continues unchanged in the greater matters of policy and conduct—the essential England of good sense, generosity, humour, and faithful service.

== Agriculture ==
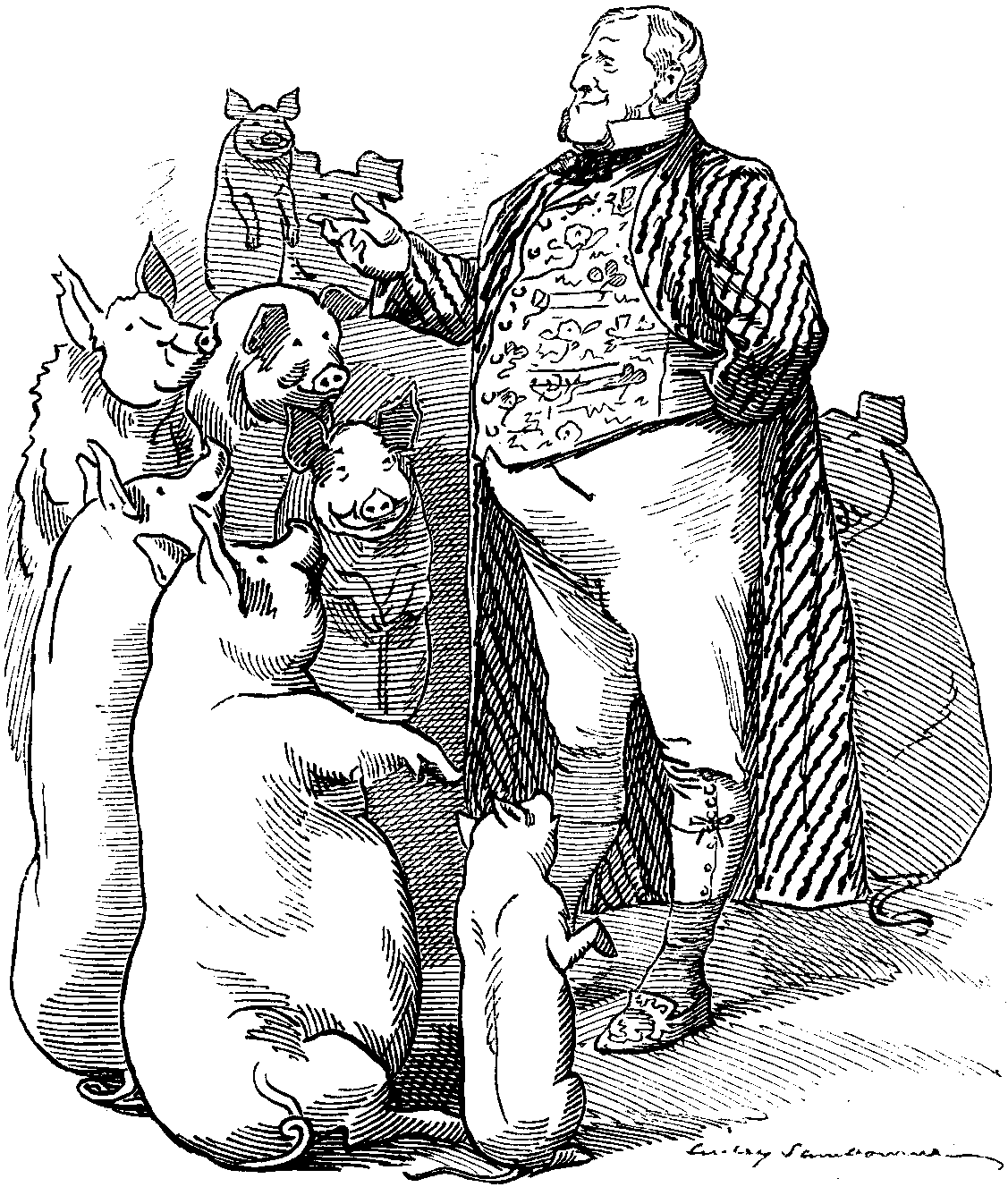
Henry Chaplin in a Punch cartoon accompanying a satirical article on his receiving a deputation on the subject of the swine fever.

Known as the "Squire of Blankney", Chaplin took an active interest in agricultural questions, as a popular and typical representative of the English "country gentleman" class. However, mounting debts forced him to sell the family seat of Blankney Hall to Lord Londesborough in 1887.

== Family ==
In 1876, Chaplin married Lady Florence, daughter of George Sutherland-Leveson-Gower, 3rd Duke of Sutherland, who had survived the Wigan rail crash of 1873. They had one son, Eric, and two daughters, Edith and Florence. Lady Florence died in childbirth in 1881, giving birth to her youngest daughter, Florence. Lord Chaplin remained a widower until his death in May 1923, aged 82. He was succeeded in the viscountcy by his son, Eric.

Chaplin and Lady Florence's eldest daughter, the Hon. Edith, married Charles Vane-Tempest-Stewart, 7th Marquess of Londonderry, and became a well-known society hostess. In 1926 she wrote a 400-page memoir of him.

== Arms ==
Coat of arms of Henry Chaplin, 1st Viscount Chaplin

Crest
A griffin's head erased Or gorged with a mural coronet Vert.
Escutcheon
Ermine on a chief indented Vert three griffins' heads erased Or.
Supporters
Dexter upon a garb fesswise Proper banded Gules a hawk wings endorsed and inverted Argent beaked membered and the inside of the wings Or suspended from the neck by a riband Sable an escutcheon of the arms of Sutherland (i.e. Gules three mullets Or within a bordure of the last charged with a double tressure flory counterflory of the field). Sinister a chestnut-coloured racehorse in a white headstall banded rose colour pendant therefrom a blue lead all Proper.
Motto
In Coela Quies

Parliament of the United Kingdom
| New constituency | Member of Parliament for Mid Lincolnshire; 1868–1885; With: Weston Cracroft Amcotts 1868–1874; Hon. Edward Stanhope 1874–1885 | Constituency abolished |
| New constituency | Member of Parliament for Sleaford; 1885–1906 | Succeeded by Arnold Lupton |
| Preceded by Charles Eric Hambro | Member of Parliament for Wimbledon; 1907–1916 | Succeeded by Sir Stuart Coats, Bt |
Political offices
| Preceded by George Trevelyan | Chancellor of the Duchy of Lancaster; 1885–1886 | Succeeded by Edward Heneage |
| New office | President of the Board of Agriculture; 1889–1892 | Succeeded by Herbert Gardner |
| Preceded by George Shaw-Lefevre | President of the Local Government Board; 1895–1900 | Succeeded by Walter Long |
Peerage of the United Kingdom
| New creation | Viscount Chaplin; 1916–1923 | Succeeded by Eric Chaplin |
