= John Cracroft-Amcotts =

English soldier and politician (1891–1956)

Lieutenant-Commander John Cracroft-Amcotts, DSC, DL, JP (3 January 1891 – 30 May 1956) was an English landowner, soldier and local politician, who served as vice-chairman of Kesteven County Council and High Sheriff of Lincolnshire.

== Early life and family ==
John Cracroft-Amcotts was born on 3 January 1891, the second of two sons of Major Frederick Augustus Cracroft-Amcotts, JP (1853–1897), of Kettlethorpe Hall in Lincolnshire, and his wife, Emily Grace (died 1936), JP, youngest daughter of Anthony Willson, of South Rauceby Hall, Lincolnshire; his elder brother was Sir Weston Cracroft-Amcotts, and his father was the son of Weston Cracroft Amcotts, a Member of Parliament for Mid-Lincolnshire.

Cracroft-Amcotts married, on 12 February 1930, May, widow of Frederic Martin Campbell and daughter of H. Redfearn-Shaw, an officer in the Malayan Civil Service; they had three daughters: Barbara Anne (born 1932, married Peter Hugh Davies), Erica Sylvia (born and died 1934) and Gillian Verity (1936–2019).

== Career ==
Following schooling at Aysgarth and Stubbington, Cracroft-Amcotts trained on HMS Britannia. He enrolled as a midshipman in the Royal Navy on 15 May 1907, and was promoted to sub-lieutenant on 15 September 1910, and lieutenant on 15 September 1913. Cracroft-Amcotts served in Europe during World War I and, on 1 October 1917, received the Distinguished Service Cross; he was also mentioned in dispatches twice. He was promoted to be emergency Lieutenant-Commander on 15 September 1921.

After being placed on the retired list of the Royal Navy, Cracroft-Amcotts went to Malaya, where he planted rubber. In 1931 he received Rauceby Hall and the connected estate by deed and gift. Three years later, he became a County Councillor for Kesteven and was elected an Alderman in 1950. In 1955, he became vice-chairman of the council and served till his death. Cracroft-Amcotts also served as a Justice of the Peace (from 1933), High Sheriff of Lincolnshire (in 1937) and a Deputy Lieutenant of the county (from 1951), as well as chairman and then president of the Grantham and Sleaford Divisional Conservative Association.

A keen angler, shooter, carpenter and painter, Cracroft-Amcotts carved and painted the shield of Kesteven County Council and presented it to hang in the authority's chamber. He died on 30 May 1956.

Preceded by Frank Jenkinson	Vice-Chairman of Kesteven County Council; 1955 – 1956	Succeeded by H. W. N. Fane
