= Royal Commission on the Depressed Condition of the Agricultural Interests (1879–1882) =

The Royal Commission on the Depressed Condition of the Agricultural Interests was appointed by Benjamin Disraeli's Conservative government in 1879 in response to the depression in British agriculture. It was chaired by the Duke of Richmond and is sometimes called the Richmond Commission. It submitted its final report in 1882.

After the particularly bad harvest of 1879, the Conservative MP and landlord Henry Chaplin requested that a royal commission be appointed. Its Final Report noted the disadvantages that farmers suffered, including burdens such as tithes, local rates, the increasing cost of farm labour, rising rents and railway rates that favoured imports. It recommended a shift in the local tax burden from real property to the consolidated fund and argued for a government department for agriculture. The government eventually set up a Board of Agriculture in 1889, with Chaplin its first President.
