= 1907 Wimbledon by-election =

UK Parliamentary by-election

- 14 May 1907

Candidate	Chaplin	Russell
Party	Conservative	Independent Liberal
Popular vote	10,263	3,299
Percentage	75.7%	24.3%
MP before election
Eric Hambro
Conservative
Subsequent MP
Henry Chaplin
Conservative

The 1907 Wimbledon by-election was held on 14 May 1907. The by-election was held due to the resignation of the incumbent Conservative MP, Eric Hambro, due to expanded business interests. It was won by the Conservative candidate Henry Chaplin, who defeated Independent Liberal candidate Bertrand Russell. Russell campaigned in support of women's suffrage.

Wimbledon by-election, 1907
Party	Candidate	Votes	%	±%
Conservative	Henry Chaplin	10,263	75.7	+19.5
Independent Liberal	Bertrand Russell	3,299	24.3	New
Majority		6,694	51.4	+39.0
Turnout		13,562	57.2	−20.1
Registered electors		23,702		
Conservative hold		Swing		
