= Sleaford (constituency) =

Parliamentary constituency in the United Kingdom (1885–1918)

- Former county constituency for the House of Commons
- County: Lincolnshire
- Major settlements: Sleaford

1885–1918
- Seats: One
- Created from: Mid Lincolnshire
- Replaced by: Grantham and Rutland and Stamford

Sleaford was a county constituency in Lincolnshire, centred on the town of Sleaford. It returned one Member of Parliament (MP) to the House of Commons of the Parliament of the United Kingdom.

The constituency was created for the 1885 general election, when the former Mid Lincolnshire constituency was divided under the Redistribution of Seats Act 1885. It was abolished for the 1918 general election.

== Members of Parliament ==
Election	Member	Party
1885	Henry Chaplin	Conservative
1906	Arnold Lupton	Liberal
January 1910	Edmund Royds	Conservative
1918	constituency abolished	

== Election results ==
=== Elections in the 1880s ===
General election 1885: Sleaford
Party	Candidate	Votes	%	±%
Conservative	Henry Chaplin	4,761	57.9	
Liberal	Charles Sharpe	3,460	42.1	
Majority		1,301	15.8	
Turnout		8,221	83.4	
Registered electors		9,863		
Conservative win (new seat)				

General election 1886: Sleaford
Party	Candidate	Votes	%	±%
Conservative	Henry Chaplin	Unopposed		
Conservative hold				

Chaplin was appointed President of the Board of Agriculture, requiring a by-election.

By-election, 26 Sep 1889: Sleaford
Party	Candidate	Votes	%	±%
Conservative	Henry Chaplin	4,386	58.8	N/A
Liberal	Francis Otter	3,078	41.2	New
Majority		1,308	17.6	N/A
Turnout		7,464	76.2	N/A
Registered electors		9,793		
Conservative hold		Swing	N/A	

=== Elections in the 1890s ===
General election 1892: Sleaford
Party	Candidate	Votes	%	±%
Conservative	Henry Chaplin	4,157	56.1	N/A
Liberal	William Shearburn Fox	3,250	43.9	N/A
Majority		907	12.2	N/A
Turnout		7,407	77.7	N/A
Registered electors		9,528		
Conservative hold		Swing	N/A	

Chaplin was appointed President of the Local Government Board, requiring a by-election.

By-election, 6 Jul 1895: Sleaford
Party	Candidate	Votes	%	±%
Conservative	Henry Chaplin	Unopposed		
Conservative hold				

General election 1895: Sleaford
Party	Candidate	Votes	%	±%
Conservative	Henry Chaplin	4,653	63.4	+7.3
Liberal	William Shearburn Fox	2,687	36.6	−7.3
Majority		1,966	26.8	+14.6
Turnout		7,340	75.9	−1.8
Registered electors		9,671		
Conservative hold		Swing	+7.3	

=== Elections in the 1900s ===
General election 1900: Sleaford
Party	Candidate	Votes	%	±%
Conservative	Henry Chaplin	4,228	60.3	−3.1
Liberal	Charles Emmanuel Reinhardt	2,785	39.7	+3.1
Majority		1,443	20.6	−6.2
Turnout		7,013	71.1	−4.8
Registered electors		9,870		
Conservative hold		Swing	−3.1	

Lupton

General election 1906: Sleaford
Party	Candidate	Votes	%	±%
Liberal	Arnold Lupton	4,355	51.7	+12.0
Conservative	Henry Chaplin	4,062	48.3	−12.0
Majority		293	3.4	N/A
Turnout		8,417	84.2	+13.1
Registered electors		10,000		
Liberal gain from Conservative		Swing	+12.0	

=== Elections in the 1910s ===
General election January 1910: Sleaford
Party	Candidate	Votes	%	±%
Conservative	Edmund Royds	5,265	56.8	+8.5
Liberal	Arnold Lupton	4,000	43.2	−8.5
Majority		1,265	13.6	N/A
Turnout		9,265	89.2	+5.0
Conservative gain from Liberal		Swing	+8.5	

General election December 1910: Sleaford
Party	Candidate	Votes	%	±%
Conservative	Edmund Royds	Unopposed		
Conservative hold				

General Election 1914–15:

Another General Election was required to take place before the end of 1915. The political parties had been making preparations for an election to take place and by July 1914, the following candidates had been selected;

- Unionist: Edmund Royds
- Liberal: Robert Pattinson
