= Arnold Lupton =

British politician and mining engineer

- Born: 11 September 1846
- Died: 23 May 1930 (aged 83)
- Occupation(s): Politician and mining engineer

Arnold Lupton (11 September 1846 – 23 May 1930) was a British Liberal Party Member of Parliament, academic, anti-vaccinationist, mining engineer and a managing director (collieries). He was jailed for pacifist activity during the First World War.

== Career ==
Lupton was articled to Woodhouse and Jeffcock, civil and mining engineers in Derby and became Professor of Coal Mining, at the Yorkshire College from 1878 to 1899 and an examiner in Mine Surveying for the City and Guilds of London Institute. The Royal Coal Commission employed him to prepare maps, sections and estimates of coal reserves in Yorkshire, Derbyshire and Nottinghamshire.

Lupton, the first managing director of the Shirebrook Colliery Company in 1894, was a controversial figure. He left Shirebrook four years later after a 17-week miners' strike because of poor working conditions and low wages. Blackleg miners from Glasgow and Wales were brought to replace them but after they were sent home, Lupton resigned.

After leaving Shirebrook, Lupton continued working in the technical and mechanical running of collieries and authored books and pamphlets. He was subsequently the consulting engineer and manager at Highfield Colliery, Oakerthorpe in Chesterfield and resident engineer and manager at Bettisfield Colliery. He was consulting engineer and manager of Manston, New Hall, Fieldhouse, and Rock Collieries. As engineer and managing director, he planned work for Tinsley Park Colliery and obtained leases for Yorkshire Main, Maltby Main and Harworth Main Collieries. He inspected coal and other mines and quarries in Britain, Europe, the United States, Australia and India and was an expert witness in Parliamentary and Arbitration cases. He was awarded the Silver Medal of the Order of St John of Jerusalem for saving life in a mine when he saved two persons after an explosion at Wharncliffe Colliery, Barnsley in 1883.

Lupton published many papers on mining and three books, Mining, Mine Surveying and Electricity as Applied to Mining, in conjunction with Parr and Perkin. Outside mining he developed Niagara Water Power for which he was awarded a prize by the International Commission. He obtained Acts of Parliament for Yorkshire Electric Power and for Derby and Nottingham Electric Power.

=== Harworth Colliery and the German connection ===
In 1907, George Monckton-Arundell, 7th Viscount Galway was keen to exploit the coal under his Serlby Estate in Nottinghamshire. Leases changed hands several times before being granted to Arnold Lupton in 1910. Lupton then had to raise an estimated £450,000 to develop Harworth Colliery and made several promises to Viscount Galway that capital would be forthcoming and a prospectus to raise £500,000 in shares of £1 was drawn up in 1912. The promised capital was not forthcoming and Lupton, facing a crisis, turned to Hugo Stinnes, a German industrialist. In 1913 Lupton leased the coal to Stinnes for £2,000 and played a part in establishing the Anglo-German owned Northern Union Mining Company to develop the colliery on the Serlby Estate. Development started and Germans who worked there were interned during the First World War. In 1922 Lupton had still not been paid and claimed the money from his pre-war deal in an arbitration court. Stinnes had refused to pay but the court ruled in Lupton's favour and he received his money, interest and costs. When Lupton's dealings with Germans were leaked after the horrors of the war, public opinion was not favourable.

== Politics ==
Lupton was elected in 1906 as the Member of Parliament (MP) for the Sleaford division of Lincolnshire, defeating the Conservative MP Henry Chaplin who had represented Sleaford and its predecessor seat since 1868. Whilst an MP, Lupton had the opportunity to vote for the 1908 Women's Enfranchisement Bill but he neither spoke nor voted in the debate. He supported Free Trade and laissez-faire economics.

Lupton's record, in parliamentary debates and international press reports, highlights his strained relationship with Prime Minister H. H. Asquith and opposition leader Arthur Balfour over compulsory vaccination and conscription, the Union of South Africa and Asquith's Land Tax policy (1912). In 1926 Lupton lobbied the Minister of Health, Neville Chamberlain, to abolish compulsory vaccination. The prolific Lupton wrote much to fellow Liberal MPs, including Winston Churchill, and campaigners such as Bertrand Russell, on these issues. Lupton's political views were not always appreciated by his fellow parliamentarians. In 1909, George V, (then Prince of Wales), was "in the gallery when Professor Arnold Lupton got to his feet to speak". Although he remained to listen to Lupton's speech, the press reported that, "so great was the turmoil of men rushing to the lobby that it was impossible to hear what the member of Sleaford was saying".

Alongside Liberal Home Secretary, Herbert Gladstone, 1st Viscount Gladstone, Lupton was an associate of the Balkan Committee which had been founded in 1906 by Radical Liberal Cabinet Minister James Bryce, 1st Viscount Bryce.

Lupton was defeated at the January 1910 election by the Conservative Edmund Royds and did not contest the December 1910 General Election when Royds was returned unopposed. A pacifist, Lupton was opposed to Britain's participation in the First World War. He wrote pamphlets expressing his pacifist views. Voluntary Service versus Compulsory Service was written in September 1915 when inciting pacifism was an offence. He was imprisoned for six months for distributing pacifist leaflets activities considered prejudicial to recruiting in February 1918. When he visited Ireland in October 1917, a special notice by the Omagh Royal Irish Constabulary was issued requesting that a "discreet watch be kept on Sir Arnold Lupton" because of his well known anti-conscription views.

Lupton contested Plaistow at the 1918 General Election presenting himself as a 'Liberal and Temperance' candidate. His decision to stand may have been influenced by his Labour opponent, an out-spoken supporter of the war who supported conscription, putting him at odds with his local party. Lupton failed to gain backing from local organised labour or the Liberal Party and was beaten heavily, winning only 5.1% of the votes.

After the war, the coalition government was attacked from the right by politicians and newspaper proprietors advocating retrenchment policies and opposition to government waste. Lupton had some sympathy with this view. At the Westminster Abbey by-election in 1921, he was selected as the Liberal Party candidate and presented himself as the 'Liberal and Anti-waste' candidate but his opponents also presented themselves in this way. No candidate was prepared to support the Coalition government. Finishing third, Lupton exceeded all expectations by polling 3,053 votes, the highest vote ever polled by a Liberal in either Westminster division.

Lupton did not stand for parliament again. He was well known on the international stage, visiting the United States of America, India, Ireland, Australia and other countries as a lecturer on mining and political campaigner. The New York Times reported that this "celebrated parliamentarian" had plans to rid London of its famous smog in 1906.

After Lupton's death aged 83 in 1930, he left a portion of his estate to the National Liberal Club, where as a member, he had often given lectures, and a luncheon was given to his mourners.

== Family ==
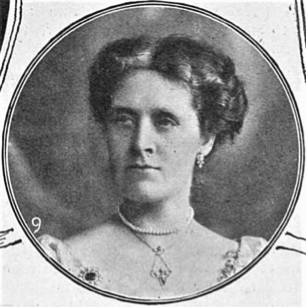
Jessie Lupton in 1909, President of the Sleaford Women’s Liberal Association

Arnold Lupton was the son of Arthur Lupton, (1819–1867) and Elizabeth Wicksteed. His father was a Unitarian minister and member of the Lupton family of Leeds. His mother's brother was the Rev Charles Wicksteed, a minister at Mill Hill Chapel in Leeds. The Wicksteeds were "Unitarians of vigorous mind and keen intelligence".

Lupton's wife, Jessie Lupton (née Ramsden, 1859-1938) was president of the Sleaford Women’s Liberal Association in 1909.

== Beliefs ==
Lupton was a teetotaller and supported the temperance movement. He was an anti-vaccinationist believing that vaccines were dangerous and the Government should dissociate itself from supporting their use. Lupton was a member of the executive council of the National Anti-Vaccination League and contributed £100 a year to the league and between £500 and £900 for anti-vaccination activities. Lupton authored the booklet Vaccination and the State, published in 1921.

== Sources ==
- Lupton, C. A. (1965). The Lupton Family in Leeds. Wm. Harrison and Son.

Parliament of the United Kingdom
Preceded by Henry Chaplin	Member of Parliament for Sleaford; 1906 – Jan 1910	Succeeded by Edmund Royds
