= Kesteven County Council =

Former county council in England

History
- Founded: 1 April 1889
- Disbanded: 31 March 1974
- Succeeded by: Lincolnshire County Council

Meeting place
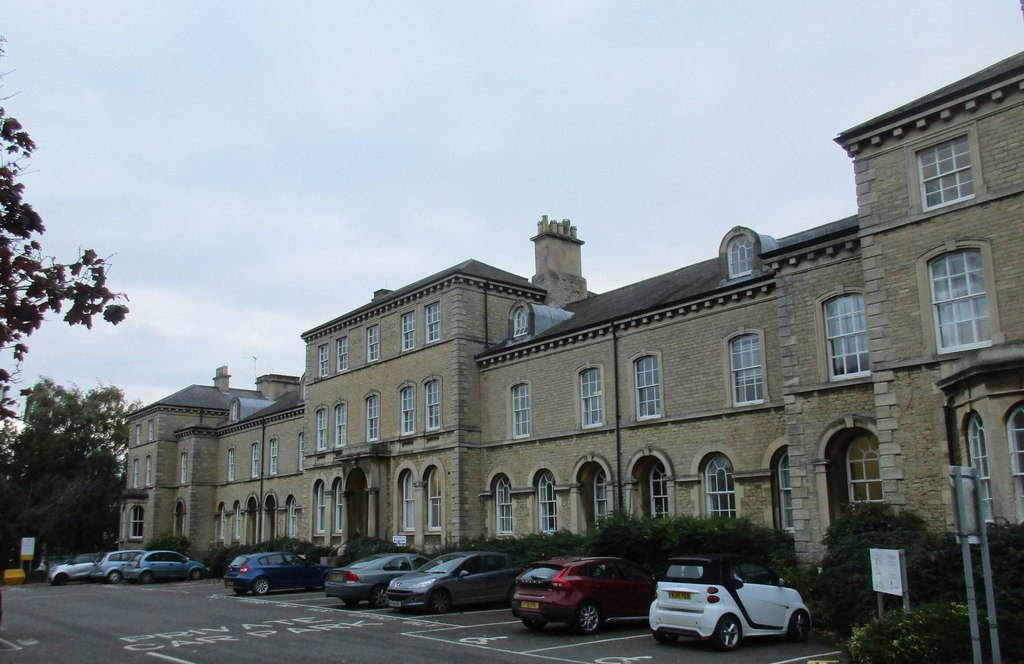
- County Offices, Sleaford

Kesteven County Council was the county council of Kesteven, one of the three Parts of Lincolnshire in eastern England. It came into its powers on 1 April 1889 and was abolished on 31 March 1974. The county council was based at the County Offices in Sleaford. It was amalgamated with Holland County Council, Lindsey County Council and the county borough of Lincoln to form the new Lincolnshire County Council in 1974.

== History ==
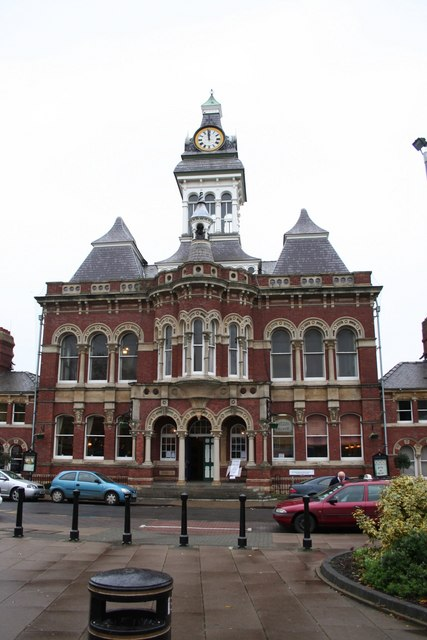
Grantham Guildhall, one of the council's two main meeting places.

Elected county councils were created in 1889, taking over the administrative functions of the quarter sessions. Lincolnshire's quarter sessions had long been held separately for the three parts of the county and the city of Lincoln, and so each part became a separate administrative county and Lincoln became a county borough. Elections were held in January 1889 and the council came into its powers on 1 April 1889, on which day it held its first formal meeting at Grantham Guildhall. William Welby-Gregory, a former Member of Parliament for the Conservatives, was appointed the first chairman of the council. At the first meeting there was a debate on where the council should meet, with some advocating meeting solely in Grantham, others arguing for alternating meetings between Grantham and Sleaford, and others advocating a four way cycle of meetings between Grantham, Sleaford, Stamford and Bourne. The council decided to alternate between meeting at Grantham Guildhall and Sessions House, Sleaford.

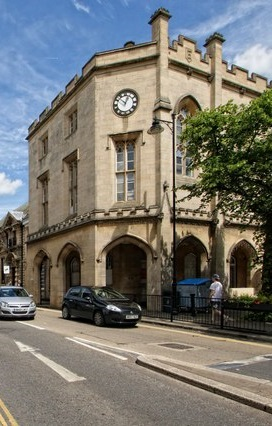
Sessions House, Sleaford, the council's other main meeting place.

In 1925 the council bought Lafford Terrace, a row of 1850s houses on Kesteven Street in Sleaford, converting it to become their main offices. Plans to add a council chamber to the building were considered but not pursued, and council meetings continued to alternate between Grantham Guildhall and the Sessions House in Sleaford throughout the council's existence.

== Chairmen and vice-chairmen ==
=== Chairmen ===
| Chairman | Party | From | To |
|---|---|---|---|
| William Welby-Gregory | Conservative | 1889 | 1898 |
| John Thorold | Conservative | 1898 | 1921 |
| Charles Welby | Conservative | 1921 | 1934 |
| Robert Pattinson | Liberal | 1934 | 1954 |
| Frank Jenkinson | Conservative | 1954 | 1962 |
| Henry William Newman Fane | Conservative | 1962 | 1967 |
| John Hedley Lewis | Conservative | 1968 | 1974 |

=== Vice-chairmen ===
- 1889–98: Sir John Thorold, 12th Baronet.
- 1898–1904: Sir Hugh Cholmeley, 3rd Baronet.
- 1904–09: Valentine Stapleton.
- 1909–21: Sir Charles Welby, 5th Baronet.
- 1921–34: Robert Pattinson
- 1934–37: W. V. R. King-Fane
- 1937–40: J. H. Bowman
- 1940–55: F. J. Jenkinson
- 1955–56: John Cracroft-Amcotts
- 1957–62: H. W. N. Fane

== Coat of arms ==
Kesteven County Council received a grant of arms in 1950. The Lincoln green shield bears an ermine pale, representing the Roman Ermine Street which runs the length of the county. This is charged with an oak tree for the ancient forests, among them Kesteven Forest.

The crest shows a heron with a pike in its beak. The dexter supporter is a Roman legionary which recalls the Roman settlements of the county. The sinister supporter is a poacher, recalling the song "The Lincolnshire Poacher", an unofficial anthem of Lincolnshire.
