= Horncastle (disambiguation) =

Horncastle is a town in Lincolnshire, England.

Horncastle may also refer to:

== Places ==
- Horncastle (constituency), former constituency in Lincolnshire, England
- Horncastle, Berkshire, a suburb of Reading, England
- Horncastle, Ontario, Canada

== People ==
- James Horncastle, writer
- John Horncastle, a bishop
- Tristan Horncastle, songwriter
- William Horncastle, cricketer

== Other ==
- R v Horncastle [2009] UKSC 14, a decision of the UK Supreme Court

== See also ==
- Louth and Horncastle (UK Parliament constituency)
