= Paul Mayo =

English footballer (born 1981)

Personal information
- Date of birth: 13 October 1981 (age 45)
- Place of birth: Lincoln, Lincolnshire, England
- Position: Defender

Youth career
- Lincoln City

Senior career*
Years	Team	Apps	(Gls)
1999–2004	Lincoln City	106	(6)
2002–2003	→ Dagenham & Redbridge (loan)	3	(1)
2004–2005	Watford	25	(0)
2005–2007	Lincoln City	57	(4)
2007–2009	Notts County	41	(0)
2008	→ Darlington (loan)	7	(1)
2009	Mansfield Town	12	(1)
2009–2010	Corby Town		
2010–2011	Gainsborough Trinity		
2011–2012	Corby Town		
2012–2013	Stamford		
2013	Boston United		
2013–2014	Lincoln United		
- * Club domestic league appearances and goals as of 19:27, 10 February 2009 (UTC)

Paul Mayo (born 13 October 1981) is an English former professional footballer, who played as a defender.

He started his professional career with Lincoln City in 1999, and in 2004 after impressing in the clubs recent play-off campaigns he made a move to Watford. He returned to Lincoln in 2005 and moved on to Notts County in 2007 and later Darlington and Mansfield Town. He became a prime example of a promising player who peaked early on in his career and went on to play in Non-league football with Corby Town, Gainsborough Trinity, Stamford and Boston United. He finished his playing career with Lincoln United during the 2013–14 season.

== Career ==
=== Lincoln City ===
Mayo was educated in Lincolnshire at Robert Pattinson School. He started his career at Lincoln City, playing over 100 times for the club and featuring in their Division Three play-off semi-final defeat to AFC Bournemouth in the 2002–03 season. Whilst in his first spell with the club Mayo made a name for himself while under the management tenure of Keith Alexander.

=== Watford ===
In March 2004 he was signed by Division One side Watford for £65,000. Replacing Paul Robinson, who had been sold to West Brom the previous autumn, he played regularly for the remainder of the 2003–04 season. He started in the side the next season, but dropped out of the side in October and only played twice more for the club.

=== Return to Lincoln City ===
He was allowed to return to Lincoln at the end of the 2004–05 season. Mayo would feature in the Lincoln side that made the League Two play-offs at the end of 2005–06 and 2006–07 seasons. In the summer of 2007 he turned down a new contract at Lincoln.

=== Notts County and Mansfield Town ===
Mayo would eventually sign for Notts County. Mayo played regularly during the first part of 2007–08, but nonetheless was loaned to another club in the same division, Darlington for a month in January 2008. He returned to the club and played further games that season. In January 2009 Mayo cancelled his contract with Notts County by mutual consent, feeling his chances of first team football were limited.

He subsequently joined Conference side Mansfield Town on a contract until the end of 2008–09 season.

=== Move into Non league ===
In the summer of 2009 Conference North side Corby Town came in for him. Mayo left the club at the end of the season.

In May 2010 he signed for Gainsborough Trinity but after a disappointing season in which the club narrowly avoided relegation to the Northern Premier League he was amongst a group of players released in May 2011. In June 2011 it was announced that he had rejoined former club Corby Town. Mayo signed for Stamford in May 2012. On 22 January 2012 Mayo moved back up the football pyramid when he joined Conference North side Boston United. In May 2013 he signed for Lincoln United. Mayo left the club at the end of the 2013–14 season and subsequently retired.

== Personal life ==
Mayo works as a Police officer for Lincolnshire Police Mayo also has 3 children named grace, holly and isabelle. .
