= Valentine Stapleton =

English politician (died 1911)

Valentine Stapleton (died 16 July 1911) was an English local politician who served as Vice-Chairman of Kesteven County Council and Mayor of Stamford, Lincolnshire.

== Career ==
Stapleton was admitted a solicitor in 1863 and practised in and around the Lincolnshire town of Stamford for over 40 years, eventually as a partner in Stapleton and Son. He was clerk to Law and Hutcheson's Charity in King's Cliffe and to the village's schools. He also owned Market Deeping Brewery, which he eventually sold, and went to live in Deeping around 1898.

Stapleton was a staunch Conservative and took an active role in local politics. For many years, he sat on Stamford's borough council and served as the town's Mayor in 1893. At parliamentary elections, he supported Sir John Lawrance, Sir John Hay, Henry Cust, William Younger, Lord John Joicey-Cecil and Hon. Claud Willoughby. After Hay's electoral victory, a violent crowd of Liberal supporters took to the streets of Stamford and began damaging the property of local Conservatives; Stapleton stood in his doorway and asked them to stone him rather than disturb his family by vandalising his home; the crowd instead cheered him for his courage and moved along.

Stapleton also sat on Kesteven County Council as an alderman. He unsuccessfully contested the Stamford St George division at the Council's inception in 1889, but was elected an alderman at the Council's first meeting in February 1889, finishing joint sixth with 24 votes; he would have to stand again in 1895. He was duly re-elected in 1895, 1901, and 1907. He was elected its Vice-Chairman in 1904, following the death of Sir Hugh Cholmeley, 3rd Baronet. As his health began to deteriorate, he stepped down in 1909, being succeeded by Sir Charles Welby, 5th Baronet. He tendered his resignation from the Council entirely, although other members implored him to remain, which he did. He was largely inactive on the Council for the last couple of years of his life.

Described as a "fluent speaker" with "sound business judgement" whose "opinions, especially on financial matters, invariably carried great weight", Stapleton died at his home in Market Deeping on 16 July 1911, aged 72, leaving a widow, Sarah Ellen. His son, Valentine George Stapleton (died 1929), was a solicitor and Coroner for Stamford and Rutland; his other sons were Harvey and Arthur Leslie Stapleton, and his daughter was Ellen August Stapleton. His estate was valued at over £8,000.

Preceded by Sir Hugh Cholmeley, 3rd Baronet	Vice-Chairman of Kesteven County Council; 1904 – 1909	Succeeded by Sir Charles Welby, 5th Baronet
