= Weston Cracroft Amcotts =

English Liberal politician

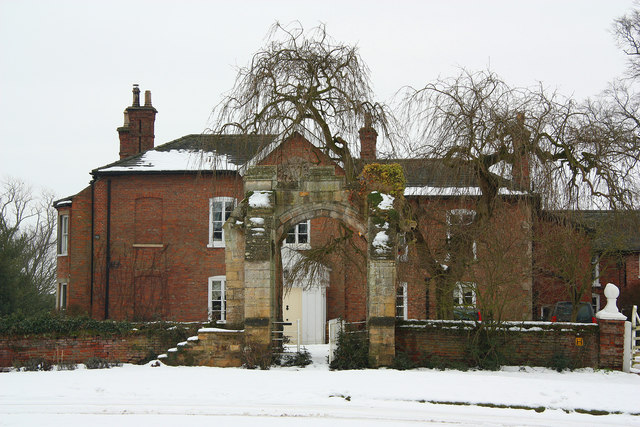
Kettlethorpe Hall today

Weston Cracroft Amcotts (9 March 1815 – 14 July 1883) was an English Liberal Party politician who sat in the House of Commons from 1868 to 1874.

Amcotts was born William Cracroft, son of Robert Cracroft of Hackthorn and his wife Augusta Ingilby, daughter of Sir John Ingilby, 1st Baronet. He was educated at Eton College. In 1855 he assumed by Royal licence the name of Amcotts when he inherited Kettlethorpe Hall in Lincolnshire from his uncle Sir William Amcotts-Ingilby, 2nd Baronet. He then inherited Hackthorn Hall from his father in 1862 but chose to live at Kettlethorpe after renovating it in 1863. He was a Deputy Lieutenant for Lincolnshire and a J.P. for Lindsey, Lincolnshire and was High Sheriff of Lincolnshire for 1861–62.

He was a major in the Royal North Lincoln Militia and the Lieutenant-colonel of the 1st Battalion Lincolnshire Rifle Volunteers.

At the 1868 general election Amcotts was elected Member of Parliament for Mid Lincolnshire. He held the seat until 1874.

Amcotts died at the age of 68 and was succeeded by his eldest surviving son.

== Family ==
Amcotts married firstly (on 16 May 1844) Emma, second daughter of William George Cherry, of Buckland, Herefordshire, and had three sons:

- Vincent (1845–1881), a Deputy Lieutenant for Lincolnshire and Justice of the Peace; he died unmarried before his father.
- Edward Weston Cracroft, DL, JP (1849–1933), who served as High Sheriff of Lincolnshire in 1893; he stopped using the surname Amcotts in 1885, and married Cicely Sophia Mary, only daughter of Henry Nevile, of Walcot Hall and Wellingore Hall, but died childless.
- Major Frederick Augustus Cracroft-Amcotts, JP (1853–1897), who married Emily Grace (died 1936), JP, youngest daughter of Anthony Willson, of Rauceby Hall, Lincolnshire; his two sons were Sir Weston Cracroft-Amcotts and Lieutenant Commander John Cracroft-Amcotts.

Amcotts married secondly, on 21 April 1864, Ellen, widow of Henry Nevile, of Wellingore, and daughter of Rev. Charles Bryne.

Parliament of the United Kingdom
New constituency	Member of Parliament for Mid Lincolnshire; 1868 – 1874; With: Henry Chaplin	Succeeded by Edward Stanhope; Henry Chaplin
