= Edward Stanhope =

British politician (1840–1893)

The Right Honourable Edward Stanhope PC
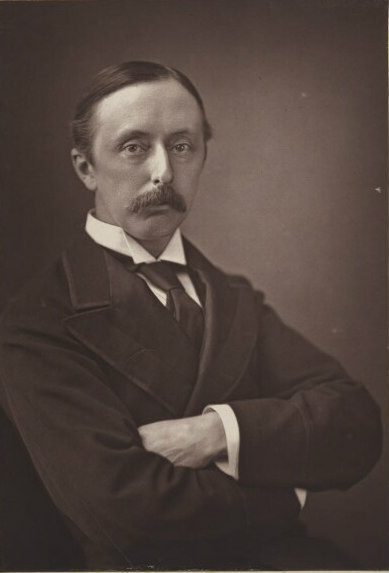
- Stanhope in 1881

President of the Board of Trade
- In office 19 August 1885 – 28 January 1886
- Monarch: Victoria
- Prime Minister: The Marquess of Salisbury
- Preceded by: The Duke of Richmond
- Succeeded by: A. J. Mundella

Secretary of State for the Colonies
- In office 3 August 1886 – 14 January 1887
- Monarch: Victoria
- Prime Minister: The Marquess of Salisbury
- Preceded by: The Earl Granville
- Succeeded by: Sir Henry Holland, Bt

Secretary of State for War
- In office 14 January 1887 – 11 August 1892
- Monarch: Victoria
- Prime Minister: The Marquess of Salisbury
- Preceded by: W. H. Smith
- Succeeded by: Sir Henry Campbell-Bannerman

Personal details
- Born: 24 September 1840 Belgravia, London
- Died: 21 December 1893 (aged 53) Chevening, Sevenoaks, Kent
- Party: Conservative
- Parent(s): Philip Stanhope, 5th Earl Stanhope; Emily Harriet
- Education: Christ Church, Oxford

Edward Stanhope PC (24 September 1840 – 21 December 1893) was a British Conservative Party politician who was Secretary of State for War from 1887 to 1892.

== Background and education ==
Born in Belgravia in London in 1840, Stanhope was the second son of Philip Stanhope, 5th Earl Stanhope, by his wife Emily Harriet, daughter of General Sir Edward Kerrison, 1st Baronet. Arthur Stanhope, 6th Earl Stanhope, was his elder brother and Philip Stanhope, 1st Baron Weardale, his younger brother.

Educated at Harrow School, where he was in the cricket XI in 1857, and Christ Church, Oxford, Stanhope studied law, being called to the bar at the Inner Temple in 1865. He played some cricket at university without making the Oxford First XI, but in 1861 played a single first-class cricket match for Kent County Cricket Club. He played regularly for amateur teams such as I Zingari and Free Foresters. In 1879, he made two further first-class appearances, one for the Gentlemen of the South and the last for I Zingari. He played association football at school and remained a "keen fisherman and high class shot" throughout his life.

== Political career ==
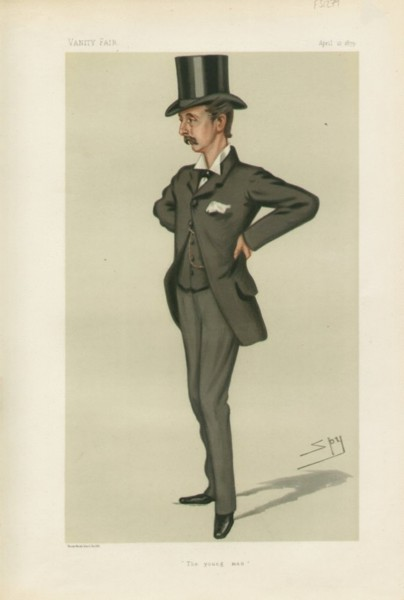
Caricature by Spy published in Vanity Fair in 1879.

In 1874 Stanhope was elected to the House of Commons for Mid Lincolnshire, a seat he held until 1885, and then represented Horncastle until his death. He soon rose to a position of prominence within the party. In 1875, he became Parliamentary Secretary to the Board of Trade, and in 1878 moved up to Under-Secretary of State for India, where he was a key assistant to India Secretary Lord Cranbrook.

After the Tories' fall from power in 1880, Stanhope supported Commons leader Sir Stafford Northcote against younger Tories led by Lord Randolph Churchill in internal Conservative party squabbling. When the Conservatives returned to the power, Stanhope became vice-president of the Committee of Council on Education, with a seat in the cabinet, and almost immediately thereafter President of the Board of Trade. He moved up to major cabinet office in Salisbury's second government, serving first as Colonial Secretary from 1886 to 1887 and then as Secretary of State for War from 1887 to 1892 following a cabinet reshuffle in January 1887.

As War Secretary, Stanhope fought for reform against the reactionary high officers – most notably the Duke of Cambridge, the Commander in Chief, and Sir Garnet Wolseley, the Adjutant-General. In spite of his own inexperience in military affairs and this formidable opposition, Stanhope achieved a fair amount, although it was his Liberal successor, Henry Campbell-Bannerman, who managed to push Cambridge into retirement.

== Personal life ==
Stanhope married Lucy Constance Egerton at Eaton Square in 1870 (Lucy was the granddaughter of Wilbraham Egerton of Tatton Park). The couple had no children. In December 1893, Stanhope died suddenly of a heart attack, aged 53 whilst visiting his brother at the family estate of Chevening. His wife established a scholarship at Harrow in his name in 1895.

== Bibliography ==
- Carlaw, Derek (2020). Kent County Cricketers, A to Z: Part One (1806–1914) (PDF). Cardiff: ACS.

Parliament of the United Kingdom
Preceded by Weston Cracroft Amcotts; Henry Chaplin	Member of Parliament for Mid Lincolnshire; 1874–1885; With: Henry Chaplin	Constituency abolished
New constituency	Member of Parliament for Horncastle; 1885–1893	Succeeded by Lord Willoughby de Eresby
Political offices
Preceded by George Cavendish-Bentinck	Parliamentary Secretary to the Board of Trade; 1875–1878	Succeeded by John Gilbert Talbot
Preceded by Lord George Hamilton	Under-Secretary of State for India; 1878–1880	Succeeded by The Marquess of Lansdowne
Preceded by A. J. Mundella	Vice-President of the Council; 1885	Succeeded by Sir Henry Holland, Bt
Preceded by The Duke of Richmond	President of the Board of Trade; 1885–1886	Succeeded by A. J. Mundella
Preceded by The Earl Granville	Secretary of State for the Colonies; 1886–1887	Succeeded by Sir Henry Holland, Bt
Preceded by W. H. Smith	Secretary of State for War; 1887–1892	Succeeded by Sir Henry Campbell-Bannerman
