= Edmund Royds =

British politician

Sir Edmund Royds, OBE, DL (6 July 1860 – 31 March 1946) was an English solicitor and Conservative Party politician. He practised law in London, and held a country seat in Lincolnshire, from where he was returned to the House of Commons from 1910 to 1922, and held numerous local offices.

== Early life ==
Royds was the son of the Reverend Francis Coulman Royds, who had been rector of Coddington and Canon of Chester. His mother was Cornelia Frances née Blomfield, daughter of Canon G. B. Blomfield of Mollington Hall in Cheshire. His wife's family was known for "architects, admirals, and bishops". His sister Norah was educated at the Slade School of art, and married Gribble, setting up home first at Henlow Grange; this made Edmund Royds the uncle of several notable people.

He was educated at Haileybury, and admitted as a solicitor in 1882.

== Career ==
Royds became a partners in the solicitors firm of Royds, Rawstone & Co, of 46 Bedford Square, London. He was also a director of the Lukwah Tea Company, and of the Life Association of Scotland. He joined the Lincolnshire Yeomanry in as a Lieutenant in 1903, and became a Major in 1910. He was a Lieutenant-Colonel of the Lincolnshire Volunteers, becoming Lieutenant-Colonel and County Commandant of the Lincolnshire Regiment of the Territorial Force in 1917.

=== Sleaford ===
At the January 1910 general election he was elected as the Member of Parliament (MP) for the Sleaford division of Lincolnshire, defeating the sitting Liberal MP Sir Arnold Lupton on a swing of 8.5%. Royds was returned unopposed in December 1910, and held the seat until the division was abolished in boundary changes in 1918.

In his early years in Parliament, Royds was noted for his activism in opposition to the land tax valuation provisions which had been introduced in the 1909 "People's budget" by David Lloyd George. He was a member of the council of the Land Union, which had been founded in 1910 by Ernest Pretyman to unite "for mutual protection all those whose property or businesses are based on land in any form". Royds was chairman of the Land Union's legal committee, and in the Commons he repeatedly challenged the valuation process. In June 1912 he sought to reduce the budget of the Land Valuation Office, claiming that its imposed a heavy burden on land-owners and was producing valuations which include improvements rather than, as required, reflect the site value. He pressed his points on motions for the adjournment and questioned where the government was seeking a true valuation of the land. In 1913 he claimed that the valuation process had restricted the availability of credit to land-owners, resulting in a reduction in the number of small houses and cottages built for labourers. He claimed that government figures showed the number of new houses having fallen from an average of 107,000 a year under the previous government to 80,000 after 1906, and only 10,000 in 1910–11, but the government responded that such falls were common after revaluations.

In March 1913 he moved an amendment to the King's Speech, calling for the valuation methods to be brought into line with those promised in 1909–10.

=== Grantham ===
At the 1918 general election, Royds was elected as a Coalition Conservative for the Grantham division of Lincolnshire, and made an Officer of the Order of the British Empire (OBE) in 1919, but at the 1922 general election he faced a tougher contest.

Lincolnshire was a predominantly agricultural county, and Royds was chairman of the Lincolnshire Chamber of Agriculture, but the county's farmers were dissatisfied; The Times newspaper reported their stance as a "Farmer's Revolt" after promises made at the previous election had been broken. They had ploughed up grazing land to grow crops, but the guaranteed prices had not materialised, while ex-servicemen who had been allocated land after World War I found their holdings too small. The local National Farmers Union were not satisfied with the answers which Royds gave to their questions, and pledged their support to the Liberal candidate Robert Pattinson, whom Royds had beaten in 1918. Pattinson won the seat, with a majority of 428 votes (1.6%), and Royds did not stand for Parliament again.

== Retirement ==
Outside Parliament, Royds remained active in public life in Lincolnshire, becoming a Deputy Lieutenant of Lincolnshire in 1922, and served as High Sheriff of Lincolnshire in 1931. He wrote letters to The Times on agricultural matters, and remained as chair of the Chamber of Agriculture. In 1932 he described the development of canning as offering a "new vista" for farmers, noting that the county's canning factories were doubling their output every year.

In July 1939 it was announced in the King's Birthday Honours in 1939 that he was to be knighted, "for political and public services in Lincolnshire". The knighthood was conferred at St James's Palace on 17 July 1939.

=== Stubton Hall ===
In 1918 Royds had purchased Stubton Hall, a large estate at Stubton (near Newark-on-Trent) on the border of Lincolnshire and Nottinghamshire, from the estate of Sir Ralph Wilmont, Bt. The estate had a long history, having belonged to the Heron family from 1789 to 1854, and the 17th-century hall was extensively rebuilt in the early 19th century by Sir Robert Heron, 2nd Baronet, the MP for Great Grimsby. Royds set about his own big programme of repairs and alterations.

He enjoyed fox hunting, and the Belvoir Hunt met regularly at Stubton Hall in the 1920s and 1930s.

When he was 81, Royds placed the house for sale, but it remained unsold on his death and was subsequently acquired by Lincolnshire County Council, who turned it into a school.

The building was bought in the early 2000s by an American couple, who turned it into a wedding venue. In 2009 the restoration was he subject of a Channel 4 television programme in the series Ruth Watson's Hotel Rescue.

== Family ==
In 1889, Royds married Rachel Louisa Fane, (born 30 January 1869) daughter of Colonel Francis Fane of Fulbeck. Lady Royds died on 18 December 1943 at Stubton Hall, and their son, Anthony Fane Royds, died in 1945. Sir Edmund died on 31 March 1946, aged 85, at Stubton Hall. His funeral took place in Stubton, and a memorial service was held at St Peter's Church, Eaton Square, London.

Parliament of the United Kingdom
Preceded by Arnold Lupton	Member of Parliament for Sleaford; January 1910 – 1918	Constituency abolished
Preceded by Arthur Priestley	Member of Parliament for Grantham; 1918 – 1922	Succeeded by Robert Pattinson
Honorary titles
Preceded by Charles Francis Cracroft Jarvis	High Sheriff of Lincolnshire; 1931	Succeeded by Thomas Henry Haggas
