= Robert Pattinson (politician) =

British Liberal politician and businessman

Sir Robert Pattinson JP DL
- Born: Robert Pattinson; February 19, 1872; Ruskington, Lincolnshire, England
- Died: December 4, 1954 (aged 82); Lincoln, Lincolnshire, England
- Citizenship: United Kingdom
- Occupations: Politician and businessman
- Political party: Liberal
- Spouse: Catherine Lucy Pratt (d. 1917)

Sir Robert Pattinson, JP, DL (19 February 1872 – 4 December 1954) was a British Liberal politician and businessman. Pattinson joined his family's railway contracting firm after finishing school and was quickly appointed to senior positions. In 1900, he became chairman of Ruskington Urban District Council and four years later joined Kesteven County Council, eventually becoming an alderman and serving as its chairman for 20 years between 1934 and his death in 1954. He chaired the Sleaford Liberal Association (1900–18) and was nominated as the party's representative for Sleaford shortly before World War I broke out. He contested Grantham unsuccessfully in 1918, but was returned for the seat in 1922, serving until he was defeated in the following year's general election. Several other unsuccessful attempts at a parliamentary career followed. He chaired several bodies responsible for maintaining Lincolnshire's waterways, served as a magistrate for Kesteven and Lindsey and sat as Lincolnshire's High Sheriff in 1941. Knighted in 1934, Pattinson died aged 82 in 1954 after several years of illness.

== Background ==
Born on 19 February 1872, Robert Pattinson was the son of a contractor and businessman, William Pattinson, JP (1833–1906), and his wife Anne (1833–1916). His father ran (and had founded with brother Samuel) the successful building company Messrs. Pattinson and Son alongside serving as chairman of Ruskington Urban District Council and vice-president of the Sleaford Liberal Association. Robert's brother Samuel (d. 1924) was a Liberal Member of Parliament for Horncastle (1922–24), head of Messrs Pattinson and Co. Ltd, and a prominent member of Kesteven County Council. One of his sisters, Emmeline Taylor (d. 1937), became the first female Kesteven county councillor and alderman, while his other sister's husband Richard Winfrey was also a Liberal MP, for South West Norfolk (1906–23) and Gainsborough (1923–24). Their eldest brother, John (d. 1939), was involved in the family business, supervising contracts in Liverpool and the south of England, before moving back to Lincolnshire; he represented Heckington and Sleaford on the County Council, became a justice of the peace and served as vice-chairman of the Sleaford Bench.

Pattinson married Catherine Lucy Pratt (d. 1917), daughter of Henry Pratt of Lincoln in 1895. There were two sons and one daughter of the marriage: Henry Pattinson (died 1941), a captain in the Indian Army; William Pratt Pattinson, a solicitor and coroner for the Lincoln South District, who married Elaine Eva Higson Smith, daughter of Louis W. Smith, MP, of Lincoln; and Catherine Mary, who married, firstly, G. W. R. Russell, elder son of J. J. Russell, of Ballygasson House, High Sheriff of County Louth, and secondly, Wing Commander Colin Spencer Richardson, of Salisbury, son of Colonel Alan Richardson.

== Business career ==
After schooling at Carre's Grammar School and Abingdon School, Pattinson joined his father and uncle's railway contracting firm. Two years later, he oversaw a project to widen the Great Northern Railway between Finsbury Park and King's Cross. The partnership became Messrs W. Pattinson and Sons, Ltd., and Pattinson became a managing director, with responsibility for many of its large projects, and he also became a director in Messrs Pattinson and Co., Ltd, a company of merchants and shippers.

== Political career ==
=== Local government ===
Pattinson became chairman of the Ruskington Urban District Council in 1900. He was elected to Kesteven County Council in 1904, became an alderman in 1911 and served as its vice-chairman from 1923 until he was elected chairman in 1934, the year he was knighted. Pattinson served on the Lincolnshire County Committee for 50 years, and as chairman of the Witham and Steeping Rivers Catchment Board when it was formed in 1931; after World War II, he was appointed chairman of Lincolnshire River Board, and was appointed to be one of the original members of the River Board Areas Consultative Committee and a member Central Transport Board for Great Britain, 1948–54. Pattinson also served as the first chairman of the Lincolnshire Archives Committee, as a justice of the peace (for Kesteven from 1900 and Lindsey from 1930), and deputy lieutenant for Lincolnshire. He was appointed High Sheriff of Lincolnshire in 1941.

=== Parliament ===
In 1898, Pattinson became chairman of the Sleaford Division Liberal Association, serving until 1918. He was first chosen as Liberal candidate for Sleaford division in 1914. At the 1918 general election he unsuccessfully contested the Grantham division for the party. He was elected for Grantham at the 1922 general election, defeating the sitting Conservative MP, Edmund Royds by a majority of 425 votes. However, at the 1923 general election he was defeated by the new Conservative candidate Victor Warrender.

Pattinson stood unsuccessfully for Lincoln at the general election in 1929. In 1937 he was suggested as a possible National government candidate at the Holland with Boston by-election. As a well-known local man he was thought to be an acceptable candidate to both local Liberal and Conservative Associations. In fact he was reported to be the preferred candidate of the local Conservatives. The by-election was caused by the death of the sitting MP, Sir James Blindell. He had captured the seat for the Liberals in a by-election in 1929 and had later joined the Liberal Nationals. In the end Herbert Butcher of Peterborough, Chairman of the East Midlands Liberal National Area Council was chosen as the National Government candidate. Pattinson himself later formally joined the Liberal Nationals.

Electoral record

General election 1918: Grantham
Party	Candidate	Votes	%	±%
Unionist	Edmund Royds^{a}	9,972	48.4	−1.1
Liberal	Robert Pattinson	8,701	42.2	−8.3
Independent Labour	William Bilton Harris	1,927	9.4	n/a
Majority		1,271	6.2	
Turnout			58.1	
Unionist gain from Liberal		Swing		

^{a} endorsed by Coalition Government

General election 1922: Grantham
Party	Candidate	Votes	%	±%
Liberal	Robert Pattinson	11,723	41.4	−0.8
Unionist	Edmund Royds	11,295	39.8	−8.6
Labour	John Henry Jones	5,332	18.8	+9.4
Majority		428	1.6	
Turnout			79.5	+21.4
Liberal gain from Unionist		Swing	+3.9	

General election 1923: Grantham
Party	Candidate	Votes	%	±%
Unionist	Sir Victor Alexander George Anthony Warrender	12,552	43.5	+3.7
Liberal	Robert Pattinson	10,819	37.6	−3.8
Labour	Montague William Moore	5,440	18.9	+0.1
Majority		1,733	5.9	7.5
Turnout			79.1	−0.4
Unionist gain from Liberal		Swing	+3.7	

General election 1929: Lincoln
Party	Candidate	Votes	%	±%
Labour	Robert Arthur Taylor	15,176	43.6	+2.3
Unionist	Benjamin Garnet Lampard-Vachell	11,978	34.3	−6.8
Liberal	Robert Pattinson	7,719	22.1	+4.5
Majority		3,198	9.3	+9.1
Turnout			88.5	0.0
Labour hold		Swing	+4.5	

== Death ==
Pattinson died at his home, The Fosse House, in Lincoln on 2 December 1954 at the age of 82 years.

== See also ==
- Sir Robert Pattinson Academy

Parliament of the United Kingdom
Preceded by Edmund Royds	Member of Parliament for Grantham; 1922 – 1923	Succeeded by Victor Warrender
Other offices
Preceded by Sir Charles Welby, 5th Baronet	Vice-Chairman of Kesteven County Council; 1921 – 1934	Succeeded by William King-Fane
Preceded by Sir Charles Welby, 5th Baronet	Chairman of Kesteven County Council; 1934 – 1954	Succeeded by Frank Jenkinson
Preceded by Arthur Hovenden Worth	High Sheriff of Lincolnshire; 1941	Succeeded by Sir John Denton Marsden, 1st Baronet
