= J. H. Bowman =

English politician (died 1940)

Alderman J. H. Bowman MBE JP

Vice-chairman of Kesteven County Council
- In office 1937 – 6 November 1940

Personal details
- Born: James Henry Bowman
- Died: 6 November 1940 (aged 66)

James Henry Bowman (died 6 November 1940) was a local politician from the English county of Lincolnshire who served as vice-chairman of Kesteven County Council.

== Life ==
James Henry Bowman was the third son of Edward Bowman. He was a member of the building and contractors company Messrs Bowman and Sons in Stamford. Bowman was elected to Stamford Town Council in 1911 and elevated to alderman in 1926. He was a long-serving chairman of the Town Council's Finance Committee and was mayor of Stamford in 1926, 1927 and 1928.

Bowman was also elected to Kesteven County Council in 1917 and was made an alderman in 1931. In 1937, he was appointed its vice-chairman and served until his death. He was also chairman of its Education Committee and in 1938 was president of the East Midlands Educational Union.

In the First World War, he was a distribution officer for the Ministry of Food and a director of transport for the North Midland Division; he was appointed a Member of the Order of the British Empire in recognition of this service. During the General Strike of 1926, Bowman was a food officer. In 1926 he was also appointed a justice of the peace for Kesteven and three years later was made a magistrate for Stamford. He was a Liberal and chaired the Rutland and Stamford Divisional Liberal Association. Bowman died on 6 November 1940, aged 66.

Preceded by William Vere Reeve King-Fane	Vice-Chairman of Kesteven County Council; 1937 – 1940	Succeeded by Frank Jenkinson
