= William Horncastle =

English cricketer

William Allen Horncastle (21 September 1864 – 26 January 1917) was an English first-class cricketer active 1883 who played for Middlesex. He was born in Tottenham; died in Leyton.
