= South Rauceby Hall =

Grade II listed building in Lincolnshire, England

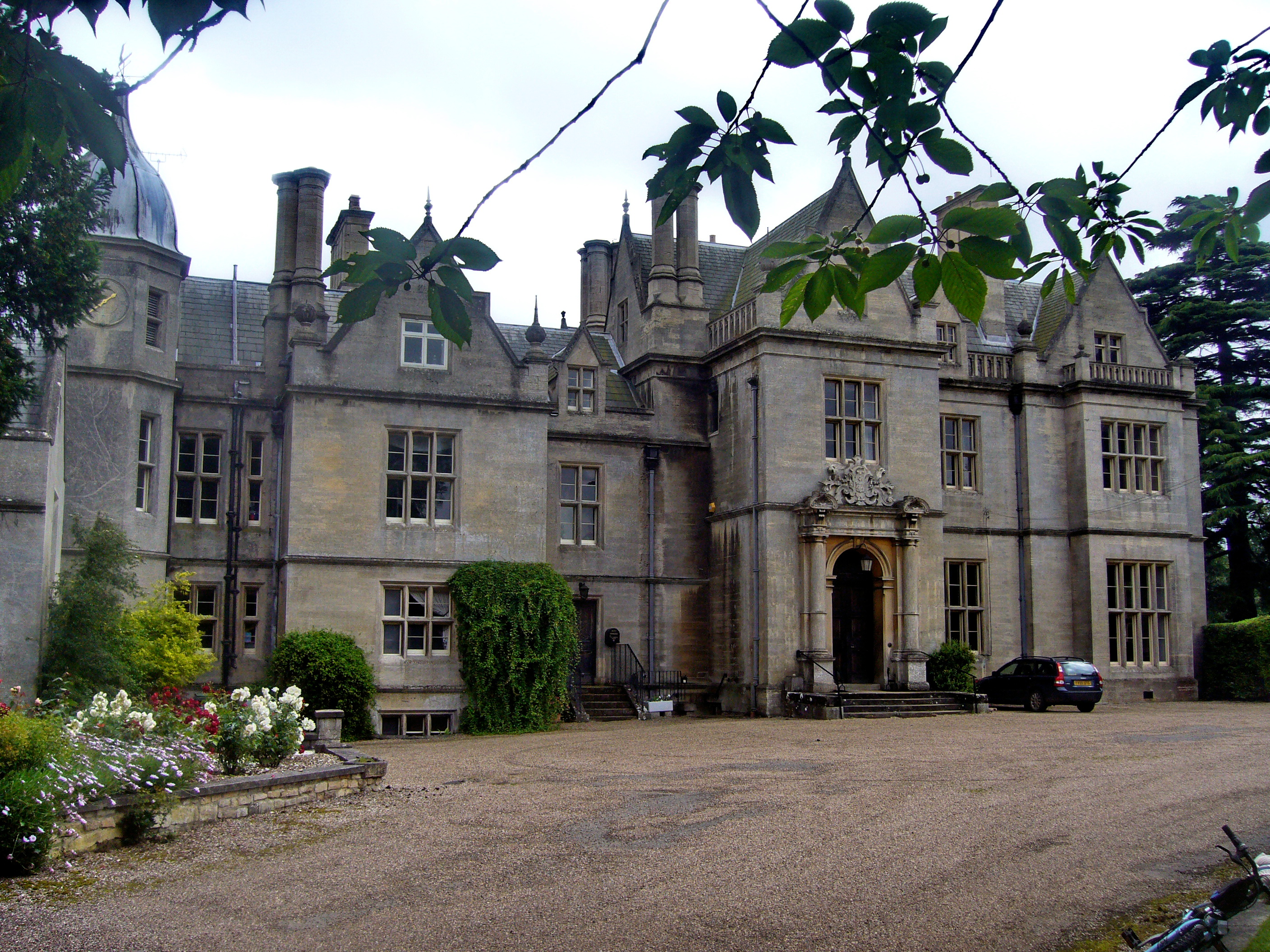
- The entrance front

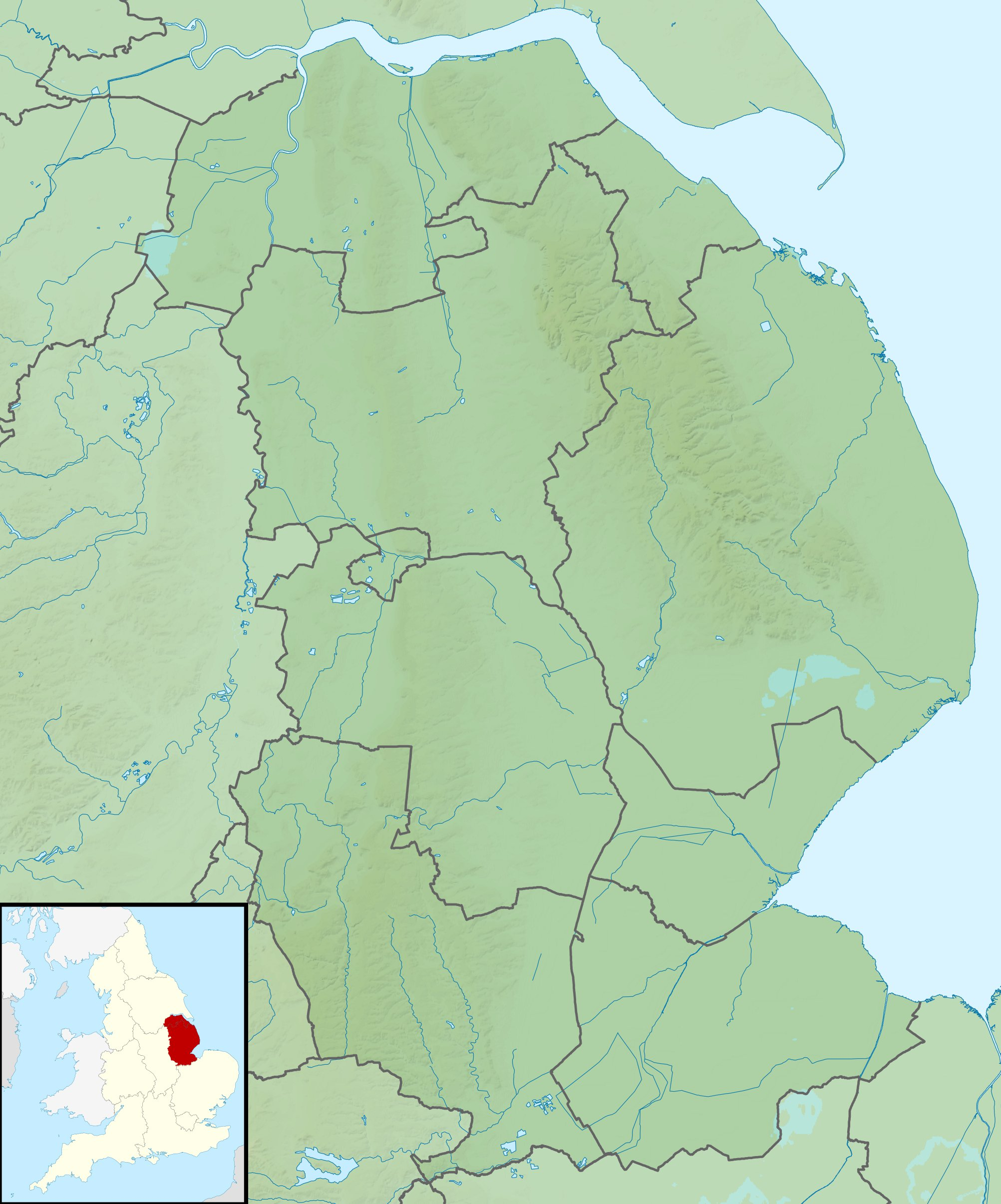
- Location within Lincolnshire
- 53.0004°N 0.4686°W
- Type: House
- Location: South Rauceby, Lincolnshire

History
- Built: 1842

Site notes
- Architect: William Burn
- Architectural style: Tudor Revival
- Governing body: Privately owned

Listed Building – Grade II
- Official name: South Rauceby Hall
- Designated: 27 September 1983
- Reference no.: 1168616

Listed Building – Grade II
- Official name: Lodge, gates and railings to South Rauceby Hall
- Designated: 27 September 1983
- Reference no.: 1360615

National Register of Historic Parks and Gardens
- Official name: Rauceby Hall park and garden
- Designated: 24 June 1985
- Reference no.: 1000987

South Rauceby Hall, South Rauceby, Lincolnshire, England is a country house dating from the mid-19th century. It was designed by William Burn in 1842 for Anthony Peacock Willson. Inherited by the Cracroft-Amcotts family, it remains a private house. It is a Grade II listed building.

== History ==
South Rauceby Hall, often simply Rauceby Hall, is built on the site of an earlier house. The present building was commissioned in 1842 by Anthony Peacock Willson, a local banker, on his acquiring the Rauceby estate in 1842. He engaged William Burn, a Scottish architect with a large country house practice. Burn had already undertaken work in Lincolnshire, at Stoke Rochford Hall, and at Harlaxton Manor, and was to continue his work in the county at Revesby Abbey. Following the death of Willson, and of his four unmarried and childless sons, the house was inherited in 1931 by a distant relative, John Cracroft-Amcotts. (Note: Anthony Peacock Willson’s sister, Louisa, was the mother of Cecil Rhodes.) In the 1940s, Neville Henderson, a relative of the Cracroft-Amcotts, and British ambassador to Berlin in the years immediately prior to the outbreak of the Second World War, lived at the house, writing his memoir, Failure of a Mission: Berlin 1937–1939, while in residence. South Rauceby Hall remains in the ownership of the Cracroft-Amcotts family and is not open to the public. The park is occasionally accessible.

== Architecture ==
Nicholas Antram, in his 2002 revised volume Lincolnshire, in the Pevsner Buildings of England series, describes the architectural style of South Rauceby as Tudor Gothic, and notes that the hall lacks the Baroque elements of Revesby Abbey and Stoke Rochford Hall. The house is of two main storeys, with basements and attics. The construction material is limestone ashlar. South Rauceby Hall is a Grade II listed building as is the entrance lodge, with its gates and railings. The gardens and park are designated Grade II on the Register of Historic Parks and Gardens of Special Historic Interest in England.

== Sources ==
- Pevsner, Nikolaus; Harris, John; Antram, Nicholas (2002). Lincolnshire. The Buildings of England. New Haven and London: Yale University Press. ISBN 0-300-09620-8.
