= Kettlethorpe Hall =

Victorian house in Kettlethorpe, Lincolnshire, England

Coordinates: 53.2706°N 0.7295°W

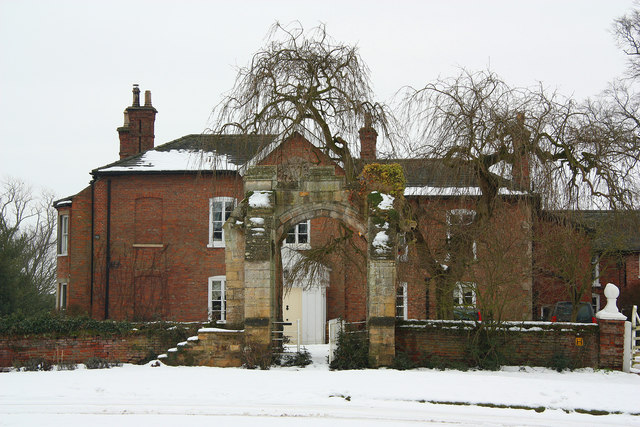
The present Kettlethorpe Hall, former seat of the Swynfords

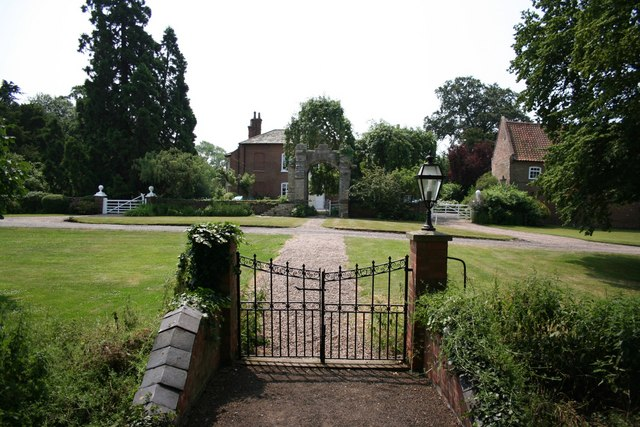
The gateway and hall seen from the church

Kettlethorpe Hall is a Victorian house in Kettlethorpe, Lincolnshire, noted for its connection to Katherine Swynford, Duchess of Lancaster. It encloses fragments of the former manor house including the medieval gatehouse, within the surviving moat. It is a Grade II listed building.

Sir Hugh Swynford (died in 1371) married Katherine Roet, whose sister Philippa is believed to have been the wife of Geoffrey Chaucer. Lady Katherine later became governess to the children of John of Gaunt, the third surviving son of Edward III, and subsequently his mistress. Their four children, the Beauforts, were eventually legitimised when Gaunt took Lady Katherine as his third wife, in 1396. She at one time lived at Kettlethorpe Hall.

The present house was built in the early 1700s for Charles Hall, MP, whose grandfather had acquired the estate by marriage. He died without issue and bequeathed Kettlethorpe to his half-brother's son, Charles Amcotts, MP of Harrington Hall. He in turn left it to his sister Anna-Maria, who had married Sir Wharton Emerson, who changed his name to Amcotts. After passing by marriage to Sir William Amcotts-Ingilby it was inherited by Weston Cracroft Amcotts, MP, who carried out extensive remodelling of the house in 1863. It then further passed down in the family to Sir Weston Cracroft-Amcotts, who sold it in 1961.

The house contains walls, some carved heads and a small oak-panelled room dating from the 17th century. In the old tower is an early 18th-century panelled dining room with a late 18th-century marble fireplace. The drawing room's stucco ceiling is 18th-century, and the library and front hall are Victorian.

The moat and its cleaning was one of the most widely used examples in the MPs' expenses claims scandal during 2009. This contributed to the retirement of its owner, the 3rd Viscount Hailsham, from the House of Commons and the granting to him of a life peerage allowing him to sit in the House of Lords.
