= Henry William Newman Fane =

English local politician

Captain Henry William Newman Fane, OBE, JP, DL (6 February 1897 – 23 May 1976) was an English local politician who served as the Chairman of Kesteven County Council and High Sheriff of Lincolnshire.

== Early life and family ==
A member of the Fane family, Henry William Newman Fane was born on 6 February 1897, the eldest son of Colonel William Vere Reeve Fane (later King-Fane) (1868–1943), JP, DL, of Fulbeck Hall in Lincolnshire, and his wife, Helen Beatrice (died 1962), daughter of Thomas Houldsworth Newman.

On 14 December 1946, Fane married Dorothy Mary (died 1986), daughter of Alexander Ogilvy Findlay, of Llantarnam in Monmouthshire; they had one daughter: Mary Helen (1947–2000), who married Michael Robin Fry, a graphic designer, and had children.

== Career ==
Following his schooling at Charterhouse and the Royal Military Academy, Woolwich, Fane joined the British Army, being commissioned into the Royal Horse and Royal Field Artillery in the Royal Regiment of Artillery as a second lieutenant on 22 April 1915. He served in World War I and was promoted to lieutenant in September 1919, before retiring in January 1923 with that rank. (Note: When he reached the age limit of liability for recall in 1947, Fane was removed from the Reserve of Officers and granted the honorary rank of captain.) In 1937, he was appointed a justice of the peace and elected onto Kesteven County Council; in 1951, he became a deputy lieutenant, and the following year was appointed High Sheriff of Lincolnshire. He was later elected as an alderman by his fellow County Councillors. He served as vice-chairman (1957–62) and chairman (1962–68) of Kesteven County Council before chairing the Lincolnshire Police Authority in 1968. Fane was also a long-term chairman of Sleaford Magistrates and a prominent member of the local Divisional Conservative Association. Described by the Lincolnshire Echo as a "leading figure in Lincolnshire public and political life for many years", he was appointed an Officer of the Order of the British Empire in 1974. He died on 23 May 1976, aged 79.

Preceded by John Cracroft-Amcotts	Vice-Chairman of Kesteven County Council; 1957 – 1962	Succeeded by ??
Preceded by Frank Jenkinson	Chairman of Kesteven County Council; 1962 – 1968	Succeeded by J. H. Lewis
