= J. H. Lewis =

English landowner, farmer and local politician

John Hedley Lewis DL (October 1908 – 28 December 1976) was an English landowner, farmer and local politician, who served as Chairman of Kesteven County Council and Lincolnshire County Council.

Born in October 1908, John Hedley Lewis lived at Birkholme Manor in Corby Glen, a village in Lincolnshire. He went to school at Stubbington House, Fareham, and Malvern College, before graduating from Sidney Sussex College, Cambridge, with a degree in mathematics. Hedley Lewis served in World War II as an RAF intelligence officer. He was elected to Kesteven County Council in a by-election in July 1954. He served on it for two decades; by 1964, he was an alderman and its vice-chairman. In 1968 he was unanimously elected chairman of Kesteven County Council and he went on to chair it for five years, before becoming the first chairman of Lincolnshire County Council from its inception as a successor to Kesteven CC in 1973, to November 1976, when he resigned on health grounds. He was appointed a deputy lieutenant of the county on 31 January 1972.

Hedley Lewis unsuccessfully contested the parliamentary seat of Kettering as a Conservative at the 1959 and 1964 general elections.

Hedley Lewis was a keen sportsman. He represented Gloucestershire at tennis. On 16 September 1949, fishing off Scarborough, he caught a massive tunny (Atlantic bluefin tuna) which weighed 852 pounds (386.5 kg). An objection from the existing British record holder, Lorenzo Mitchell-Henry, with a fish weighing 851 pounds (386.0 kg), was sustained on the grounds that the rope from which Hedley Lewis' fish was hung was wet and therefore excessively heavy.

He died on 28 December 1976, aged 68.

Preceded by Henry Fane	Vice-Chairman of Kesteven County Council; 1962 – 1968	Succeeded by ??
Preceded by Henry Fane	Chairman of Kesteven County Council; 1968 – 1974	Succeeded by Post abolished
Preceded by Post established	Chairman of Lincolnshire County Council; 1973 – 1976	Succeeded by Clifford Hall
