= Royal Commission on the Supply of Food and Raw Materials in Time of War =

The Royal Commission on the Supply of Food and Raw Materials in Time of War was established in April 1903 by Arthur Balfour's Unionist government and submitted its final report in 1905. Its report noted Britain's strategic weakness in her heavy reliance on imports for food and raw materials. Britain would experience starvation and mass unemployment within a few weeks of war if the Royal Navy could not keep the seas open.

Wheat and flour were "by far the most important articles of consumption in these islands", but the commission did not recommend any protectionism, arguing that the volume of British shipping, the network of British coaling stations and the multiple shipping routes means that blockading was impossible. German planning was the reverse.
