= William Vere Reeve King-Fane =

English local politician, magistrate and landowner

Colonel William Vere Reeve King-Fane OBE JP DL (born Fane; 29 October 1868 – 5 November 1943) was an English local politician, magistrate and landowner, who served as vice-chairman of Kesteven County Council and High Sheriff of Lincolnshire.

== Family ==
A member of the Fane family, William Vere Reeve Fane was born on 29 October 1868 at 7 Norfolk Crescent, London, the eldest son of William Dashwood Fane, JP (1816–1902), of Fulbeck Hall in Lincolnshire, and his wife Sarah Millicent (1823–1877), elder daughter of General John Reeve, of Leadenham House, Lincolnshire.

Educated at St John's College, Cambridge, William Dashwood Fane was a barrister, and served as Secretary to the Mercantile Law Commission (1853–56), and Legal Assistant (1856–67) and Assistant Secretary (1865–67) to the Board of Trade. His own father, William (1789–1839), was a civil servant in Bengal and the younger son of Hon. Henry Fane, himself the younger son of the 8th Earl of Westmorland; Henry had inherited an estate centred on the Lincolnshire village of Fulbeck. After resigning his position at the Board of Trade, William Dashwood Fane went to live at Norwood House, Southwell, and then Melbourne Hall, Derby (neither of which he owned), before purchasing his family's old home, Fulbeck Hall, in 1887; he moved into the house in 1894.

On 16 May 1895, Fane married Helen Beatrice (died 1962), second daughter of Thomas Holdsworth Newman (and granddaughter of Martin Tucker Smith by his daughter Elizabeth Laura), and had issue:

- Captain Henry William Newman Fane, OBE, JP, DL (1897–1976), who served as High Sheriff of Lincolnshire in 1952, and vice-chairman (1957–62) and then chairman (1962–67) of Kesteven County Council.
- Lieutenant Francis Christopher Fane, RN (ret.) (1900–1947), who married Joyce Patricia, daughter of Rev. William Hugh Munely Hancock, vicar of Leadenham, leaving issue, including Julian Francis Fane, DL (born 1938), who served as High Sheriff of Lincolnshire in 1981.
- Charles William Fane (1904–1976), who married firstly Pauline Margaret, daughter of Rev. Ernest Morell Blackie, Dean of Rochester, and had issue, including Peter William Fane (born 1939), High Sheriff of Lincolnshire, 1983–84; he married secondly Pamela Mary, daughter of Robert Millington Synge, and had issue.
- Elizabeth Christine Fane (1906–1997), who married Colonel Jeffrey Maurice Lambert, son of Colonel Joseph Alexander Lambert, and had issue.

In 1920 he changed his surname by Royal Licence to King-Fane on inheriting the Ashby Hall estate in Ashby de la Launde.

== Life ==
Following schooling at Eton College, Fane matriculated at Trinity College, Cambridge, in 1886, before graduating with a Bachelor of Arts degree in 1889 and proceeding to a Master of Arts degree in 1894. He was called to the bar at the Inner Temple in 1892 and practised as a barrister on the Midland Circuit, but only for a short time. He was commissioned a captain in the 3rd (Militia) Battalion of the Lincolnshire Regiment on 11 November 1897, and saw active service with this unit in the Second Boer War in South Africa. Following the end of this war, Fane returned with the battalion aboard Cestrian, which reached Southampton on 5 October 1902. During World War I, Fane was lieutenant-colonel of the 3rd training battalion stationed in Grimsby, before retiring in 1918 with the rank of Brevet Colonel.

Fane took an active interest in local government, which intensified after his retirement from the armed forces. He was appointed High Sheriff of Lincolnshire in 1907 on the death of Edgar Lubbock, and was appointed a Deputy Lieutenant of the county in 1911. In 1915, he was elected an Alderman of Kesteven County Council. In 1934, he was elected vice-chairman, succeeding Robert Pattinson, and served in that post until 1937, when he resigned and J. H. Bowman took over. A staunch Conservative, King-Fane was chairman of the Grantham Divisional Conservative Association. He was also chairman of the Diocesan Finance Committee in 1930 and a member of the Lincolnshire Diocesan Trust and Board of Finance. As a member of the County Council, he took a keen interest in education and chaired the Education Committee, as well as the board of governors of Kesteven and Grantham Girls' School from November 1940.

King-Fane resigned from the post of vice-chairman of Kesteven County Council in 1937 owing to ill health, and stepped down from the Council in 1941. Although Fulbeck Hall had been his home for many years, King-Fane and his wife lived at the George Hotel in Grantham after the beginning of World War II. He died at the town's hospital on 5 November 1943.

| Preceded by Sir Robert Pattinson | Vice-Chairman of Kesteven County Council; 1934 – 1937 | Succeeded by J. H. Bowman |
