= Mid Lincolnshire =

Parliamentary constituency in the United Kingdom, 1868–1885

- Former county constituency for the House of Commons

1868–1885
- Seats: two
- Created from: North Lincolnshire; South Lincolnshire
- Replaced by: Horncastle; Sleaford; Gainsborough; Louth

Mid Lincolnshire, formally called the Mid Division of Lincolnshire, was a county constituency in Lincolnshire. It returned two Members of Parliament (MPs) to the House of Commons of the Parliament of the United Kingdom, elected by the bloc vote electoral system.

== History ==
The constituency was created by the Reform Act 1867 for the 1868 general election. It was abolished by the Redistribution of Seats Act 1885 for the 1885 general election.

== Boundaries ==
1868–1885: In the Parts of Lindsey, the Wapentakes, Hundreds, or Sokes of Well, Lawress, Wraggoe, Gartree, Candleshoe, Calceworth (except so much as lies within the Hundred of Louth Eske), Hill, Bolingbroke, Horncastle, and in the Parts of Kesteven, the Wapentakes, Hundreds, or Sokes of Boothby Graffoe, and Langoe, and Lincoln Liberty.

== Members of Parliament ==
Election	First member	First party	Second member	Second party
1868	Weston Cracroft Amcotts	Liberal	Henry Chaplin	Conservative
1874	Edward Stanhope	Conservative	Henry Chaplin	Conservative
1885	Redistribution of Seats Act: constituency abolished			

== Election results ==
General election 1868: Mid Lincolnshire
Party	Candidate	Votes	%	±%
Liberal	Weston Cracroft Amcotts	Unopposed		
Conservative	Henry Chaplin	Unopposed		
Registered electors		8,694		
Liberal win (new seat)				
Conservative win (new seat)				

General election 1874: Mid Lincolnshire
Party	Candidate	Votes	%	±%
Conservative	Henry Chaplin	Unopposed		
Conservative	Edward Stanhope	Unopposed		
Registered electors		8,549		
Conservative hold				
Conservative gain from Liberal				

General election 1880: Mid Lincolnshire
Party	Candidate	Votes	%	±%
Conservative	Henry Chaplin	Unopposed		
Conservative	Edward Stanhope	Unopposed		
Registered electors		8,822		
Conservative hold				
Conservative hold				

Chaplin was appointed Chancellor of the Duchy of Lancaster and Stanhope was appointed Vice-President of the Committee of the Council on Education, requiring two by-elections.

By-election, 1 July 1885: Mid Lincolnshire
Party	Candidate	Votes	%	±%
Conservative	Henry Chaplin	Unopposed		
Conservative	Edward Stanhope	Unopposed		
Conservative hold				
Conservative hold				
