= Rodolph Adlercron =

British Army officer (1873–1966)

Brigadier-General Rodolph Adlercron CMG DSO* JP DL
- Adlercron in 1917
- Born: 5 July 1873
- Died: 12 June 1966 (aged 92)
- Military career
- Allegiance: United Kingdom
- Branch: British Army
- Service years: 1892–1920
- Rank: Brigadier-General
- Units: Royal Irish Rifles; The Queen's Own Cameron Highlanders
- Commands: 124th Infantry Brigade; 148th Infantry Brigade; 6th Battalion, West Riding Regiment
- Conflicts: Mahdist War; Second Boer War; First World War
- Awards: Companion of the Order of St Michael and St George; Companion of the Distinguished Service Order & Bar; Mentioned in Despatches

Brigadier-General Rodolph Ladeveze Adlercron, CMG, DSO & Bar, JP, DL (5 July 1873 – 12 June 1966) was a British Army officer and local politician.

== Early life and family ==
Rodolph Ladeveze Adlercron was born on 5 July 1873, the second son of George Rothe Ladeveze Adlercron (died 1884), of Moyglare, County Meath, and his wife Aloÿse Blanche Lilias, second daughter of Baron Godefroi de Blonay, of Vernand, Lausanne. In 1910, Adlercron married Hester (died 1939), younger daughter of John Chandler Bancroft (died 1901), of Boston in the United States, and had four daughters: Lillias Nina Aloyse (born 1911), Meliora Lavinia (born 1912), Hester Elizabeth (born 1913) and Pauline Aymee Margaret (born 1915). Meliora died in 1930 from injuries sustained in a motoring accident; in 1936, the youngest daughter, Pauline, married John Christopher Morrell Blackie, son of Ernest Blackie, Bishop of Grimsby.

== Military career ==
After schooling at Eton, Adlercron was commissioned a second lieutenant in the 5th Battalion of the Royal Irish Rifles on 12 February 1892. Following a promotion to lieutenant in 1893, he was transferred at that rank to The Queen's Own Cameron Highlanders on 2 June 1894 after Lieutenant F. A. MacFarlan was appointed adjutant. He took part in the Nile Expedition and Second Boer War, being mentioned in despatches in both conflicts. Promotion to Captain followed in 1899, before Adlercron was seconded to be an adjutant in the 4th Battalion of the Lincolnshire Regiment, part of the Territorial Force. He was appointed a Brigade Major that October, before promotion to major two years later.

Adlercron served on the Western Front during the First World War. He was made a Brigade Major in The Queen's Own Cameron Highlanders in August 1914, and the following October was promoted to temporary lieutenant colonel, commanding a Territorial Force (TF) unit, the 6th West Riding Regiment. He subsequently commanded the 148th and 124th Infantry Brigades. He was promoted to temporary brigadier general in June 1916 and was promoted that December to brevet lieutenant colonel. By the time the war was over, he had been mentioned in despatches seven times, and been appointed a Companion of the Distinguished Service Order with Bar, and a Companion of the Order of St Michael and St George.

He was placed on the retired list in March 1920 and granted the honorary rank of brigadier general. He was Honorary Colonel of the 6th Battalion of the Duke of Wellington's Regiment.

== Later life ==
Adlercron was a Justice of the peace and Deputy Lieutenant for Lincolnshire. In 1946, he was elected onto Kesteven County Council for the Welby division; he was returned again in 1949, and 1952. He died on 12 June 1966.

== Heraldry ==
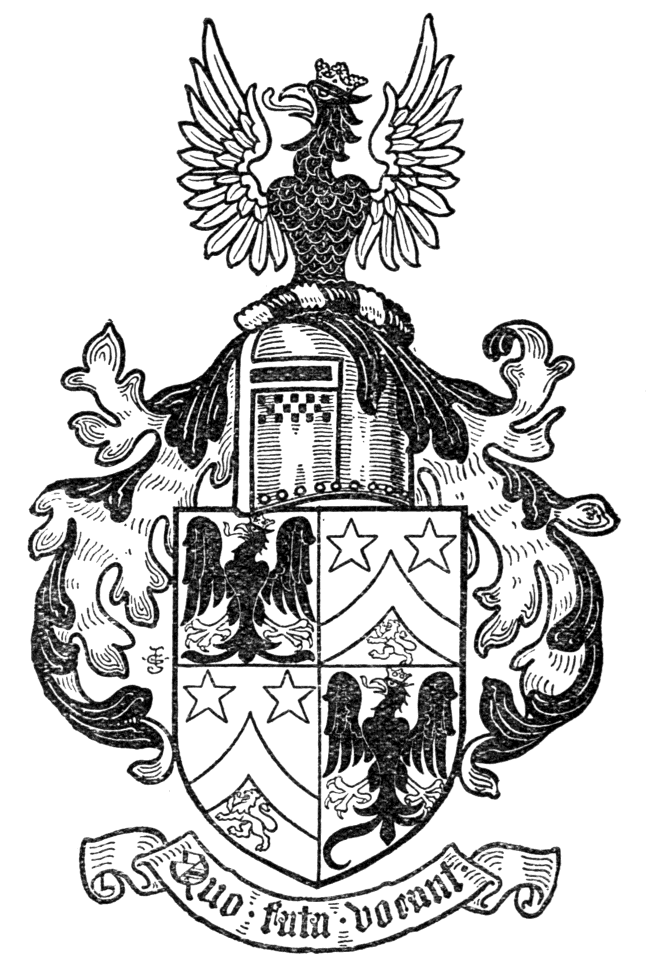
Arms of Rodolph Ladeveze Adlercron

Adlercron bore the following coat of arms: Quarterly 1 and 4 Argent and eagle displayed wings inverted Sable langued Gules membered and ducally crowned Or; 2 and 3 Argent a chevron in point embowed between in chief two mullets and in base a lion rampant all Gules. Quarters 1 and 4 represented the family of Adlercron, while the other two were for Trapaud.
