= Harold Hood =

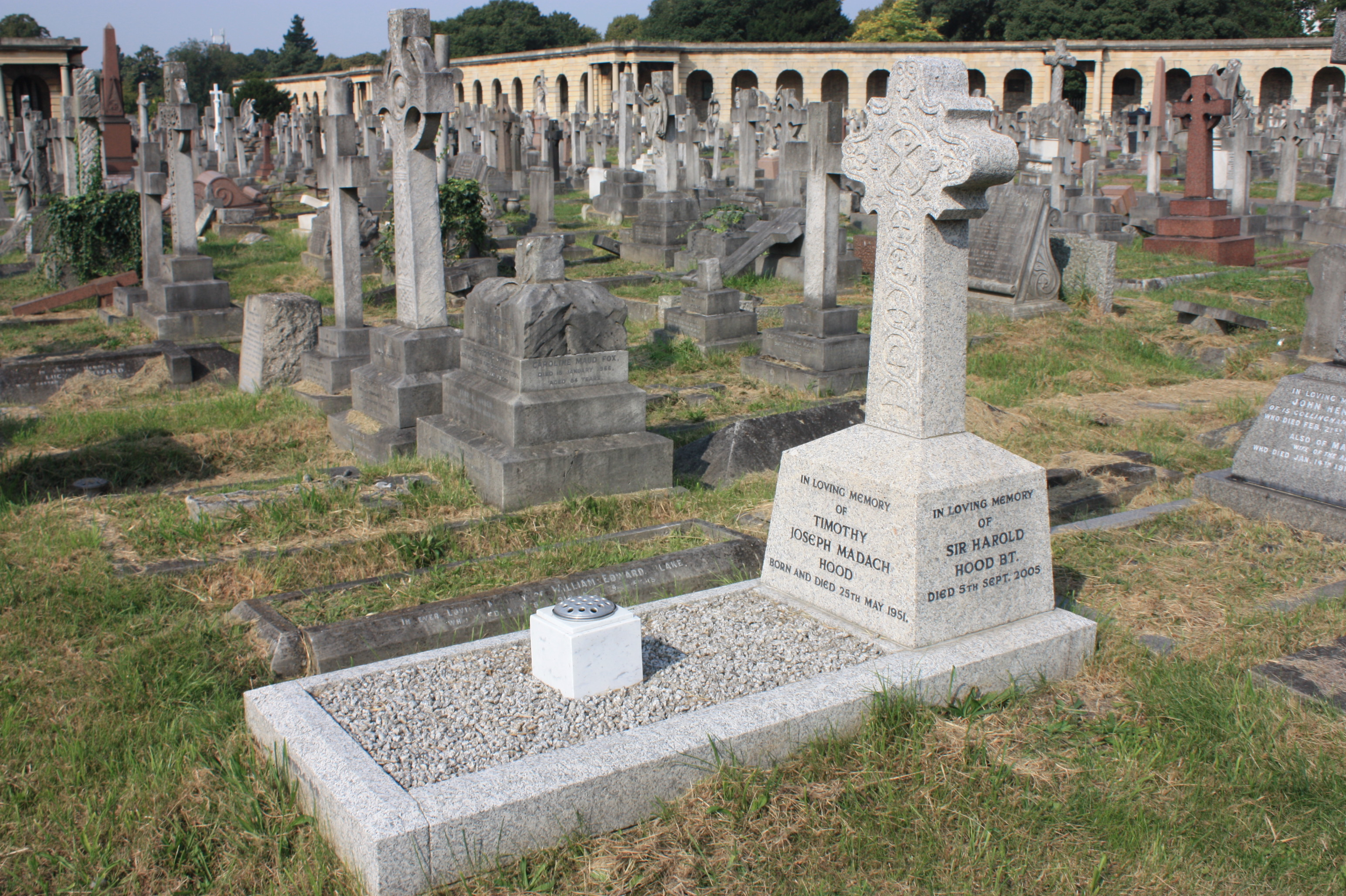
Sir Harold Hood's grave, Brompton Cemetery, London

Sir Harold Hood, 2nd Baronet (23 January 1916 – 5 September 2005) was the son of Sir Joseph Hood. Just before his fifteenth birthday in 1931, he succeeded to the baronetcy on his father's death. He married Ferelith Rosemary Florence Kenworthy, daughter of Joseph Kenworthy, 10th Baron Strabolgi. Hood was a devout Catholic and worked in Catholic publishing for much of his life, including working on the Catholic Herald and The Universe. He was involved with many charities including the Bourne Trust and the Prison Advice and Care Trust. Hood was a Knight of Malta and a Knight Grand Cross of the Order of St. Gregory the Great.

He died aged 89 and the heir to the baronetcy was his son John Hood.

He is buried in the central roundel of Brompton Cemetery in London towards the south-west.

== See also ==
- Hood Baronets

Baronetage of the United Kingdom
| Preceded by Sir Joseph Hood | Baronet (of Wimbledon); 1931–2005 | Succeeded by Sir John Hood |
