= Hood baronets of Wimbledon (1922) =

Escutcheon of the Hood baronets of Wimbledon

The Hood baronetcy, of Wimbledon in the County of Surrey, was created in the Baronetage of the United Kingdom on 16 January 1922 for Joseph Hood. He represented Wimbledon in the House of Commons as a Conservative from 1918 to 1924. As of 2026, the presumed third holder of the title has not proved his succession and is therefore not on the Official Roll of the Baronetage, with the baronetcy considered dormant.

== Hood baronets, of Wimbledon (1922) ==
- Sir Joseph Hood, 1st Baronet (1863–1931)
- Sir Harold Joseph Hood, 2nd Baronet (1916–2005)
- Sir John Joseph Harold Hood, 3rd Baronet (born 1952). His name does not appear on the Official Roll of the Baronetage.

The heir presumptive is the present holder's brother, Basil Gervase Francis Gerard Hood (born 1955).
