= Sir Joseph Hood, 1st Baronet =

British politician

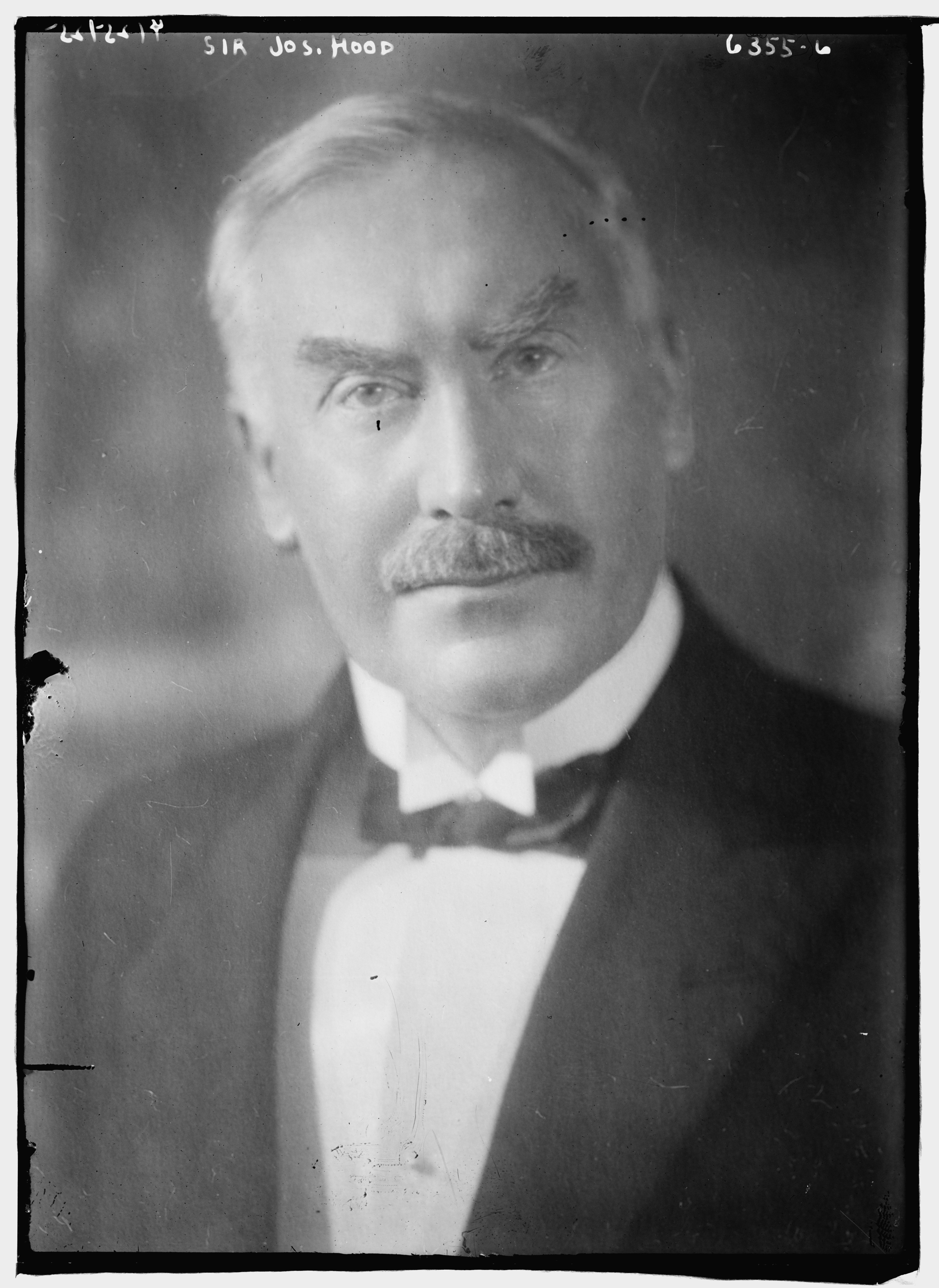
Sir Joseph Hood in 1925

Sir Joseph Hood, 1st Baronet (31 March 1863 – 10 January 1931) was a British businessman and Conservative Party politician.

== Biography ==
Born in Ashby de la Zouch (Ashby), Leicestershire, Hood was educated at the local grammar school. He subsequently studied law, and was admitted as a solicitor in 1890, practising in Liverpool.

In 1902 he was employed as solicitor to act for Imperial Tobacco Company and American Tobacco Company in their formation of the joint venture British-American Tobacco Company Ltd. He was appointed a director of the three companies, and was one of the deputy-chairman of British American Tobacco. He resigned from these positions in 1921. In 1900 he married Katherine Kenny of County Wexford, and the couple had three daughters. She died in 1913. His second marriage was to Marie Robinson of Dublin, with whom he had two sons.

During World War I he served on two committees of the Board of Trade and acted as an assistant controller at the Ministry of Information.

At the 1918 general election he was elected as Coalition Conservative Member of Parliament for Wimbledon. He held the seat at the next two general elections, and in 1922 was created a baronet "of Wimbledon in the County of Surrey". He retired from the Commons at the 1924 general election.

Hood was known as a generous benefactor to the area he represented in parliament. He donated a recreation ground at Raynes Park to Merton and Morden Urban District Council and playing fields and woodland in South Wimbledon to the Borough of Wimbledon. Following his death they were named Sir Joseph Hood Memorial Playing Fields, and Sir Joseph Hood Memorial Wood. Hood lived at Winkfield Lodge on Wimbledon's Parkside during the 1920s. The house presently serves as the home of the Apostolic Nunciature to Great Britain. Sir Joseph was a member of the committee that built and opened London's first public golf courses in Richmond Park, which were opened in 1923 and 1925.

Sir Joseph and Lady Hood were granted the freedom of the borough of Wimbledon in 1924. In 1930 he was elected mayor of Wimbledon by the borough council, an office he held until his death at his Wimbledon home after a short illness in January 1931. He was succeeded in the baronetcy by his eldest son Harold Hood, then aged 14.

== See also ==
- Hood Baronets

Parliament of the United Kingdom
Preceded by Sir Stuart Coats, Bt	Member of Parliament for Wimbledon; 1918–1924	Succeeded by Sir John Power
Baronetage of the United Kingdom
New creation	Baronet (of Wimbledon); 1922–1931	Succeeded by Harold Hood
