= Shas Sheehan, Baroness Sheehan =

British politician and life peer

The Right Honourable The Baroness Sheehan
- شائستہ احمد شیہان
- Official portrait, 2026

Member of the House of Lords
- Lord Temporal
- Life peerage 2 October 2015

Personal details
- Born: 29 July 1959 (age 67) Lahore, Pakistan
- Party: Liberal Democrats
- Education: Imperial College London

Shaista Ahmad Sheehan, Baroness Sheehan (Punjabi: شائستہ احمد شیہان; born 29 July 1959) is a British politician and life peer. She was nominated for a life peerage by Nick Clegg in August 2015.

== Early life and education ==
Shaista Ahmad was born on 29 July 1959 to a Punjabi Muslim family in Lahore, Pakistan. She migrated with her family to the United Kingdom during her childhood and completed a master's degree in Environmental Technology at Imperial College London, through the Imperial College Centre for Environmental Technology (ICCET), now the Centre for Environmental Policy, graduating with distinction in 1989.

== Public service ==
Sheehan served as councillor for Kew from 2006 to 2010. She has also stood for Wimbledon at the 2010 and 2015 general election, finishing second and third, as well as the 2012 London Assembly election. She lives in Putney.

She was created a life peer taking the title Baroness Sheehan, of Wimbledon in the London Borough of Merton and of Tooting in the London Borough of Wandsworth on 2 October 2015. Her peerage created considerable surprise given her inexperience and lack of notable achievement in public life, with The Spectator magazine asking "Is Shas Sheehan the "least deserving person to ever be made a Lib Dem peer?"

Between 2015 and 2019 she was a member of the House of Lords Select Committee on Energy and the Environment and since July 2019 she has served as a member of the Science and Technology Committee (House of Lords). She became chair of the Environment and Climate Change Committee on 31 January 2024. The committee conducts inquiries and reports on environmental and climate policy issues.
