= The Woolwich =

Former building society

Woolwich PLC
- Type: Public
- Industry: Financial services
- Founded: 1847; 179 years ago
- Fate: Merged with parent
- Headquarters: London, United Kingdom
- Products: Mortgages
- Parent: Barclays
- Website: Barclays Group Archives: The Woolwich

The Woolwich Equitable Building Society (later Woolwich Building Society or The Woolwich) was a British financial services company founded in Woolwich in 1847 and remained a local institution until after the First World War when it began a modest regional expansion. This accelerated after the Second World War and the period from 1960 was notable for its acquisitions. Following deregulation, the Society diversified and became one of the largest national building societies.

In 1997 it demutualised and became Woolwich PLC. The company was listed on the London Stock Exchange. It was once a constituent of the FTSE 100 Index but was acquired by Barclays in 2000.

== History ==
=== Early history ===
The origins of the Woolwich lay in an earlier terminating society, based in the local Castle Inn and chaired by the publican. In 1847 a breakaway group met to form the Woolwich Equitable Benefit Building and Investment Society (later reduced to the Woolwich Equitable Building Society). That the active founders of the new society included the pastor of the Salem Chapel and a Sunday School teacher may indicate the reason for the breakaway. The first meeting was held in the parlour of a “modest house” of Benjamin Wates, a local draper. The Wates family was to play a significant role in the early history of the Woolwich. Samuel Wates, Benjamin’s younger brother, was appointed Secretary in 1848 but following his death in 1851, Benjamin took over until 1862 followed briefly by his son and then by the youngest brother Joseph, who was Secretary and General Manager until 1880. Joseph Wates then became a director, rearing as Chairman in 1901.

A feature of the early years was the Society lending out more than it had money, with funds coming from directors signing promissory notes to the bank. Indeed, support from its bank (the London & County) was to feature on future occasions. Nevertheless, after ten years the Woolwich claimed to be “one of the leading Metropolitan societies” and dominant in its own neighbourhood. This may have been an optimistic claim as the Wolwich was run on a very small scale: the Secretary was obliged to live on the premises until 1876, and in 1863 there were only 500 members. A shock to the town and the Society was the closure of the Woolwich Dockyard in 1869. However, it made the Society look outside its immediate area. In 1872 there was reference to “suitable persons to be appointed as agents in eligible localities” and then to “outlying districts” having proved successful; however, “outlying” still appeared to be relatively local.

Further shocks were to come before the century was out. In 1886, the Woolwich's solicitor, also the son of the chairman, disappeared, prompting a run on deposits. The London and County sent funds to support the Society. This was followed by the failure of Jabez Balfour's Liberator Building Society in 1892 which caused a crisis of confidence in the whole building society movement and the withdrawal of deposits. Again, the London and County Bank sent funds to bolster reserves. Despite the earlier references to appointing agents in outlying areas, the Society remained small. In 1887, forty years after its formation, the Society’s assets were only £555,000 and it was run by one Secretary and seven clerks. Even by the 60th anniversary in 1907, the assets were little more than £1m.

=== Regional expansion begins ===
Slowly, the Woolwich was beginning to think of expansion. In 1911, it opened accounts with other banks in anticipation of widening the source of deposits. Although interrupted by the First World War in 1917 it decided to appoint special agents in provinces. The first of these was in nearby Chatham, Kent but it was not until the early 1920s that the Woolwich began a programme of branch expansion, slowly at first but then accelerating. A city office was opened in 1923, followed by Croydon in 1924, Ilford in 1925 and Romford in 1927. In 1928, three were opened including Southampton and six in 1929, with branches now in bigger cities, e.g. Bristol, Manchester and Belfast. A further 17 branches were opened in the 1930s, Dundee, Cardiff, and Liverpool indicating the geographical spread. Assets grew from £1.7m in 1919 to around £36m at the onset of the Second World War.

Branch expansion resumed immediately after the War and a regional organization was established in 1946. Three small societies had also been absorbed during the War: the Gosport and Alverstoke; Guildford and District Equitable, and Andover Mutual. However, the corporate history finishes in 1947, at the end of the Woolwich’s centenary, and detail is limited thereafter. Organic growth took assets up to £100m by the mid-1950s.

=== The modern era: expansion and diversification ===
From 1960, the Woolwich combined opening new branches with a series of acquisitions. Between the acquisition of the Modern Permanent in 1960 and the Town and Country in 1992, some nine societies were absorbed by the Woolwich. Notable among them were the fraudulent Grays and the Gateway, successor to the Temperance Building Society. The Gateway acquisition in 1988 took assets up to £13 billion. By then, financial deregulation encouraged the Woolwich to diversify away from its traditional mortgage business. In 1989, the Woolwich launched its first subsidiary operation, a financial planning service. It also formed Woolwich Property Services and took over part of the estate agency operations of the Prudential Plc in 1991; by the late 1990s, it had a national chain of nearly 170 branch locations. Other ventures included offshore banking, Woolwich Guernsey; Woolwich Life; Woolwich Unit Trust Managers Limited; and Italian and French banking businesses.

=== Demutualisation and takeover ===
The Woolwich Equitable Building Society demutualised in 1997, giving up its mutual status to become a bank: Woolwich PLC was formed, giving the company's shares to investing and borrowing members of the society, and listing on the London Stock Exchange.

In August 2000, Barclays took over Woolwich PLC in a £5.4bn acquisition. Woolwich PLC thus joined the Barclays Bank Group of companies. The Woolwich brand-name was retained after the acquisition, and the Woolwich head office remained in Bexleyheath, south-east London, 4.5 mi from the original office in Woolwich.

On 28 June 2006, Barclays announced that The Woolwich was to become the Barclays UK mortgage brand, supported by Barclays branches, and that Woolwich branches would be either closed or re-branded as Barclays.

Associated changes to call centres affected up to 1,200 jobs, mostly at The Woolwich contact centre in Clacton-on-Sea, which closed at the end of 2007.

Although the Woolwich name lived on as the brand used for Barclays mortgages, this was discontinued in 2015.

== Headquarters ==
The Woolwich Equitable Building Society started in Powis Street, Woolwich, where it occupied various premises. From 1896 until 1935, it was headquartered at a purpose-built corner office at 111-113 Powis Street, after which it moved to larger premises at Eakes Place, now Equitable House at General Gordon Square. In 1989, it moved to new headquarters in nearby Bexleyheath, alongside the society's main administration and computer centre which had been based at the corner of Watling Street and Erith Road for many years. Following the takeover by Barclays, the Bexleyheath head office closed in 2005. In 2014, the Woolwich's former head office became the Civic Offices of Bexley London Borough Council.

Equitable House continued as a branch office until 2007. In 2010–11, it was converted into a commercial building by Sundridge Investments, with a pub, a cafe and shops on the ground floor, and the upper floors rented out to Maritime Greenwich College, later South London College.

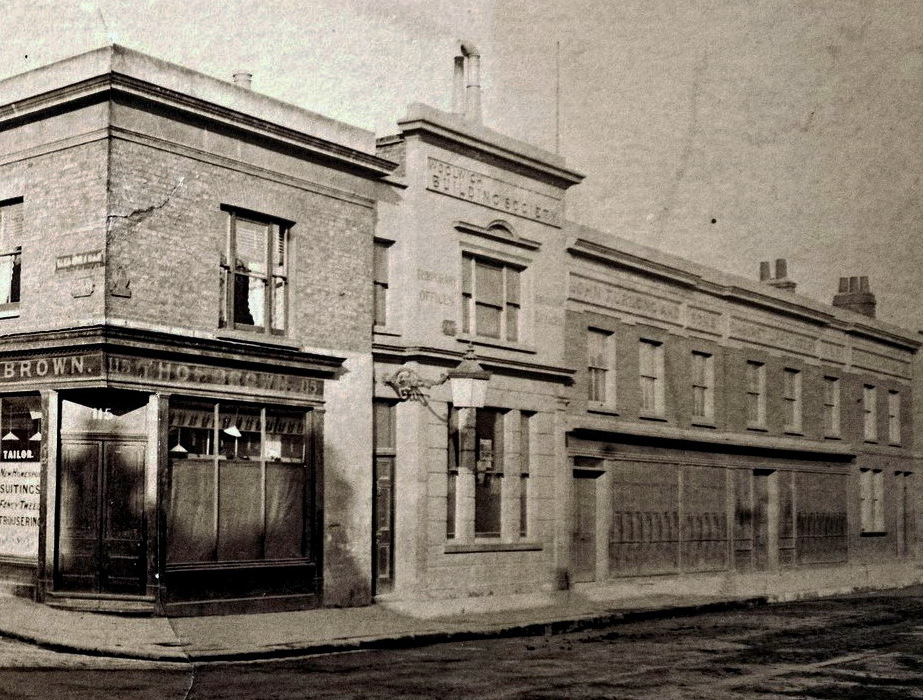
Powis Street HQ, 1847-1896

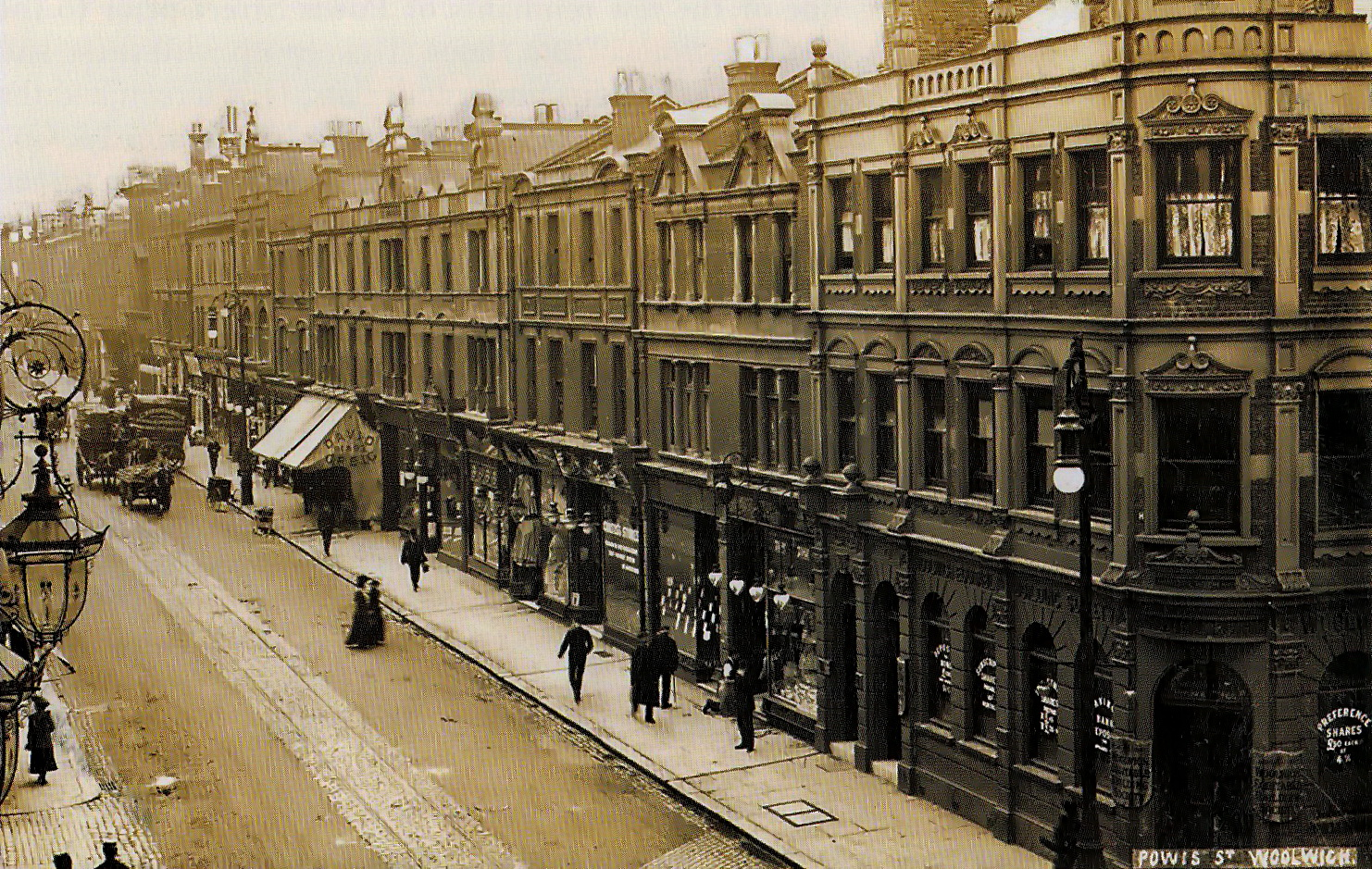
Powis Street HQ, 1896-1935 (the corner building)

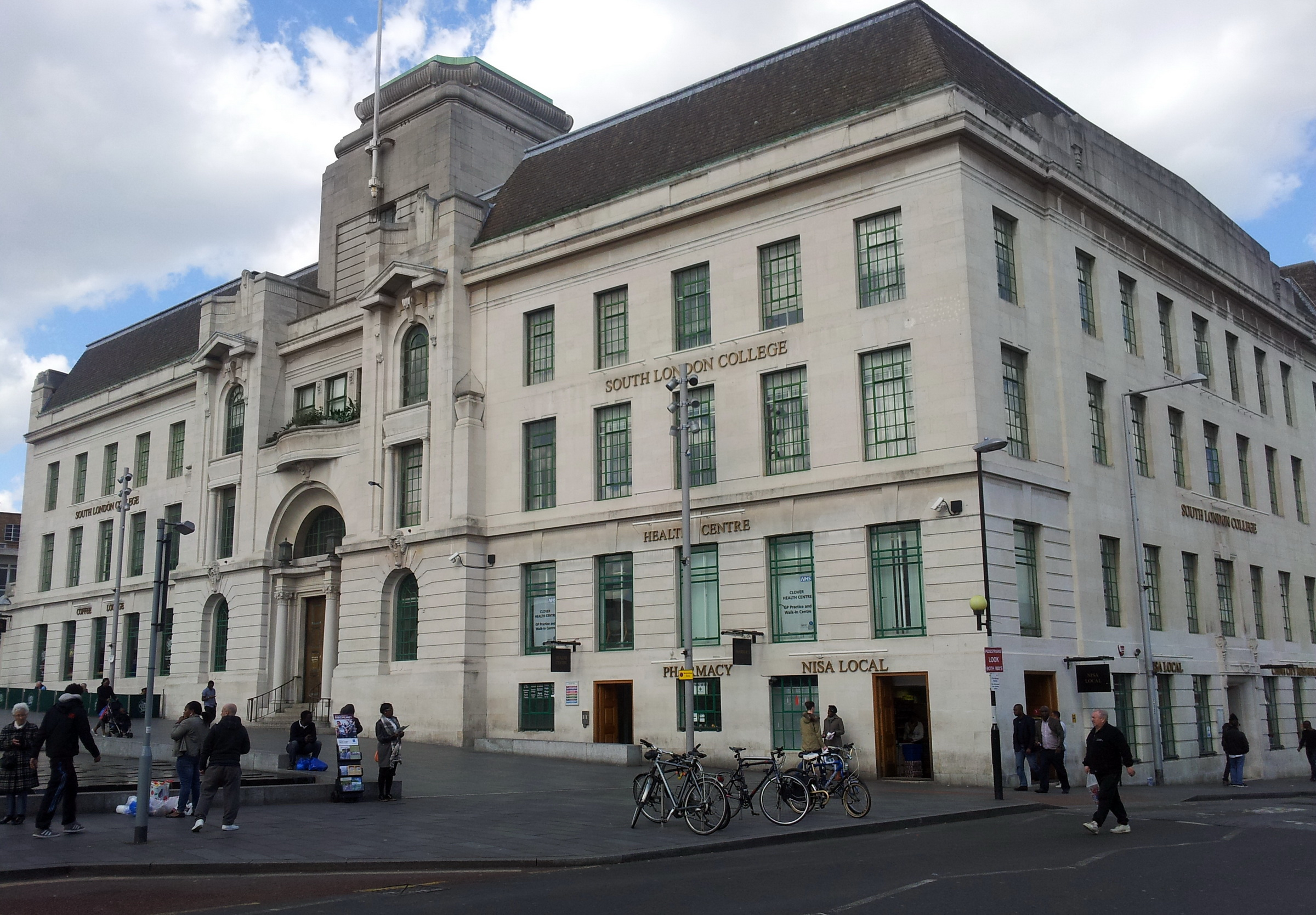
Equitable House HQ, 1935-1989

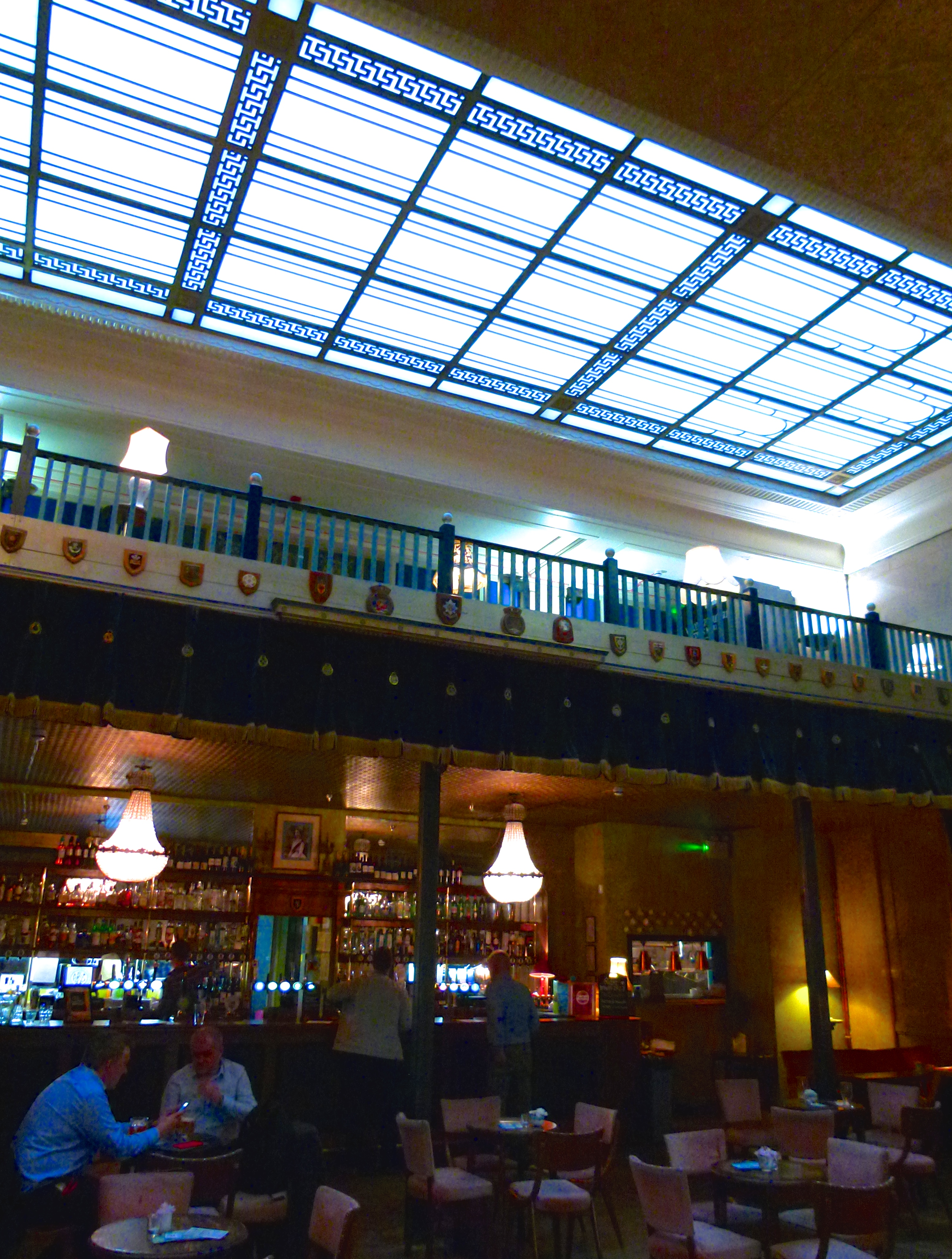
Banking hall Equitable House, now a pub

== See also ==
- Wates Group
