= Michael Havers, Baron Havers =

British barrister, politician and Lord Chancellor (1923–1992)

The Right Honourable The Lord Havers PC

Lord Chancellor
- In office 13 June 1987 – 26 October 1987
- Monarch: Elizabeth II
- Prime Minister: Margaret Thatcher
- Preceded by: The Lord Hailsham of St Marylebone
- Succeeded by: The Lord Mackay of Clashfern

Attorney General for England and Wales Attorney General for Northern Ireland
- In office 6 May 1979 – 13 June 1987
- Prime Minister: Margaret Thatcher
- Preceded by: Samuel Silkin
- Succeeded by: Patrick Mayhew

Shadow Attorney General for England and Wales
- In office 20 March 1974 – 4 May 1979
- Leader: Edward Heath; Margaret Thatcher
- Preceded by: Peter Rawlinson
- Succeeded by: Samuel Silkin

Shadow Solicitor General
- In office 4 March 1974 – 20 March 1974
- Leader: Edward Heath
- Preceded by: Samuel Silkin

Solicitor General for England and Wales
- In office 5 November 1972 – 4 March 1974
- Prime Minister: Edward Heath
- Preceded by: Geoffrey Howe
- Succeeded by: Peter Archer

Member of the House of Lords Lord Temporal
- In office 22 June 1987 – 1 April 1992; Life Peerage

Member of Parliament for Wimbledon
- In office 18 June 1970 – 18 May 1987
- Preceded by: Cyril Black
- Succeeded by: Charles Goodson-Wickes

Personal details
- Born: Robert Michael Oldfield Havers; 10 March 1923 North Sheen, Surrey, England
- Died: 1 April 1992 (aged 69) London, England
- Party: Conservative
- Spouse: Carol Elizabeth Lay (m. 1949)
- Children: Philip Havers; Nigel Havers
- Parent: Cecil Havers (father)
- Relatives: Elizabeth Butler-Sloss, Baroness Butler-Sloss (sister)
- Education: Corpus Christi College, Cambridge

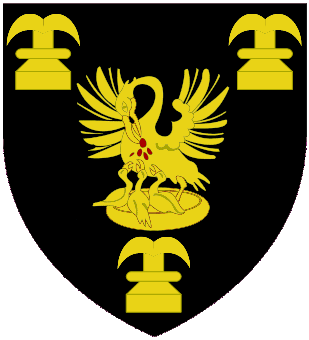
Shield of arms, displayed in the House of Lords (Also see the arms borne by his sister, Baroness Butler-Sloss.)

Robert Michael Oldfield Havers, Baron Havers, PC (10 March 1923 – 1 April 1992), was a British barrister and Conservative politician. He was knighted in 1972 and appointed a life peer in 1987.

== Early life and military service ==
Havers was born in North Sheen in 1923, the second son of High Court judge Sir Cecil Havers and Enid Flo Havers, née Snelling. He was the brother of Baroness Butler-Sloss (born 1933) who in 1988 became the first woman named to the Court of Appeal and later President of the Family Division.

He was educated at Westminster School, before joining the Royal Navy in 1941 during the Second World War. He served as a 19-year-old midshipman on HMS Sirius attached to Force Q in the Mediterranean. On 10 September 1943, he was promoted from temporary acting sub-lieutenant to temporary sub-lieutenant. Following the end of the war, he transferred to the permanent Royal Navy Volunteer Reserve during April 1947 in the rank of lieutenant seniority from 1 August 1945.

After demobilisation, he matriculated at Corpus Christi College, Cambridge, in 1946, where he read law.

== Legal career ==
Havers was called to the bar in 1948 and undertook his pupillage in the chambers of Fred Lawton, as the pupil of Gerald Howard. Havers was made a Queen's Counsel in 1964. He was the Recorder of Dover from 1962 to 1968 and Recorder of Norwich from 1968 to 1971. In 1967, Havers represented Mick Jagger and Keith Richards for their trial for drug-related charges. He was elected a bencher of the Inner Temple in 1971.

== Political career ==
Havers was elected to the House of Commons representing Wimbledon in 1970, a seat he held until 1987. He served as Solicitor General under Edward Heath from 1972 to 1974. He became a member of the Privy Council in 1977. He served as Attorney General for England and Wales and Northern Ireland from 1979 to 1987 under Margaret Thatcher; his was the longest unbroken tenure of the office since the eighteenth century. During the Falklands War, Havers was included in Thatcher's War Cabinet, to which he provided advice on international law and rules of engagement.

In June 1987 he was appointed Lord Chancellor and consequently became a life peer as Baron Havers, of St Edmundsbury in the County of Suffolk, the last to be ennobled upon appointment. However, he was forced to resign that October, due to ill health.

== Controversy ==
=== Yorkshire Ripper trial ===
In May 1981, at the beginning of the trial of Peter Sutcliffe, the Yorkshire Ripper, Sutcliffe pleaded not guilty to 13 counts of murder, but guilty to manslaughter on the grounds of diminished responsibility. The basis of this defence was his claim that he was the tool of God's will. Sutcliffe first claimed to have heard voices while working as a gravedigger, that ultimately ordered him to kill prostitutes. He said the voices originated from a headstone of a deceased Polish man, Bronislaw Zapolski, and that the voice was that of God.

He also pleaded guilty to seven counts of attempted murder. The prosecution intended to accept Sutcliffe's plea after four psychiatrists diagnosed him with paranoid schizophrenia. However, the trial judge, Mr Justice Boreham, demanded an unusually detailed explanation of the prosecution reasoning. After a two-hour submission by Havers, the Attorney-General, a 90-minute lunch break and a further 40 minutes of legal discussion, Justice Boreham rejected the diminished responsibility plea and the expert testimonies of the four psychiatrists, insisting that the case should be dealt with by a jury. The trial proper was set to commence on 5 May 1981.

Havers drew controversy at the outset of the trial, when he said of Sutcliffe's victims in his introductory speech: "Some were prostitutes, but perhaps the saddest part of the case is that some were not. The last six attacks were on totally respectable women." In response to this remark, the English Collective of Prostitutes accused Havers of "condoning the murder of prostitutes", and women demonstrated outside the Old Bailey with placards in protest.

The trial lasted a fortnight and, despite the efforts of his counsel James Chadwin, QC, Sutcliffe was found guilty of murder on all counts and sentenced to life imprisonment.

=== Role in the Guildford Four and Maguire family miscarriages of justice ===
Havers represented the Crown in two high-profile Troubles-related miscarriages of justice in British judicial history: the trial and appeal of the Guildford Four and also of the Maguire family (known as the Maguire Seven), all of whom were wrongfully convicted. Collectively, they served a total of 113 years in prison. One of the Maguire Seven, Giuseppe Conlon, died in prison, convicted on the basis of discredited forensic evidence.

In the case of the Guildford Four, the Director of Public Prosecutions was found to have suppressed alibi evidence that supported Gerry Conlon and Paul Hill's claims of innocence. The Director of Public Prosecutions, for whom Havers was acting, was also found to have suppressed confessions by Provisional IRA bombers, known as the Balcombe Street Gang, claiming responsibility for the Guildford and Woolwich bombings.

In his submission to Sir John May's Inquiry into the Guildford and Woolwich bombings in 1989, Labour MP Chris Mullin cast doubt on Havers's integrity in the matter:

Sir Michael Havers represented the Crown at the trials of the Guildford Four, Mrs. Maguire and her family and at the re-trial/appeal of the Guildford Four. He is, therefore, probably the person who can lay claim to the most detailed knowledge of this affair. I respectfully submit that any inquiry that passed without the benefit of his experience would be deficient....
The only hope of sustaining the original convictions was to rewrite the script from top to bottom. This Sir Michael and his colleagues proceeded to do with ingenuity and relish.

== Personal life ==
Havers married Carol Elizabeth Lay in 1949, with whom he had two sons: Philip Havers, who became a Queen's Counsel like his father, and the actor Nigel Havers. Havers was a member of the Garrick Club, primarily for barristers, judges and actors.

The house at Gothic Lodge, Woodhayes Road, Wimbledon, where Sir Michael and Lady Havers had an apartment, was bombed by the Provisional IRA on 13 November 1981; Havers and his family were in Spain at the time of the attack. A police constable standing guard outside the house was taken to hospital suffering from shock. A master at King's College School, Frank Miles, was in bed in his apartment in the same house, and was unhurt because he had left his sitting room. When discovered, Miles was described as 'like Lear in the storm scene'; he took a bottle of champagne into school the next day, to celebrate his deliverance with his pupils.

Havers had two heart bypass operations in the 1980s. On 1 April 1992, he died from heart failure at St Bartholomew's Hospital in London at the age of 69, after falling ill while working in his office.

Parliament of the United Kingdom
Preceded by Cyril Black	Member of Parliament for Wimbledon; 1970–1987	Succeeded by Charles Goodson-Wickes
Political offices
Preceded by Geoffrey Howe	Solicitor General for England and Wales; 1972–1974	Succeeded by Peter Archer
Preceded by Samuel Silkin	Attorney General for England and Wales; 1979–1987	Succeeded by Patrick Mayhew
Preceded by Samuel Silkin	Attorney General for Northern Ireland; 1979–1987	Succeeded by Patrick Mayhew
Preceded by The Lord Hailsham of St Marylebone	Lord High Chancellor of Great Britain; 1987	Succeeded by The Lord Mackay of Clashfern
