= Sir Joseph Hood Memorial Wood =

Nature reserve in London, England

Coordinates: 51.3897°N 0.2394°W

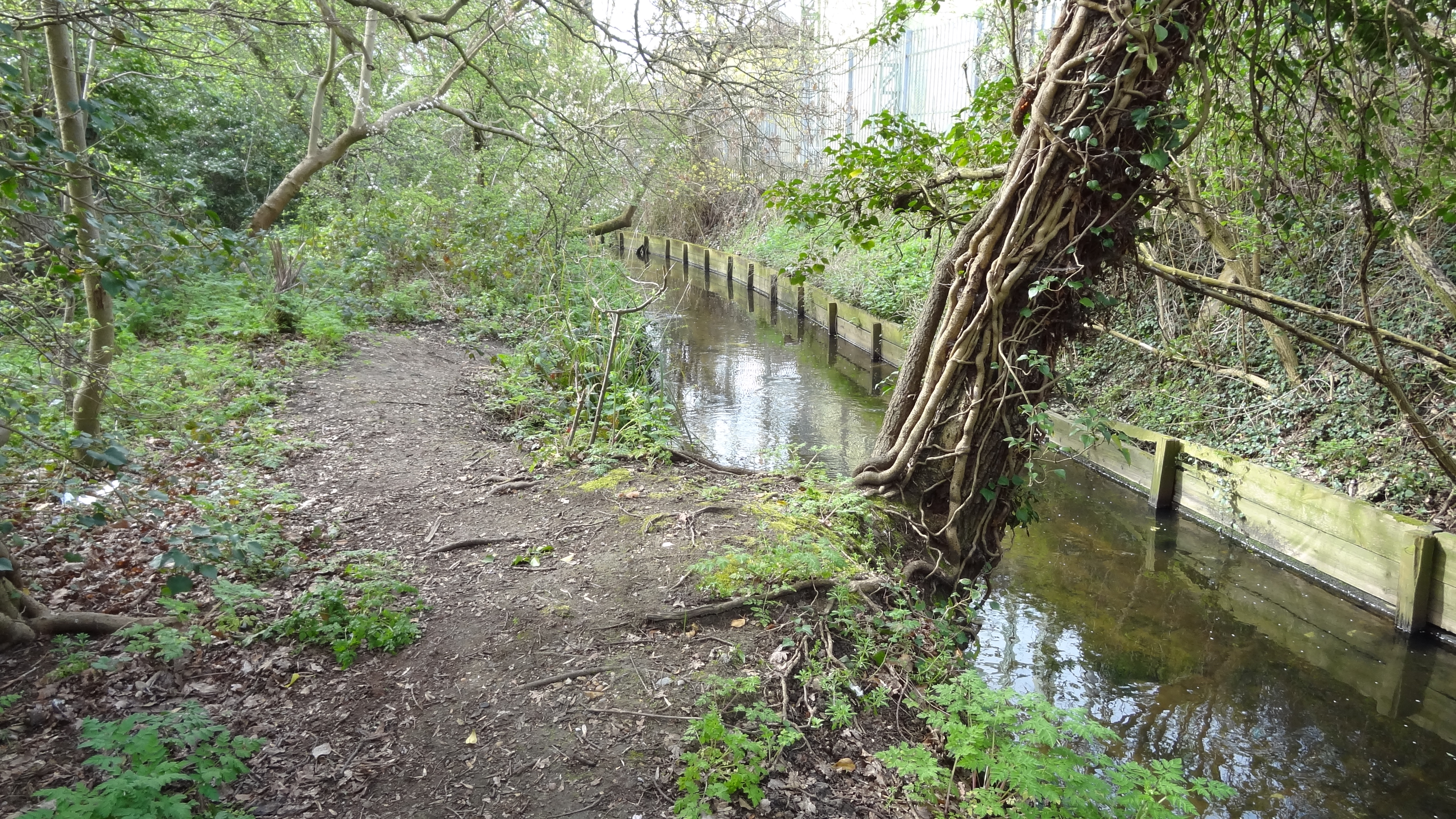
Beverley Brook running along the border of Sir Joseph Hood Memorial Wood (Which has since dried up)

Sir Joseph Hood Memorial Wood is a 1.7 hectare Local Nature Reserve and a Site of Borough Importance for Nature Conservation, Grade I, in Motspur Park in the London Borough of Merton. It adjoins Sir Joseph Hood Memorial Playing Fields, and both are owned and managed by Merton Council.

== History ==
The area was part of an estate which belonged to Merton Priory at the time of the Reformation. In around 1600 it was bought by the Garth family, who were Lords of the Manor of Merton. In the middle of the nineteenth century Richard Garth planted the area which is now the nature reserve with oak trees, probably as a hunting covert. In 1931 Merton and Morden Urban District Council purchased part of the estate, which became the playing fields and wood. It is named after Sir Joseph Hood, a former MP and Mayor of Wimbledon.

== Ecology ==
The wood is bordered by the Beverley Brook, which forms the boundary with the London Borough of Kingston. The site has a wide range of birds, such as nuthatches and treecreepers, and trees, including mature oaks which date to the nineteenth century planting. The diverse shrub layer has species such as Midland hawthorn and ransoms which probably date to an ancient hedgerow predating the wood.

== Access ==
Access is from the playing fields off Marina Avenue.
