= Ballathie House =

Coordinates: 56°30′54.55″N 3°23′13.88″W

Ballathie House Hotel
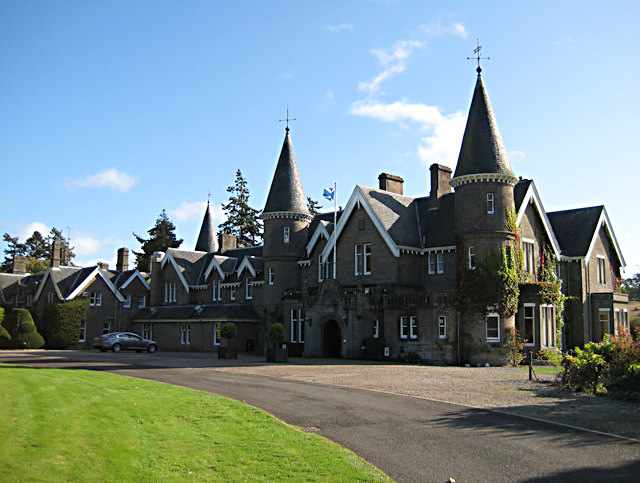
- Interactive map of the Ballathie House Hotel area

General information
- Location: Stanley near Perth, Scotland, United Kingdom
- Opening: 1972

Other information
- Number of rooms: 41 (+ 11 at Lodge)
- Number of suites: 3
- Number of restaurants: 1

Website
- BallathieHouseHotel.com

Ballathie House is a 19th-century mansion in Perthshire, Scotland. It is located around 9 miles (14 km) north of Perth, and 5.5 miles (8.9 km) west of Coupar Angus, close to the River Tay. The present house was built in 1886, and since 1972 it has operated as a country house hotel.

== History ==
=== Before 1886 ===
The Drummond family, the Earls of Perth, owned the Ballathie lands in the 17th century, selling to the Robertson family. According to Historic Environment Scotland, the house was built during the 1850s. General Richardson Robertson of Tullybelton undertook the building of the current house but died in 1883, 3 years before it was completed.

=== Country house, 1886-1972 ===
General Richardson Robertson's nephew, Colonel Edmund Robert Stewart Richardson took over the house, selling it in 1910 to Sir Stuart Coats, from Paisley. The house was enlarged by alterations to the servants quarters and a new entrance porch. Central heating and electric lighting were also installed. An army hut was erected for use as a dance hall after the World War I and dances were held for staff and locals. A 9-hole golf course was laid out by professional golfer Ben Sayers but this was ploughed up as part of the campaign to provide more food during World War II.

Ballathie's fame as a sporting estate led to many famous guests coming to stay during this period. These included:

- Duke Michael of Russia and his wife, Natalia, Princess Brassova
- John Wolfe-Barry, civil engineer whose most famous projects included Tower Bridge and the District Line in London
- Arthur Winnington-Ingram, Bishop of London from 1901 to 1939
- The Prince of Wales, later King Edward VIII
- Hugh Grosvenor, 2nd Duke of Westminster

In 1936, the estate was sold to Colonel Stephen Hardie, a chartered accountant in Glasgow and founder member of the British Oxygen Company. The estate was sold again in 1964 to the Maxwell siblings, descendants of John Maxwell (1879–1940), the film producer and founder of the ABC cinema empire.

When Col. Hardie died in 1969, the house was also acquired by the Maxwell Family, and converted into a hotel in 1972 which was run for many years by Colonel & Mrs Brassey.

=== Hotel, since 1972 ===
IMR Hotels purchased the hotel and the estate in 2024. The estate is used for farming. The Sportsman's Lodge was completed in 2003, within the grounds of the hotel.

== Hotel facilities ==
Ballathie has 25 bedrooms in the main hotel, 12 more at the Sportsman's Lodge. It also has 16 rooms & suites in the Riverside Cottage. It is a venue for wedding ceremonies and receptions and also has rooms for conferences and meetings up to a capacity of 50. The hotel is on the River Tay, a salmon fishing river. Clay pigeon and grouse shooting are available.

=== Awards ===
- VisitScotland, the Scottish tourist board, rates Ballathie as a 4 star hotel.
- The hotel's restaurant received the Silver Award from EatScotland, the restaurant guide of VisitScotland.
- The AA gives the hotel 4 stars and 2 red rosettes.
- Rural Restaurant Award win at the Scottish Hotel Awards 2010.
