= Stuart Coats =

British politician

Sir Stuart Auchincloss Coats Bt KC*PO KC*SG

Member of Parliament for East Surrey
- In office 1918–1922
- Preceded by: New constituency
- Succeeded by: James Galbraith

Member of Parliament for Wimbledon
- In office 1916–1918
- Preceded by: Henry Chaplin
- Succeeded by: Sir Joseph Hood

Personal details
- Born: Stuart Auchincloss Coats; 20 March 1868
- Died: 15 July 1959 (aged 91)
- Political party: Conservative
- Spouse: Jane Muir Greenlees (m. 1891; died 1958)
- Children: 3
- Parent(s): Sir James Coats, 1st Baronet; Sarah Ann Auchincloss Coats
- Relatives: James C. Auchincloss (cousin)

Sir Stuart Auchincloss Coats, 2nd Baronet (20 March 1868 – 15 July 1959) was a British politician and Member of Parliament for Wimbledon from 1916 to 1918 and then East Surrey from 1918 to 1922.

== Early life ==
Stuart was born on 20 March 1868. He was the son of Sarah Ann (née Auchincloss) Coats (1838–1887) and Sir James Coats, 1st Baronet (1834–1913). He succeeded his father to the baronetcy in 1913. His brother Alfred M. Coats remained in the United States.

== Career ==
He unsuccessfully contested the Morpeth constituency as a Liberal Unionist in the 1906 general election and was also an unsuccessful candidate for Deptford in the January and December general elections of 1910. He was elected Conservative Member of Parliament for Wimbledon at a by-election in April 1916 and then for East Surrey in December 1918, retaining his seat until October 1922.

He was also a Private Chamberlain of Sword and Cape to Popes Pius X, Benedict XV, Pius XI and Pius XII.

== Personal life ==
Sir Stuart was married to Jane Muir Greenlees, the daughter of Thomas Greenlees Jr. of Paisley, Renfrewshire, at Castlehead, Paisley, in 1891. Together, they were the parents of:

- Sir James Stuart Coats, 3rd Baronet (1894–1966), who married Lady Amy Gordon-Lennox, eldest daughter of Charles Gordon-Lennox, 8th Duke of Richmond.
- Muir Dudley Coats (1897–1927), who married socialite Audrey Evelyn James, the illegitimate daughter of Edward Grey, 1st Viscount Grey of Fallodon and the illegitimate granddaughter of Edward VII. After his death, Audrey remarried several times, including to American department store heir, Marshall Field III.
- Margaret Mary Josephine Coats (1901–1987), who married Edward Knollys, 2nd Viscount Knollys.

In 1920, his wife was painted by Philip Alexius de László. In 1936, he sold Ballathie House, his family's seat in Perthshire, Scotland, to Colonel Stephen Hardie, a founder of the British Oxygen Company.

Sir Stuart died on 15 July 1959. He was succeeded by his son Sir James Stuart Coats, 3rd Baronet.

=== Descendants ===
Through his daughter Margaret, he was the grandfather of Hon. Ardyne Knollys (b. 1929), and David Knollys, 3rd Viscount Knollys (b. 1931). Through his eldest son, he was the grandfather of Sir Alastair Coats, 4th Baronet (1921–2015).

== Honours ==
- Knight Commander of the Order of Pope Pius IX (with star)
- Knight Commander of the Order of St. Gregory the Great
- Knight Commander of the Order of the Crown of Italy

Parliament of the United Kingdom
Preceded by Henry Chaplin	Member of Parliament for Wimbledon; 1916–1918	Succeeded by Sir Joseph Hood
New constituency	Member of Parliament for East Surrey; 1918–1922	Succeeded by James Galbraith
Baronetage of the United Kingdom
Preceded by James Coats	Baronet (of Auchendrane); 1913–1959	Succeeded by James Stuart Coats
