= 1916 Wimbledon by-election =

UK Parliamentary by-election

The 1916 Wimbledon by-election was held on 19 April 1916. The by-election was held due to the resignation of the incumbent Conservative MP, Henry Chaplin, when he was raised to the peerage. It was won by the Conservative candidate Sir Stuart Coats.

1916 Wimbledon by-election
Party	Candidate	Votes	%	±%
Conservative	Stuart Coats	8,970	55.6	N/A
Independent	Kennedy Jones	7,159	44.4	New
Majority		1,811	11.2	N/A
Turnout		16,129	46.5	N/A
Registered electors		34,719		
Conservative hold		Swing	N/A	
