= Temperance Building Society =

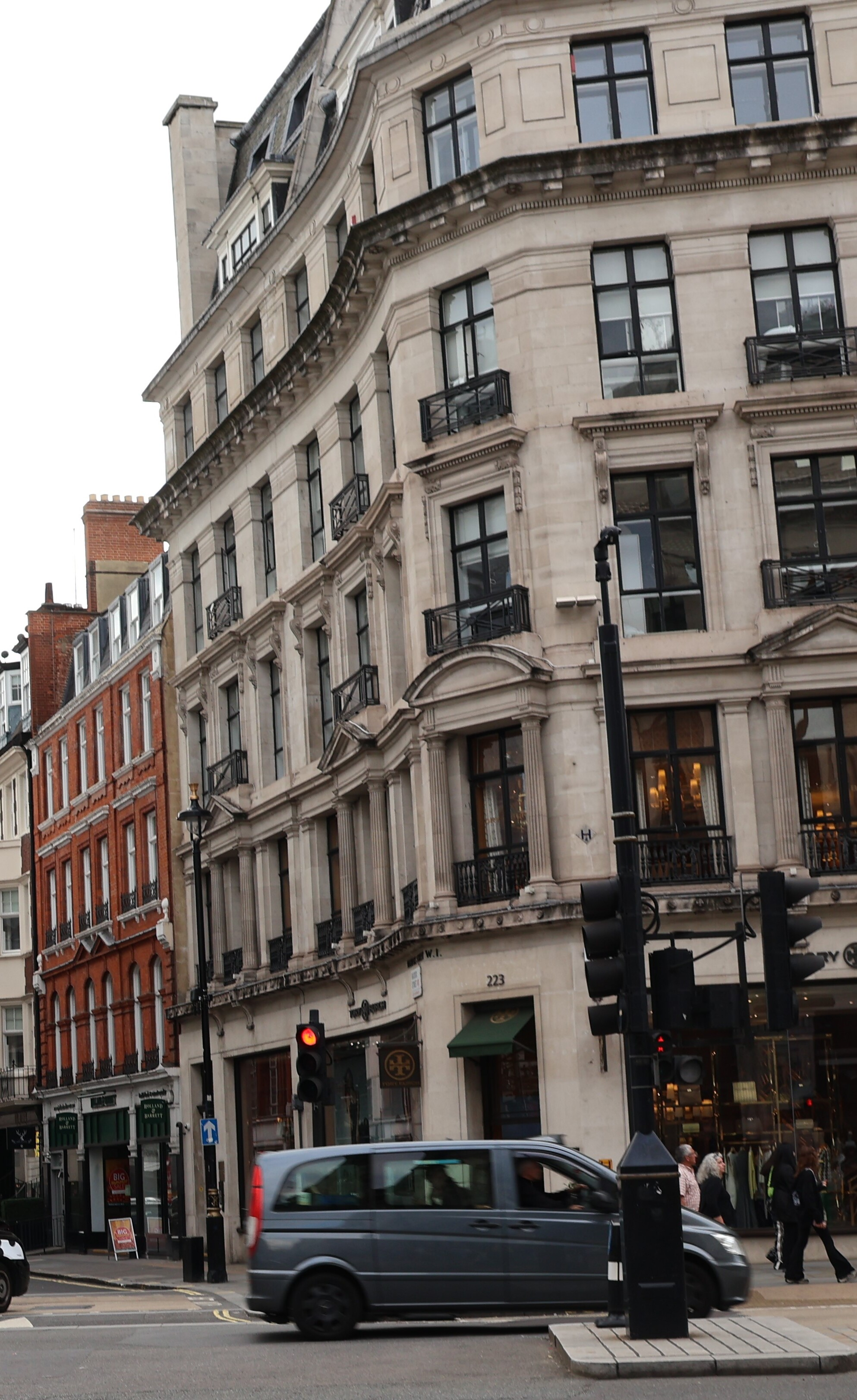
- Former head office at 223–227, Regent Street
- Type: Building society
- Industry: Financial services
- Predecessor: Permanent Temperance Freehold Land and Building Society
- Founded: 1852
- Founder: The British temperance movement
- Defunct: 1974
- Fate: Merged
- Successor: Gateway Building Society and then Woolwich Building Society
- Headquarters: London, United Kingdom
- Area served: England
- Products: Mortgages, savings accounts
- Owner: Its members

The Temperance Building Society was a British building society formed in London in 1854 by non-conformists and abstainers of the temperance movement.

Using only agencies, it grew to be the largest building society in the early 1900s. However, a disinclination to adopt more modern practices led to a relative decline in the inter-war period. A revival began in 1942 when a new general manager was appointed, and a national branch network was established within a couple of years. By the time of the Temperance’s official history in 1954, the Society was once again in the top ten.

In 1974 the Temperance merged with the Bedfordshire Building Society to form the Gateway Building Society, breaking the long-standing association with the temperance movement. The Gateway in turn merged with the Woolwich Equitable in 1988 to form the Woolwich Building Society.

== History ==
=== The early years ===
The preliminary meeting to propose the formation of the Permanent Temperance Freehold Land and Building Society was held at the offices of the London Temperance League in the Strand, London in June 1853. The driving force was a radical solicitor and Unitarian, the 33-year-old William Shaen. Although Shaen was 33 when appointed solicitor to the Society, for 34 years he was “the guide, philosopher and friend of the Society in all matters of policy”. The founding Directors were drawn from industrialists, tradesmen and professionals. Many of them proved very long serving: the blacksmith served 59 years, the draper and statistician, 48 years, and the plumber 43. They were all of a non-conformist tradition and abstainers; each director had to sign a declaration “that he is, and will remain during the tenure of office, a total abstainer from all intoxicating liquor.” Writing in 1954, Price noted that the rule had been strictly enforced for a hundred years, that no director had ever been obliged to resign and that all current directors "had the privilege of signing".

The Society was duly launched in 1854, though it is not clear whether it was with the original long name or the more familiar Temperance Building Society. It operated out of temporary rooms for a year and then took a lease on an office in Moorgate for 9 years before moving to Ludgate Street. The original name included the words “Freehold Land” and like other freehold land societies, the Temperance gave prominence to its land department. The objective was to buy freehold land and divide it into plots for a house and garden, thus conferring a parliamentary vote. The first estate was bought at Stratford, London; it was divided into 227 plots, sold at a profit. In accordance with its temperance philosophy, no plots were to be used for a tavern or manufacture of alcoholic drinks. No more sites were bought but the bulk of advances were still made to builders with the loan transferred to the buyer on the sale of the house.

=== Expansion through Agents ===
The Temperance was essentially a London society – nine decades were to pass before opening a branch outside the metropolis. However, it was willing to appoint agencies and, helped by its extensive non-conformist relationships, by the end of the first year there 90 agents around the country willing to act. Cleary noted that in 1871, the Temperance Society was the only one in London to have branches in the north. By then, growth had come to a stop. A decline in housebuilding left building societies with unsold houses in the late 1860s and in the Temperance 1872 accounts it was thought advisable to write off “a considerable amount for possible depreciation”. In 1870, assets had reached £901,000 but it took more than twenty years before the Society reached that figure again. During this period, the Temperance had faced competition from the Liberator Building Society, controlled by Jabez Balfour the son of one of the Temperance’s founder directors. The Liberator was structured to appeal to the same non-conformist audience and by 1879 it had become the largest society in the country. By1890 it was twice the size of the next largest society; unfortunately for its depositors, it was fraudulent and collapsed in 1892. With the removal of a major competitor, the Temperance’s assets doubled over the next decade and by 1906 exceeded £2m. Between 1906 and 1908 it was the largest building society by assets and though it lost that position in 1909 it remained the largest society in London.

=== Relative Decline ===
Reflecting the work he had done in the community and the abstinence movement, miner’s son Edward Wood was invited to be a director in 1882 and appointed the Society’s Secretary in 1887. He dominated the Society’s affairs for over forty years and for two or three decades was the most prominent figure in the wider building society movement. At the end of WWI, aged 70, Wood said that he would retire but changed his mind and finally retired in 1927, aged 81. However, the Temperance continued with its Victorian outlook, believing that the ideal society was one that stayed in its own locality and did not open branches and concentrated on low value properties for “the thrifty worker”. Other societies expanded vigorously, opening branches and advertising, northern societies moving south and vice versa. Between 1920 and 1935 the assets of some societies increased by twenty or thirty times; in contrast the Temperance’s assts little more than trebled. In 1913, the Temperance’s total assets were 3.10% of the movement. By 1933 this percentage had fallen to 0.98% and then 0.78% in 1939. By contrast, in this period the Abbey Road Society increased assets by nearly seventy times.

=== Branches and growth again ===
A radical change in the Society’s direction came in 1942. Ronald Bell, a prominent Baptist, had been recruited as Assistant Secretary in 1939 and three years later was appointed General Manager and Secretary, under the Chairmanship of Sir Cyril Black. Almost immediately a new headquarters office was opened at 223–227 Regent Street, but it was the reversal of the branch policy that was the most significant. Between 1943 and 1945, twenty branches were opened around the country, including Glasgow and Edinburgh, and the West Middlesex Building Society was also acquired in 1945. A further two branches had been opened by 1948 and it was still 22 branches at the time of the 1954 history. Assets rose from £6.6m in 1943 to £30m in 1952. By size the Temperance had become number nine in the country and four in London and, at the time of writing, the history claimed that there were only six societies that had larger assets.

=== Thereafter ===
After the publication of the 1954 history, little information appears to be publicly available. There were a couple of small building society acquisitions – the Worthing Building Society in 1957 and the Finchley in 1973. In 1974 the Temperance merged with the Bedfordshire Building Society to form the Gateway Building Society. The Gateway in turn merged with the Woolwich Equitable in 1988 to form the Woolwich Building Society.
