= James Coats =

British skeleton racer

Lieutenant colonel Sir James Stuart Coats, 3rd Baronet MC (13 April 1894 – 26 October 1966) was a British skeleton racer who competed in the late 1940s. He finished seventh in the men's skeleton event at the 1948 Winter Olympics in St. Moritz. He served as President of the St. Moritz Tobogganing Club from 1954 to 1956.

He married Lady Amy Gwendolin Gordon-Lennox, daughter of Charles Gordon-Lennox, 8th Duke of Richmond in 1917.

Coats was awarded the Military Cross in 1918.

Coats was a retired lieutenant colonel of the British Army at the time of the 1948 Winter Olympics. During World War II he commanded the Coats Mission charged with evacuating the royal family in the event of a German invasion.

Baronetage of the United Kingdom
Preceded by Stuart Coats	Baronet (of Auchendrane); 1959–1966	Succeeded by Alastair Coats
