= Charles Goodson-Wickes =

Charles Goodson-Wickes, DL (born 7 November 1945) is a company director, business consultant and consulting physician.

From 1987 to 1997 he was the British Conservative Member of Parliament for Wimbledon. He served in The Life Guards in the British Army, attaining the rank of lieutenant colonel, and served in the First Gulf War. He was the principal for two occupational health practices, advising Barclays Bank, Rio Tinto and other multi-national companies from 1980 to 1994. He was a consulting physician for Bupa from 1976 to 1986. He was the founder chairman of the Countryside Alliance. He is the great-grandson of Sir Frank Fox, OBE (1874–1960).

== Education ==
Goodson-Wickes was educated at Charterhouse, St Bartholomew's Hospital and Inner Temple. He is qualified both as a physician (1970) and as a barrister (called to the Bar in 1972).

== Political career ==
A lifelong member of the Conservative Party, Goodson-Wickes was elected to the House of Commons in 1987 representing Wimbledon, having previously unsuccessfully contested Islington Central in 1979. While an MP he served as Parliamentary private secretary in the Departments of the Treasury, Environment and Transport. Goodson-Wickes lost his Wimbledon seat to Labour in the 1997 landslide win.

He was an adviser on Public Appointments, V-C of Defence Ctte, and an Industry and Parliament Trust fellow. After Parliament, he served as V-Chm CFCC (Conservative Foreign and Commonwealth Council) 1997–2011.

== Military career ==
Goodson-Wickes was a parachute-trained British Army officer and served as surgeon captain (medical officer) in The Life Guards, serving in Northern Ireland, Cyprus and Germany (1973–1977). In 1977 he was appointed as Silver Stick medical officer, Household Cavalry. He remained a member of Regular Army Reserve of Officers (RARO) until 2000. He re-enlisted in 1991 as a lieutenant colonel to serve in the First Gulf War with HQ 7th Armoured Brigade, seeing action in the advance from Saudi Arabia through Iraq to the liberation of Kuwait. He was the first sitting member of the House of Commons to see active service in the armed forces since World War II.

== Business career ==
Goodson-Wickes has served as director of two FTSE 250 companies: Nestor Healthcare Group Plc (1993–1999) and Gyrus Group Plc (1997–2007) and other companies. He is currently the chief executive of consultancy company Medarc Ltd and the chairman of the board of directors Thomas Greg and Sons Ltd, security printers operating in North and South America, India, China and the Philippines.

== Charity and public service ==
Goodson-Wickes was founder chairman (1997–1999) and is now patron of the Countryside Alliance. Previously he was chairman of British Field Sports Society (1994–97) and negotiated the merger with the Countryside Business Group and the Countryside Movement. He was chairman of the Rural Trust from 1999, until absorbed into the Prince's Countryside Fund in 2014. From 1998 to 2007 Goodson-Wickes was chief executive of the London Playing Fields Foundation (chairman 1997–1998) and a member of the London Sports Board (2000–2003). He is vice president of the Great Bustard Group (since 2008) which is re-introducing the great bustard to Great Britain. He is vice president (since 1990) of the Ex-Servicemen's Mental Welfare Society, better known as Combat Stress.

He was the director general of Canning House (2010–12), the London-based foundation dedicated to the promotion of diplomatic, political, commercial and cultural relations between the UK, Latin America and Iberia. He is a Freeman of the City of London (2014) and has been a deputy lieutenant of Greater London since 1999. He was appointed as the Representative Deputy Lieutenant for the London Borough of Islington in 2011.

Parliament of the United Kingdom
Preceded by Michael Havers	Member of Parliament for Wimbledon; 1987–1997	Succeeded by Roger Casale
