= Audrey Evelyn James Coats =

The Honourable Audrey Evelyn James Coats
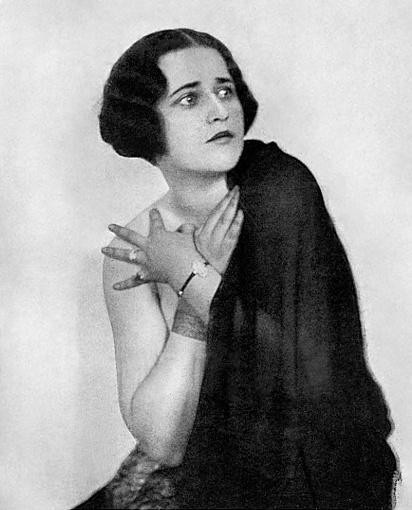
- Coats, Tatler cover, 1925
- Born: Audrey Evelyn James; 21 April 1902
- Died: 14 February 1968 (aged 65)
- Spouses: Muir Dudley Coats (m. 1922; died 1927) Marshall Field III (m. 1930; div. 1934) Hon. Peter Pleydell-Bouverie (m. 1938; div. 1946)
- Parent(s): Evelyn Elizabeth Forbes; William Dodge James; The 1st Viscount Grey of Fallodon (biological father)
- Relatives: Edward VII (grandfather); Edward James (brother)

Audrey Evelyn James (married names Coats, Field, and Pleydell-Bouverie) (21 April 1902 – 14 February 1968) was an English socialite included in The Book of Beauty by Cecil Beaton. Through her mother she was allegedly the illegitimate granddaughter of King Edward VII, and she herself was the illegitimate daughter of The 1st Viscount Grey of Fallodon.

== Early life ==
Audrey Evelyn James was born on 21 April 1902, officially the daughter of William Dodge James and Evelyn Elizabeth Forbes. Her siblings are Helen Millicent Howard; Alexandra Maud Venetia Fawcus; Silvia Helena Sophia Wilson; and Edward James.

Edward James, in his memoirs, claims that rather than being the son of Edward VII, he was his grandson, his grandmother having had an affair with the Prince of Wales. William Dodge James was undisturbed by this, as he remained on receiving an anonymous letter telling him that Audrey James was not his daughter. Audrey's biological father was alleged to be Sir Edward Grey, who was later created The 1st Viscount Grey of Fallodon, the British Liberal statesman and Foreign Secretary.

== Personal life ==
Coats was a popular debutante and attracted the admiration of many admirers, chief among them Lord Louis Mountbatten. He proposed marriage after a few weeks of meeting and they were engaged. However the engagement was soon broken off and the couple moved on to different partners. She become engaged to Muir Coats. An epigram ran in social circles about her two engagements that "She traded the Coat of Arms for Arms of Coat". On 25 March 1922 Audrey James married Muir Dudley Coats, son of Sir Stuart Auchincloss Coats, 2nd Bt. and Jane Muir Greenlees. Before Muir Dudley Coats' death, they were the parents of one son, Peter Coats (b. 1923), who died at 4 days old.

On 18 August 1930 she married Marshall Field III and in 1933 she was included in The Book of Beauty by Cecil Beaton. In 1930, they went on a private game hunting expedition to Africa and obtained several lion specimens from the expedition. She and her husband were divorced in Reno, Nevada in 1934.

In January 1936, it was reported that she had adopted a one-year-old boy as her son.

On 25 November 1938 she married Hon. Peter Pleydell-Bouverie, son of Jacob Pleydell-Bouverie, 6th Earl of Radnor and Julian Eleanor Adelaide Balfour. They divorced in 1946.

Coats died on 14 February 1968.
