= Roger Casale =

British politician (born 1960)

Member of Parliament for Wimbledon
- In office 1 May 1997 – 11 April 2005
- Preceded by: Charles Goodson-Wickes
- Succeeded by: Stephen Hammond

Personal details
- Born: 22 May 1960 (age 66)
- Party: Labour (until 2017)
- Other political affiliations: Change UK (2019)
- Education: Brasenose College, Oxford
- Committees: European Scrutiny Committee

Roger Mark Casale (born 22 May 1960) was the Labour Member of Parliament for Wimbledon, England from 1997 to 2005.

In June 2013, Casale founded New Europeans, a pro-EU campaigning group.

== Early life ==
He was educated at King's College School, Hurstpierpoint College, Brasenose College, Oxford, and Johns Hopkins University.

== Political career ==
He gained the Wimbledon seat at the 1997 general election, one of the surprise results of the Labour landslide as Wimbledon had only ever previously been won by the Labour Party at the 1945 general election. Casale successfully retained the seat with a slightly increased majority at the 2001 general election but lost it to the Conservatives at the 2005 general election.

== After Parliament ==
Since losing his seat Casale has run his own parliamentary advisors company, Roger Casale Associates Ltd. In June 2013, Casale founded New Europeans, a pro-EU campaigning group.

In May 2017, Casale resigned from Labour in order to contest the Vauxhall constituency, held by Kate Hoey, a pro-Brexit Labour MP. For this purpose, Casale announced the creation of Yes2Europe as a new political party. Lambeth for Europe, the local pro-EU group, did not endorse Casale, instead opting for the Liberal Democrat candidate, George Turner. In the end, Casale did not contest the constituency in the 2017 general election.

In 2019, Casale joined Change UK and became a candidate for the party in the 2019 European Parliament election, contesting the seven-member constituency of East of England. The party polled 3.7%; he was the last candidate on Change UK's party list for the constituency and was not elected.

Parliament of the United Kingdom
Preceded by Charles Goodson-Wickes	Member of Parliament for Wimbledon; 1997–2005	Succeeded by Stephen Hammond
