= Wimbledon (constituency) =

Parliamentary constituency in the United Kingdom, 1885 onwards

Coordinates: 51.417°N 0.218°W

- Borough constituency for the House of Commons
- Interactive map of boundaries from 2024
- Location within Greater London
- County: Greater London
- Electorate: 74,641 (March 2020)
- Major settlements: Wimbledon, Raynes Park, Morden, Motspur Park

Current constituency
- Created: 1885
- Member of Parliament: Paul Kohler (Liberal Democrats)
- Seats: One
- Created from: Mid Surrey (northern half of)
- During its existence contributed to new seat(s) of: Mitcham; Merton and Morden (later consolidated)

Wimbledon is a constituency in Greater London represented in the House of Commons of the UK Parliament. Since 2024, the seat has been held by Paul Kohler of the Liberal Democrats.

== History ==
The area was created by the Redistribution of Seats Act 1885, having lain in Mid Surrey which elected two MPs. The constituency covered great bounds, skirting around Croydon to its south to reach Caterham, Warlingham, Chelsham and Farleigh in the North Downs and bearing formal alternate titles of the "Wimbledon Division (of Surrey)" and the "North East Division of Surrey" which in all but the most formal legal writing was written as "North East Surrey".

An Act reduced the seat in 1918 to create the Mitcham seat in the south-east; another in 1950 created Merton and Morden in the south. These later merged to form Mitcham and Morden.

=== Political history ===
Since 1885 the seat has always elected Conservative MPs except from 1945 to 1950 and 1997–2005 when the Labour candidate won the seat during that party's national landslide years, as well as in 2024 when the Liberal Democrats candidate won the seat during the Labour Party national landslide. While the 2005 Conservative majority was marginal, the 2010 majority was 24.1% of the vote, making the constituency a safe seat for the Conservative Party. It had previously also been considered a safe seat for the party until the 1997 general election.

Since 1990, the ward of Merton Park has only ever returned councillors for Merton Park Ward Residents Association. Since 1994 the ward of West Barnes, which contains Merton's half of the town of Motspur Park, has swung between the Conservatives and the Liberal Democrats; the latter presently hold all three seats in the ward. At the local elections in 2018, Liberal Democrat councillors were elected for the wards of Trinity and Dundonald for the first time in the borough's history, with a further first time win for the Liberal Democrats in a by-election in the Cannon Hill ward in 2019.

In 2010, the second-placed candidate was a Liberal Democrat. The national collapse in the Liberal Democrat vote at the 2015 election meant that the Liberal Democrats did not return to 2nd place until 2019, when they did so with a 22.7% upswing in their vote. The made the seat one of the most marginal in the country and was a top Liberal Democrat target and Conservative defence for the 2024 general election.

At the 2016 referendum on the UK's membership of the European Union, the London Borough of Merton, of which the constituency is a part, voted to remain by 62.9%, and 70.6% of this constituency itself voted to remain in the European Union. In September 2019 the incumbent, Stephen Hammond lost his party's whip for rebelling on a key Brexit vote. He briefly sat as an independent and the whip was restored on 29 October 2019, with 9 of 21 other rebels of the same party.

The seat became marginal at the 2019 General Election with only a 1.2% majority for the Conservative Candidate. According to analysis by the New Statesman the Liberal Democrats, rather than the Conservatives, would have won the seat if the 2019 election had been held on the new 2024 boundaries.

At the 2024 general election, the Liberal Democrats won the traditionally Conservative seat for the first time, turning it into a strong Liberal Democrat seat with a current majority of 12,610. The Liberal Democrats won a record breaking 72 seats during this election with the Conservatives losing a historic 251 seats.

=== Prominent frontbenchers ===
- Henry Chaplin was sworn of the Privy Council in 1885 when he was Chancellor of the Duchy of Lancaster until 1886. He became the first President of the Board of Agriculture as part of the Cabinet (1889–1892). In the Conservative cabinet of 1895 to 1900 he was President of the Local Government Board and was responsible for the Agricultural Rates Act 1896
- Sir Michael Havers reached the highest judicial and legal position in the country for four months in 1987, Lord High Chancellor of Great Britain who also acted as Lord Speaker. For eight years previously, Havers was Attorney General for England, Wales and Northern Ireland, having served as the more junior, Solicitor General in the Heath ministry

== Boundaries ==
=== Historic ===
1885–1918: The Sessional Division of Croydon except so much as is within a district of the Metropolis, the parishes of Caterham, Chelsham, Farley, Warlingham, Merton, and Wimbledon, so much of the Parliamentary Borough of Deptford as is in Surrey, and the area of the Parliamentary Boroughs of Battersea and Clapham, Camberwell, Lambeth, Newington, Southwark, and Wandsworth.

1918–1950: The Municipal Borough of Wimbledon, and the Urban District of Merton and Morden.

Map of boundaries 2010–2024

1950–1955: The Municipal Boroughs of Wimbledon, and Malden and Coombe.

1955–1974: The Municipal Borough of Wimbledon.

1974–1983: The London Borough of Merton wards of Cannon Hill, Priory, West Barnes, Wimbledon East, Wimbledon North, Wimbledon South, and Wimbledon West.

1983–2010: The London Borough of Merton wards of Abbey, Cannon Hill, Dundonald, Durnsford, Hillside, Merton Park, Raynes Park, Trinity, Village, and West Barnes.

2010–2024: As above except Durnsford ward had been replaced by Wimbledon Park ward following a local authority boundary review.

=== Current ===
Following the 2023 review of Westminster constituencies, which came into effect for the 2024 general election, the constituency was defined as being composed of:

- The Royal Borough of Kingston upon Thames wards of: Old Malden; St James.
- The London Borough of Merton wards of: Abbey; Hillside; Merton Park; Raynes Park; Village; Wandle; West Barnes; Wimbledon Park; Wimbledon Town & Dundonald.

The Merton Borough wards reflect the local authority boundary review which became effective on 4 May 2022, with the Cannon Hill ward being moved to Mitcham and Morden. The wards of Old Malden and St. James (as they existed on 1 December 2020) were transferred from Kingston and Surbiton.

A local government boundary review becoming effective in May 2022 was also carried out in Kingston upon Thames, but the Electoral Changes Order was not passed until 1 April 2021. Consequently, the parts in Kingston upon Thames now comprise the Motspur Park & Old Malden East ward, nearly all of the Old Malden ward, and parts of the Green Lane & St James, and New Malden Village wards.

== Constituency profile ==
The seat has a commuter-sustained suburban economy with an imposing shopping centre, privately built and owned or rented homes and a range of open green spaces, ranging in value from elevated Wimbledon Village – sandwiched between Wimbledon Common and Wimbledon Park – where most homes exceed £1,000,000 – to Merton Abbey ruins and South Wimbledon, with more social housing in its wards.

Wimbledon station is a southern terminus of the District line, as well as a station on the South West main line. It is also the western terminus of the Croydon Tramlink. South Wimbledon is a station on the Northern line branch to Morden.

Workless claimants who were registered jobseekers were in November 2012 significantly lower than the national average of 3.8%, at 1.5% of the population based on a statistical compilation by The Guardian.

== Members of Parliament ==
Election	Member	Party
1885	Cosmo Bonsor	Conservative
1900	Eric Hambro	Conservative
1907 by-election	Henry Chaplin	Conservative
1916 by-election	Stuart Coats	Conservative
1918	Sir Joseph Hood	Conservative
1924	Sir John Power	Conservative
1945	Arthur Palmer	Labour
1950	Sir Cyril Black	Conservative
1970	Sir Michael Havers	Conservative
1987	Charles Goodson-Wickes	Conservative
1997	Roger Casale	Labour
2005	Stephen Hammond	Conservative
Sep 2019	Stephen Hammond	Independent
Oct 2019	Stephen Hammond	Conservative
2024	Paul Kohler	Liberal Democrats

== Election results ==
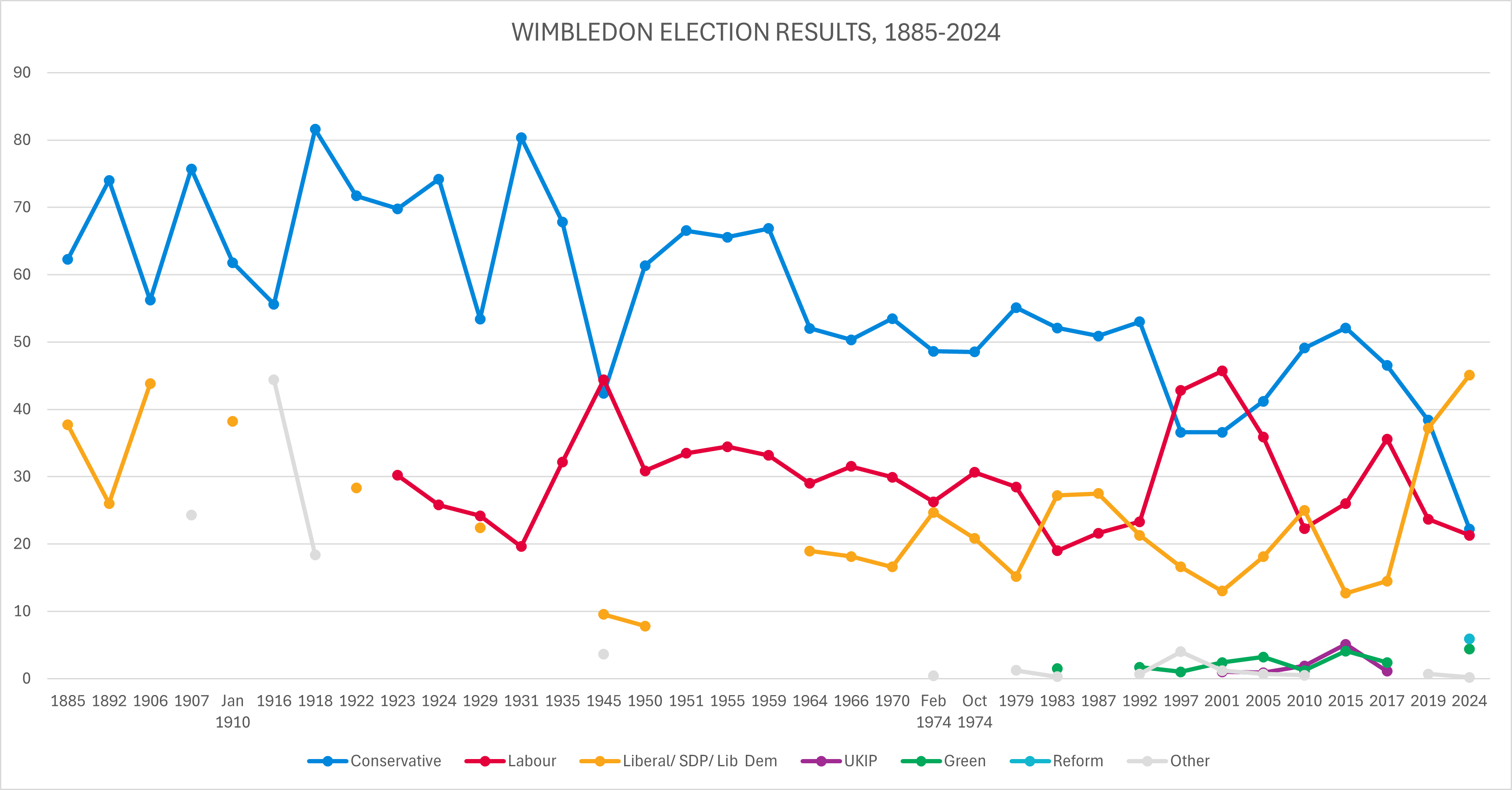
Election results 1885-2024

=== Elections in the 2020s ===
General election 2024: Wimbledon
Party	Candidate	Votes	%	±%
Liberal Democrats	Paul Kohler	24,790	45.1	+6.8
Conservative	Danielle Dunfield-Prayero	12,180	22.2	–17.6
Labour	Eleanor Stringer	11,733	21.3	+0.5
Reform	Ben Cronin	3,221	5.9	+5.7
Green	Rachel Brooks	2,442	4.4	+4.2
Workers Party	Aaron Mafi	341	0.6	N/A
Independent	Sarah Barber	129	0.2	N/A
Independent	Amy Lynch	80	0.1	N/A
Heritage	Michael Watson	69	0.1	N/A
Majority		12,610	22.9	N/A
Turnout		54,985	72.0	−4.2
Registered electors		76,334		
Liberal Democrats gain from Conservative		Swing	▲12.0	

=== Elections in the 2010s ===
2019 notional result
Party	Vote	%
Conservative	22,617	39.8
Liberal Democrats	21,778	38.3
Labour	11,834	20.8
Others	366	0.6
Green	138	0.2
Brexit Party	139	0.2
Turnout	56,872	76.2
Electorate	74,641	

General election 2019: Wimbledon
Party	Candidate	Votes	%	±%
Conservative	Stephen Hammond	20,373	38.4	–8.1
Liberal Democrats	Paul Kohler	19,745	37.2	+22.7
Labour	Jackie Schneider	12,543	23.7	–11.9
Independent	Graham Hadley	366	0.7	N/A
Majority		628	1.2	–9.7
Turnout		53,027	77.7	+0.5
Registered electors		68,232		
Conservative hold		Swing	–15.4	

General election 2017: Wimbledon
Party	Candidate	Votes	%	±%
Conservative	Stephen Hammond	23,946	46.5	–5.6
Labour	Imran Uddin (Note: The day before the vote Cllr Uddin (Labour) and his solicitors' business co-owner had their practising certificates suspended by their professional regulator, who seized the business' files and took control of its accounts. Crescent Law, the firm, specialises in personal injury. An investigation was opened into possible misconduct or unethical practices; it was set to report within weeks. Cllr Uddin remained on the ballot paper and his local Party took no action given the early stage of the intervention.)	18,324	35.6	+9.6
Liberal Democrats	Carl Quilliam	7,472	14.5	+1.8
Green	Charles Barraball	1,231	2.4	–1.7
UKIP	Strachan McDonald	553	1.1	–4.0
Majority		5,622	10.9	–15.2
Turnout		51,526	77.2	+3.7
Registered electors		66,780		
Conservative hold		Swing	–7.6	

General election 2015: Wimbledon
Party	Candidate	Votes	%	±%
Conservative	Stephen Hammond	25,225	52.1	+3.0
Labour	Andrew Judge	12,606	26.0	+3.7
Liberal Democrats	Shas Sheehan	6,129	12.7	–12.3
UKIP	Peter Bucklitsch	2,476	5.1	+3.2
Green	Charles Barraball	1,986	4.1	+2.9
Majority		12,619	26.1	+2.0
Turnout		48,422	73.5	+0.5
Registered electors		65,853		
Conservative hold		Swing	–0.4	

General election 2010: Wimbledon
Party	Candidate	Votes	%	±%
Conservative	Stephen Hammond	23,257	49.1	+7.7
Liberal Democrats	Shas Sheehan	11,849	25.0	+6.8
Labour	Andrew Judge	10,550	22.3	–13.4
UKIP	Mark McAleer	914	1.9	+1.0
Green	Rajeev Thacker	590	1.2	–1.9
Christian	David Martin	235	0.5	N/A
Majority		11,408	24.1	+18.8
Turnout		47,395	73.0	+5.2
Registered electors		65,723		
Conservative hold		Swing	+0.4	

=== Elections in the 2000s ===
General election 2005: Wimbledon
Party	Candidate	Votes	%	±%
Conservative	Stephen Hammond	17,886	41.2	+4.6
Labour	Roger Casale	15,585	35.9	–9.8
Liberal Democrats	Stephen Gee	7,868	18.1	+5.1
Green	Giles Barrow	1,374	3.2	+0.8
UKIP	Andrew Mills	408	0.9	–0.1
Independent	Christopher Coverdale	211	0.5	N/A
Tiger's Eye – the Party for Kids	Alastair Wilson	50	0.1	N/A
Rainbow Dream Ticket	George Weiss	22	0.1	N/A
Majority		2,301	5.3	N/A
Turnout		43,404	68.1	+3.8
Registered electors		63,696		
Conservative gain from Labour		Swing	+7.2	

General election 2001: Wimbledon
Party	Candidate	Votes	%	±%
Labour	Roger Casale	18,806	45.7	+2.9
Conservative	Stephen Hammond	15,062	36.6	0.0
Liberal Democrats	Martin Pierce	5,341	13.0	–3.6
Green	Rajeev Thacker	1,007	2.4	+1.4
CPA	Roger Glencross	479	1.2	N/A
UKIP	Mariana Bell	414	1.0	N/A
Majority		3,744	9.1	+2.9
Turnout		41,109	64.3	–11.1
Registered electors		63,930		
Labour hold		Swing	+1.5	

=== Elections in the 1990s ===
General election 1997: Wimbledon
Party	Candidate	Votes	%	±%
Labour	Roger Casale	20,674	42.8	+19.5
Conservative	Charles Goodson-Wickes	17,684	36.6	–16.4
Liberal Democrats	Alison Willott	8,014	16.6	+4.7
Referendum	Abid Hameed	993	2.1	N/A
Green	Rajeev Thacker	474	1.0	–0.7
ProLife Alliance	Sophie Davies	346	0.7	N/A
Mongolian Barbeque Great Place to Party	Matthew Kirby	112	0.2	N/A
Rainbow Dream Ticket	Graham Stacey	47	0.1	N/A
Majority		2,990	6.2	N/A
Turnout		48,344	75.4	–2.8
Registered electors		64,113		
Labour gain from Conservative		Swing	–17.9	

General election 1992: Wimbledon
Party	Candidate	Votes	%	±%
Conservative	Charles Goodson-Wickes	26,331	53.0	+2.1
Labour	Kingsley Abrams	11,570	23.3	+1.8
Liberal Democrats	Alison Willott	10,569	21.3	–6.2
Green	Vaughan Flood	860	1.7	N/A
Natural Law	Hugh Godfrey	181	0.4	N/A
Independent	Graham Hadley	170	0.3	N/A
Majority		14,761	29.7	+6.3
Turnout		49,681	80.2	+4.1
Registered electors		61,917		
Conservative hold		Swing	+0.15	

=== Elections in the 1980s ===
General election 1987: Wimbledon
Party	Candidate	Votes	%	±%
Conservative	Charles Goodson-Wickes	24,538	50.9	–1.3
Liberal	Adrian Slade	13,237	27.5	+0.3
Labour	Christine Bickerstaff	10,428	21.6	+2.7
Majority		11,301	23.4	–1.5
Turnout		48,203	76.1	+3.7
Registered electors		63,353		
Conservative hold		Swing	–0.8	

General election 1983: Wimbledon
Party	Candidate	Votes	%	±%
Conservative	Michael Havers	24,169	52.1	–3.0
Liberal	David J. Twigg	12,623	27.2	+12.0
Labour	Rock Tansey	8,806	19.0	–9.5
Ecology	Antony Jones	717	1.5	N/A
Party of Associates with Licensees	E.J. Weakner	114	0.3	N/A
Majority		11,546	24.9	–1.7
Turnout		46,429	72.4	–4.0
Registered electors		64,132		
Conservative hold		Swing	–7.5	

=== Elections in the 1970s ===
General election 1979: Wimbledon
Party	Candidate	Votes	%	±%
Conservative	Michael Havers	27,567	55.10	+6.57
Labour	Rock Tansey	14,252	28.48	–2.64
Liberal	David J. Twigg	7,604	15.20	–5.63
National Front	Anthony Bailey	612	1.22	N/A
Majority		13,315	26.62	+8.73
Turnout		50,035	76.42	+7.62
Registered electors		65,471		
Conservative hold		Swing	+9.21	

General election October 1974: Wimbledon
Party	Candidate	Votes	%	±%
Conservative	Michael Havers	23,615	48.53	–0.09
Labour	K. Bill	14,909	30.64	+2.39
Liberal	K. Searby	10,133	20.83	–3.86
Majority		8,706	17.89	–4.48
Turnout		48,657	68.80	–8.95
Registered electors		70,726		
Conservative hold		Swing	–1.24	

General election February 1974: Wimbledon
Party	Candidate	Votes	%	±%
Conservative	Michael Havers	26,542	48.62	–4.85
Labour	K. Bill	14,329	26.25	–3.67
Liberal	K. Searby	13,478	24.69	+8.08
Independent	Bill Boaks	240	0.44	N/A
Majority		12,213	22.37	–1.18
Turnout		54,589	77.75	+11.92
Registered electors		70,210		
Conservative hold		Swing	–0.59	

General election 1970: Wimbledon
Party	Candidate	Votes	%	±%
Conservative	Michael Havers	15,285	53.47	+3.14
Labour	Ralph C. Holmes	8,554	29.92	–1.61
Liberal	John Reginald MacDonald	4,749	16.61	–2.19
Majority		6,731	23.55	+4.75
Turnout		28,588	66.83	–8.16
Registered electors		42,774		
Conservative hold		Swing	+2.375	

=== Elections in the 1960s ===
General election 1966: Wimbledon
Party	Candidate	Votes	%	±%
Conservative	Cyril Black	15,191	50.33	–1.70
Labour	Tom Braddock	9,517	31.53	+2.53
Liberal	John Reginald MacDonald	5,475	18.14	–0.83
Majority		5,674	18.80	–4.22
Turnout		30,183	74.99	+0.11
Registered electors		40,248		
Conservative hold		Swing	–2.11	

General election 1964: Wimbledon
Party	Candidate	Votes	%	±%
Conservative	Cyril Black	15,952	52.03	–14.83
Labour	John R. Daly	8,891	29.00	–4.15
Liberal	George Scott	5,817	18.97	N/A
Majority		7,061	23.02	–10.69
Turnout		30,660	74.88	–3.55
Registered electors		40,947		
Conservative hold		Swing	–5.34	

=== Elections in the 1950s ===
General election 1959: Wimbledon
Party	Candidate	Votes	%	±%
Conservative	Cyril Black	21,538	66.86	+1.31
Labour	Lawrence M. Kershaw	10,678	33.15	–1.31
Majority		10,860	33.71	+2.61
Turnout		32,216	78.43	+0.16
Registered electors		42,151		
Conservative hold		Swing	+1.31	

General election 1955: Wimbledon
Party	Candidate	Votes	%	±%
Conservative	Cyril Black	22,112	65.55	–0.98
Labour	Greville Janner	11,622	34.45	+0.98
Majority		10,490	31.10	–1.96
Turnout		33,734	78.27	–4.07
Registered electors		43,099		
Conservative hold		Swing	–0.98	

General election 1951: Wimbledon
Party	Candidate	Votes	%	±%
Conservative	Cyril Black	42,218	66.53	+5.20
Labour	Charles Ford	21,242	33.47	+2.61
Majority		20,976	33.06	+2.59
Turnout		63,460	82.34	–3.38
Registered electors		77,067		
Conservative hold		Swing	+2.59	

General election 1950: Wimbledon
Party	Candidate	Votes	%	±%
Conservative	Cyril Black	40,339	61.33	+18.94
Labour	George Leonard Deacon	20,296	30.86	–13.55
Liberal	Ian Forester Gibson	5,136	7.81	–1.75
Majority		20,043	30.47	N/A
Turnout		65,771	85.72	+7.65
Registered electors		76,728		
Conservative gain from Labour		Swing	+16.25	

Substantial loss of territory to create Merton and Morden

=== Elections in the 1940s ===
General election 1945: Wimbledon
Party	Candidate	Votes	%	±%
Labour	Arthur Palmer	30,188	44.41	+12.25
Conservative	Geoffrey Hardy-Roberts	28,820	42.39	–25.45
Liberal	Alick Kay	6,501	9.56	N/A
Common Wealth	K. Horne	2,472	3.64	N/A
Majority		1,368	2.02	N/A
Turnout		67,981	78.07	+10.47
Registered electors		89,363		
Labour gain from Conservative		Swing	+18.85	

=== Elections in the 1930s ===
General election 1935: Wimbledon
Party	Candidate	Votes	%	±%
Conservative	John Power	36,816	67.84	–12.54
Labour	Tom Braddock	17,452	32.16	+12.54
Majority		19,364	35.68	–25.08
Turnout		54,268	67.60	–3.35
Registered electors		80,283		
Conservative hold		Swing	–12.54	

General election 1931: Wimbledon
Party	Candidate	Votes	%	±%
Conservative	John Power	39,643	80.38	+26.98
Labour	Tom Braddock	9,674	19.62	–4.58
Majority		29,969	60.76	+41.56
Turnout		49,317	70.95	+2.15
Registered electors		69,508		
Conservative hold		Swing	+31.56	

=== Elections in the 1920s ===
General election 1929: Wimbledon
Party	Candidate	Votes	%	±%
Unionist	John Power	21,902	53.4	–20.8
Labour	Tom Braddock	9,924	24.2	–1.6
Liberal	Arthur Peters	9,202	22.4	N/A
Majority		11,978	29.2	–19.2
Turnout		41,028	68.8	–3.4
Registered electors		59,654		
Unionist hold		Swing	–9.6	

General election 1924: Wimbledon
Party	Candidate	Votes	%	±%
Unionist	John Power	21,209	74.2	+4.4
Labour	Mark Starr	7,386	25.8	–4.4
Majority		13,823	48.4	+8.8
Turnout		28,595	72.2	+14.9
Registered electors		39,604		
Unionist hold		Swing	+4.4	

General election 1923: Wimbledon
Party	Candidate	Votes	%	±%
Unionist	Joseph Hood	15,495	69.8	–1.9
Labour	Mark Starr	6,717	30.2	N/A
Majority		8,778	39.6	–3.8
Turnout		22,212	57.3	–4.7
Registered electors		38,793		
Unionist hold		Swing	–1.9	

General election 1922: Wimbledon
Party	Candidate	Votes	%	±%
Unionist	Joseph Hood	16,751	71.7	–9.9
Liberal	Robert Oswald Moon	6,627	28.3	N/A
Majority		10,124	43.4	–19.8
Turnout		23,378	62.0	+15.9
Registered electors		37,677		
Unionist hold		Swing	–9.9	

=== Elections in the 1910s ===
General election 1918: Wimbledon
Party		Candidate	Votes	%	±%
C	Unionist	Joseph Hood	13,652	81.6	N/A
	Independent	G.M. Edwardes Jones	3,079	18.4	N/A
Majority			10,573	63.2	N/A
Turnout			16,731	46.1	N/A
Registered electors			36,258		
	Unionist hold		Swing	N/A	
C indicates candidate endorsed by the coalition government.

1916 Wimbledon by-election
Party	Candidate	Votes	%	±%
Conservative	Stuart Coats	8,970	55.6	N/A
Independent	Kennedy Jones	7,159	44.4	N/A
Majority		1,811	11.2	N/A
Turnout		16,129	46.5	N/A
Registered electors		34,719		
Conservative hold		Swing	N/A	

General election December 1910: Wimbledon
Party	Candidate	Votes	%	±%
Conservative	Henry Chaplin	Unopposed		
Registered electors		27,810		
Conservative hold				

General election January 1910: Wimbledon
Party	Candidate	Votes	%	±%
Conservative	Henry Chaplin	14,445	61.8	+5.6
Liberal	Arthur Holland	8,930	38.2	–5.6
Majority		5,515	23.6	+11.2
Turnout		23,375	84.1	+6.8
Registered electors		27,810		
Conservative hold		Swing	+5.6	

=== Elections in the 1900s ===
1907 Wimbledon by-election
Party	Candidate	Votes	%	±%
Conservative	Henry Chaplin	10,263	75.7	+19.5
Independent Liberal	Bertrand Russell	3,299	24.3	N/A
Majority		6,694	51.4	+39.0
Turnout		13,562	57.2	–20.1
Registered electors		23,702		
Conservative hold		Swing		

General election 1906: Wimbledon
Party	Candidate	Votes	%	±%
Conservative	Eric Hambro	9,523	56.2	N/A
Liberal	St George Lane Fox-Pitt	7,409	43.8	N/A
Majority		2,114	12.4	N/A
Turnout		16,932	77.3	N/A
Registered electors		21,899		
Conservative hold		Swing	N/A	

General election 1900: Wimbledon
Party	Candidate	Votes	%	±%
Conservative	Eric Hambro	Unopposed		
Registered electors				
Conservative hold				

=== Elections in the 1890s ===
General election 1895: Wimbledon
Party	Candidate	Votes	%	±%
Conservative	Cosmo Bonsor	Unopposed		
Registered electors				
Conservative hold				

General election 1892: Wimbledon
Party	Candidate	Votes	%	±%
Conservative	Cosmo Bonsor	7,397	74.0	N/A
Liberal	Thomas Arthur Meates	2,602	26.0	N/A
Majority		4,795	48.0	N/A
Turnout		9,999	64.2	N/A
Registered electors		15,582		
Conservative hold		Swing	N/A	

=== Elections in the 1880s ===
General election 1886: Wimbledon
Party	Candidate	Votes	%	±%
Conservative	Cosmo Bonsor	Unopposed		
Registered electors				
Conservative hold				

General election 1885: Wimbledon
Party	Candidate	Votes	%	±%
Conservative	Cosmo Bonsor	6,189	62.3	
Liberal	John Cooper	3,745	37.7	
Majority		2,444	24.6	
Turnout		9,934	70.5	
Registered electors		14,086		
Conservative win (new seat)				

== See also ==
- Parliamentary constituencies in London
