= Hood baronets =

There have been three baronetcies created for people with the surname Hood, one in the Baronetage of Great Britain and two in the Baronetage of the United Kingdom. The first Baronet of the first creation was made Viscount Hood, while the fourth Baronet of the second creation was made Baron St Audries.

- Hood baronets of Catherington (1778): see Viscount Hood
- Hood baronets of Tidlake (1809)
- Hood baronets of Wimbledon (1922)

== See also ==
- Viscount Bridport
- Bateman baronets of Hartington Hall (1806)
- Fuller-Palmer-Acland baronets, of Fairfield
