= Sir Edward Scott, 2nd Baronet =

English landowner and Whig politician

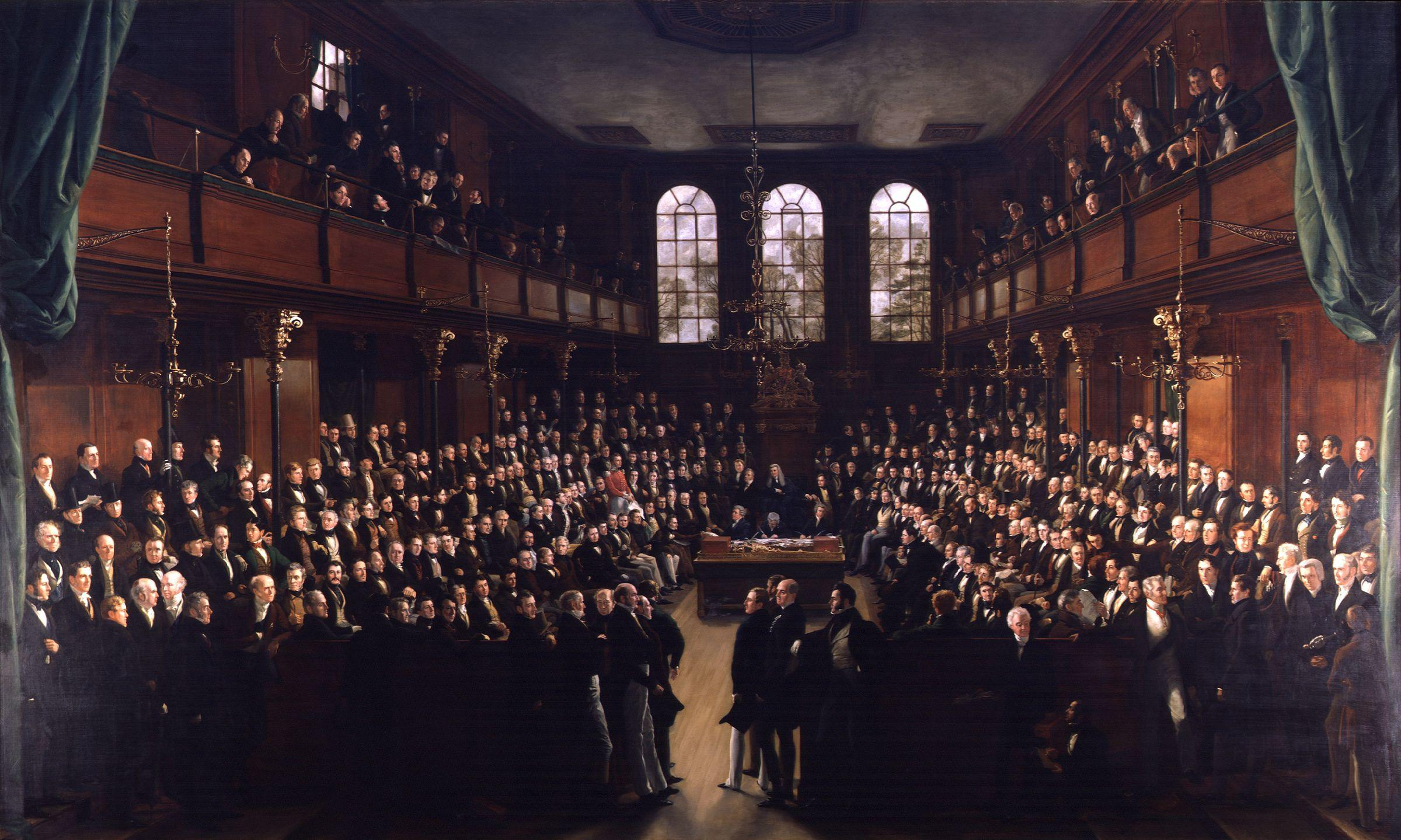
- Born: 22 October 1793
- Died: 27 December 1851
- Occupation: Politician
- Spouse: Catherine Juliana Bateman
- Children: Sir Francis Scott, 3rd Baronet, Sir Edward Dolman Scott, 5th/6th Bt., William Douglas Scott
- Father: Sir Joseph Scott, 1st Baronet

Sir Edward Dolman Scott, 2nd Baronet (22 October 1793 – 27 December 1852) was an English landowner and a Whig politician.

He succeeded to the Baronetcy of Scott of Great Barr and inherited the estate at Great Barr Hall on the death of his father in 1828.

He was Member of Parliament for Lichfield 1831–1837. He was High Sheriff of Staffordshire in 1847. He was also Deputy Lieutenant of Staffordshire and Sussex.

He married twice, firstly on 14 February 1815 to Catherine Juliana Bateman (died 1848), eldest daughter and co-heir of Sir Hugh Bateman, Bart., by whom he had three sons, and secondly in 1848 to Lydia Gisborne. He was succeeded by his son Francis Edward, who had, at birth in 1824, succeeded to the Baronetcy of Bateman of Hartington (see Bateman baronets).

Parliament of the United Kingdom
Preceded by Sir George Anson; George Granville Venables-Vernon	Member of Parliament for Lichfield; 1831–1837; With: Sir George Anson	Succeeded by Sir George Anson; Lord Alfred Henry Paget
Honorary titles
Preceded by John Levett	High Sheriff of Staffordshire; 1847	Succeeded by Hon. Frederick Gough
Baronetage of the United Kingdom
Preceded by Joseph Scott	Baronet (of Great Barr); 1828–1852	Succeeded by Francis Scott
