= Harriet Scott =

Harriet Scott may refer to:

- Harriet Scott (broadcaster) (born 1972), British broadcaster
- Harriet Anne Scott (1816–1894), British novelist
- Harriet Scott (footballer) (born 1993), Irish footballer
- Harriet Robinson Scott (1820–1876), African American abolitionist wife of Dred Scott
- Harriet Morgan (née Scott, 1830–1907) Australian natural history illustrator
