= Sir Joseph Scott, 1st Baronet =

Sir Joseph Scott, 1st Baronet (1752–1828) was an English landowner and politician.

He was the son of William Scott (d. 1753) of Great Barr Hall, then in Staffordshire. In around 1777 he replaced the hall with a new building.

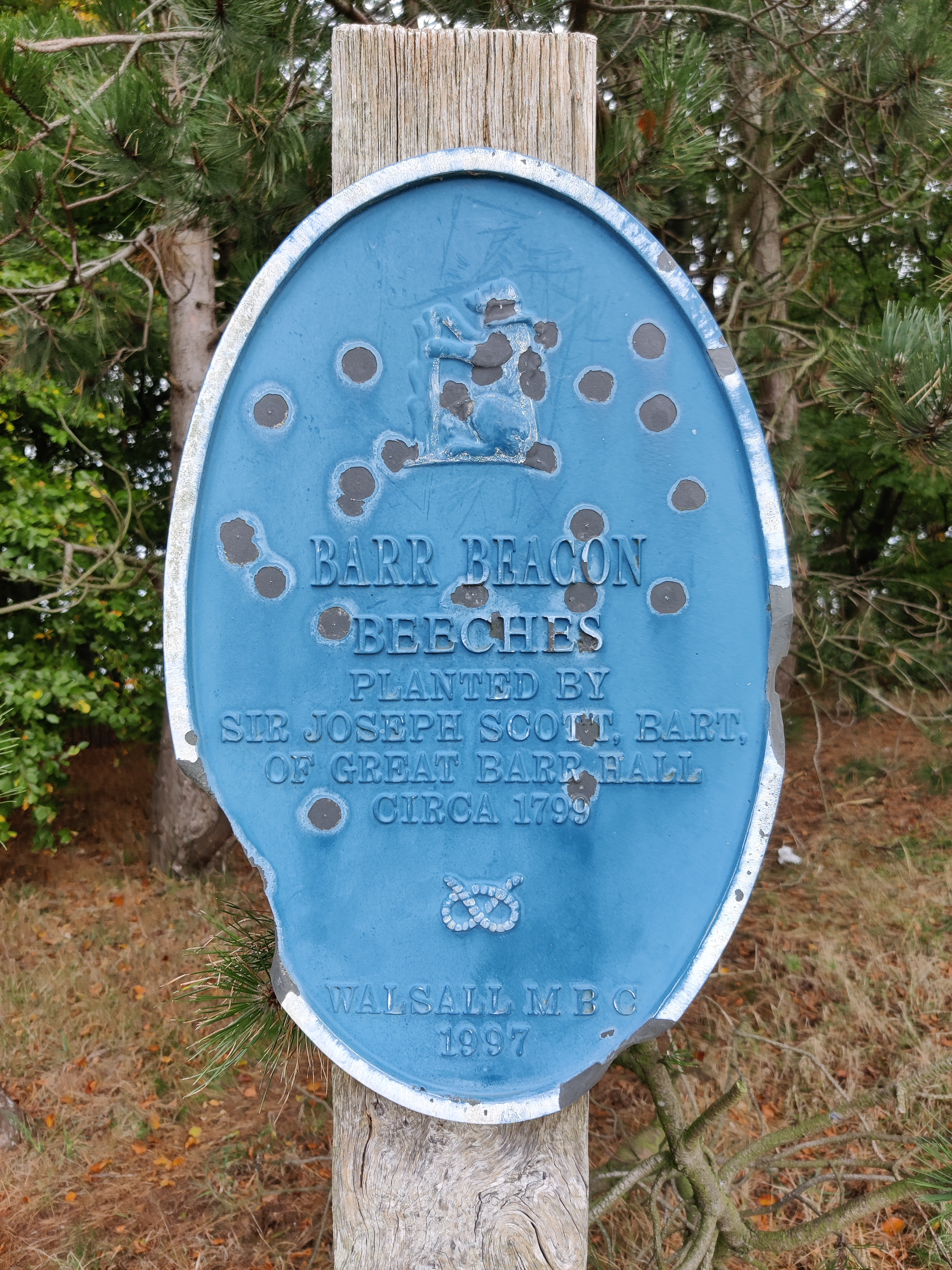
Blue plaque, erected 1997, marking the planting of Beech trees by Scott at Barr Beacon, near Great Barr Hall, circa 1799

In 1799 he served as High Sheriff of Staffordshire and was member of parliament for Worcester in 1802–1806.

On 30 April 1806 he was created 1st Baronet of the Baronetage Scott of Great Barr.

He married Margaret Whitby by whom he had three children, one daughter Mary who died aged 15 and two sons Edward Dolman Scott who succeeded him in 1828, and William Scott who became Vicar of Great Barr.

Parliament of the United Kingdom
Preceded by Edmund Wigley; Abraham Robarts	Member of Parliament for Worcester; 1802–1806; With: Abraham Robarts	Succeeded by Henry Bromley; Abraham Robarts
Baronetage of the United Kingdom
New creation	Baronet (of Great Barr); 1806–1828	Succeeded by Edward Dolman Scott
