= Bateman baronets =

There have been two baronetcies created for members of the Bateman family, one in the Baronetage of England and one in the Baronetage of the United Kingdom. The Batemans had their origins in Norfolk but settled at Hartington, Derbyshire in the 16th century.

- Bateman baronets of How Hall (1664)
- Bateman baronets of Hartington Hall (1806)
