= Bateman baronets of Hartington Hall (1806) =

Escutcheon of the Bateman baronets of Hartington Hall

The Bateman baronetcy, of Hartington in the County of Derby, was created in the Baronetage of the United Kingdom on 13 December 1806 for Hugh Bateman. The Batemans of Hartington Hall were the senior branch of the family; Sir Hugh had no sons, so the baronetcy was created with a special remainder allowing the male heirs of his two daughters to succeed. On 14 February 1815 his elder daughter Catherine Juliana married Edward Scott (later Sir Edward, 2nd Baronet, of Great Barr; see Scott baronets of Great Barr), and on 3 August the same year his younger daughter Amelia Anne married Sir Alexander Hood, 2nd Baronet, of St Audries (see Fuller-Acland-Hood baronets of St Audries).

On Sir Hugh Bateman's death on 28 January 1824 his title passed to his elder daughter's unborn child, born on 25 February the same year with the name Francis Edward Scott; while Hartington Hall passed to his nephew Richard Thomas Bateman, whose descendants occupied the property until the 20th century. On 27 December 1851 Sir Francis Scott also succeeded his father in the Scott Baronetcy of Great Barr, as third Baronet. On the death of the fifth Baronet in 1905 the two titles separated. The Scott baronetcy of Great Barr was inherited by Douglas Edward Scott; while the baronetcy of Hartington was inherited by Sir Alexander Fuller-Acland-Hood, 4th Baronet, of St Audries, who became the fifth Baronet. He was the grandson of Sir Alexander Hood, 2nd Baronet, and his wife Amelia Anne Bateman. See Fuller-Acland-Hood baronets for further history of the title.

The title became extinct on the death without heir of the eighth Baronet in 1990.

== Bateman, later Scott, later Fuller-Acland-Hood, later Hood baronets, of Hartington Hall (1806) ==
- Sir Hugh Bateman, 1st Baronet (1756–1824)
- Sir Francis Edward Scott, 2nd Baronet (1824–1863)
- Sir Edward William Dolman Scott, 3rd Baronet (1854–1871)
- Sir Arthur Douglas Bateman Scott, 4th Baronet (1860–1884)
- Sir Edward Dolman Scott, 5th Baronet (1826–1905)
- Alexander Fuller-Acland-Hood, 1st Baron St Audries, 6th Baronet (1853–1917) (see Fuller-Acland-Hood baronets)
- Alexander Peregrine Fuller-Acland-Hood, 2nd Baron St Audries, 7th Baronet (1893–1971)
- Sir William Acland Hood, 8th Baronet (1901–1990)

== Notes ==
Baronetage of the United Kingdom
| Preceded by Berry baronets | Bateman baronets of Hartington Hall; 13 December 1806 | Succeeded by Sibbald baronets |
