= Sir David Scott, 2nd Baronet =

Scottish Tory politician

- Sir David Scott, 2nd Baronet, 1830s engraving
- Born: 25 July 1782
- Died: 18 June 1851 (aged 68)
- Occupation: Politician
- Children: Sir James Sibbald David Scott, 3rd Baronet
- Parent: David Scott of Dunninald

Sir David Scott, 2nd Baronet, KH (25 July 1782 – 18 June 1851) of Dunninald Castle, Scotland, was a Scottish Tory politician.

== Biography ==
=== Early life ===
David Scott was born on 25 July 1782, the oldest son of David Scott (1746–1805) of Dunninald. He was educated at Eton and matriculated at Trinity College, Cambridge in 1801.

His father was a director the British East India Company, who put an agency for the company in trust for his son, to mature when he was 12. Young David entered that business.

=== Career ===
When his father died in 1805, Scott had expected to succeed him as MP for the Perth Burghs. However, by the time Scott left his father's bedside, Sir David Wedderburn had already secured so much support that even the backing of Lord Melville was unable to prevent defeat.

As consolation for his defeat, it was arranged for him to be elected instead for another seat. He was duly returned at a by-election in January 1806 as the Member of Parliament (MP) for the rotten borough of Yarmouth, Isle of Wight. He held the seat until the general election in November 1806, when he did not stand again.

After his 1805 defeat, Scott sought a baronetcy for his mother's brother-in-law Sir James Sibbald, 1st Baronet of Silwood Park in Berkshire, which was granted in December 1806, with remainder to Scott. When Sir James died without issue in 1819, David inherited the baronetcy and his uncle's estate. He then sold Dunninald to Patrick Arklay MP.

He was a Director of the East India Company from 1814 to 1818.

He was also a Knight of the Hanoverian Guelphic Order.

=== Death ===
He died on 18 June 1851. After his death, he was succeeded by his son, Sir James Sibbald David Scott, 3rd Baronet.

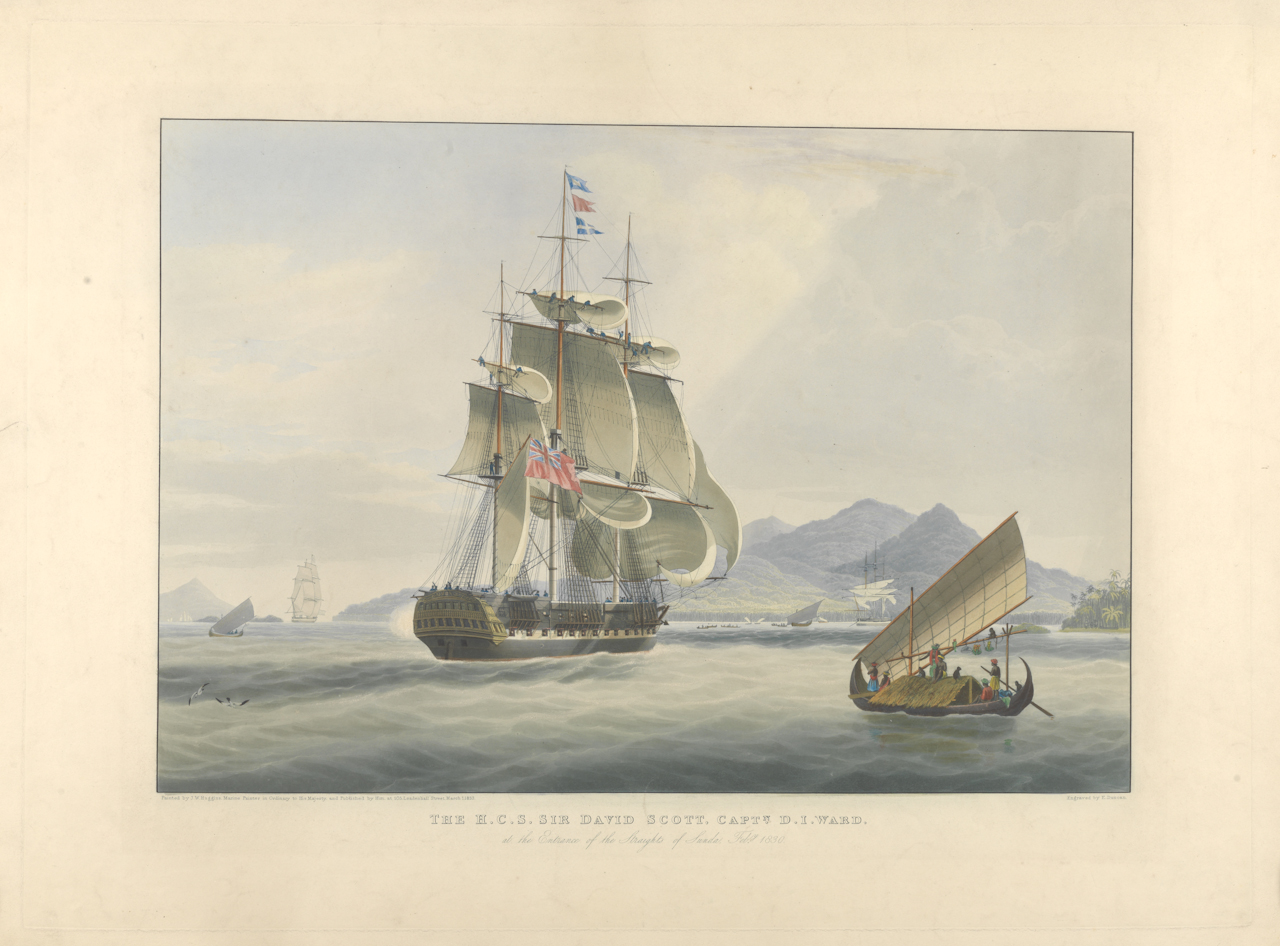
The H.C.S. ship Sir David Scott Captn D.I. Ward, at the Entrance of the Sunda Strait, February 1830

Parliament of the United Kingdom
Preceded by Home Riggs Popham; Jervoise Clarke Jervoise	Member of Parliament for Yarmouth; Jan 1806 – Nov 1806; With: Jervoise Clarke Jervoise	Succeeded by Thomas William Plummer; Jervoise Clarke Jervoise
Baronetage of the United Kingdom
Preceded by James Sibbald Scott	Baronet (of Dunninald); 1819 – 1851	Succeeded by James Sibbald David Scott
