= Sir James Sibbald David Scott, 3rd Baronet =

Scottish antiquarian and army officer

Sir James Sibbald David Scott, 3rd Baronet (1814–1885) of Dunninald Castle, Forfarshire, was a Scottish antiquarian and army officer.

== Life ==
Born on 14 June 1814, he was the eldest son of Sir David Scott, 2nd Baronet of Egham; his mother was Caroline, daughter of Benjamin Grindall. He graduated B.A. in 1835 from Christ Church, Oxford, and was a captain in the Royal Sussex Light Infantry Militia and its offshoot, the Royal Sussex Militia Artillery, from 21 April 1846 to 22 January 1856. He succeeded to the baronetcy in 1851, and was J.P. and D.L. for Sussex and Middlesex. He was a fellow of the Society of Antiquaries of London, and a member of the Royal Archæological Institute.

Scott died on 28 June 1885 at Upper Norwood.

== Works ==
Scott's major work was The British Army: its Origin, Progress, and Equipment, illustrated. The first two volumes were published in 1868, and a third volume in 1880, bringing down the record from the 1660 to 1688. He contributed to the journal of the Royal Archæological Institute.

In the summer of 1874 Scott paid a short visit to Jamaica, and his diary was published in 1876 under the title To Jamaica and Back. It contains a sketch of the military and naval history of the island, and describes in some detail the Morant Bay rebellion of 1865.

== Family ==
Scott married Harriet Anne Shank on 28 November 1844. They had three sons and four daughters.

== Notes ==
Attribution

This article incorporates text from a publication now in the public domain: Lee, Sidney, ed. (1897). "Scott, James Sibbald David". Dictionary of National Biography. Vol. 51. London: Smith, Elder & Co.

Baronetage of the United Kingdom
Preceded by David Scott	Baronet (of Dunninald); 1851–1885	Succeeded by Francis Sibbald Scott
