= Esmé Cecil Wingfield-Stratford =

English historian and writer

Esmé Cecil Wingfield-Stratford (20 September 1882 – 20 February 1971) was an English historian, writer, mind-trainer, outdoorsman, patriot and ruralist.

== Life ==
Wingfield-Stratford was born in 1882, the elder son of Brigadier-General Cecil Wingfield-Stratford (a descendant of the ancient Stratford Family) and his wife, Rosalind Isabel, daughter of the Revd Hon. Edward Vesey Bligh and Lady Isabel Bligh. Unhappy at Eton College (1893–1900), it was at King's College, Cambridge where he really developed, matriculating in 1900. This was followed by a research studentship at the London School of Economics. His work at the LSE on what became the first volume of his History of British Patriotism (1913) led to his election in 1907 to a fellowship at King's College, Cambridge, which he retained until 1913. In the same year he was awarded the degree of DScEcon by the University of London.

After war service in India, Wingfield-Stratford sought no further academic advancement. With an independent income, he was a historian and author, dividing his time between his rural home at Berkhamsted and London. He also travelled abroad. He married Barbara Elizabeth Errington on 30 December 1915 (daughter of Lieutenant-Colonel H. L. Errington and the Hon. Mrs Errington), and on 9 November 1916 had a daughter, Roshnara Barbara Wingfield-Stratford.

== Work ==
Wingfield-Stratford's first substantial work was The History of English Patriotism (2 vols., 1913), a theme to which he several times returned. The most lasting of his books remains The History of British Civilization (2 vols., 1928) which stands comparison with the better-known one-volume histories of England by G. M. Trevelyan and Keith Feiling. Trevelyan (thanked in the preface along with Eileen Power) was one of a number of professional historians, which also included R. H. Tawney and John and Barbara Hammond, who were his neighbours in the country and provided companions for long walks during which historical issues provided the staple of conversation. Whether writing of the seventeenth or the nineteenth centuries or the Middle Ages, Wingfield-Stratford treated figures of the past as though he had known them individually. His particular approach to history treated the real-world, physical evidence of landscape and buildings as no less significant than archives and literature. When he published his last book, Beyond Empire, in 1964 he could point to about forty volumes bearing his name, including—besides histories—polemical works, fiction, and poetry. Routledge was his chief publisher.

== Character ==
Wingfield-Stratford had a larger-than-life, eccentric personality. Nostalgic for his own Merry England, his "aggressiveness of temper and the somewhat rhetorical extravagance of mind" was mentioned in his obituary in The Times.

== Death ==
Wingfield-Stratford died of heart failure on 20 February 1971 at his home in Berkhamsted, Hertfordshire at the age of 89. He was survived by his wife and their daughter, Roshnara Barbara Wingfield-Stratford.

== Selected books ==
- The Call of Dawn, and other poems by Esmé Cecil Wingfield Stratford (1909)
- An Appeal to the British People by Esmé Cecil Wingfield Stratford (1914)
- India, etc. by Esmé Cecil Wingfield Stratford (1920)
- The Reconstruction of Mind. An open way of mind-training by Esmé Cecil Wingfield Stratford (1921)
- Life: being a memoir of Chesney Temple by Robert V. Allenby. A novel by Esmé Cecil Wingfield Stratford (1923)
- Parent or Pedagogue, etc. by Esmé Cecil Wingfield Stratford (1924)
- The Grand Young Man by Esmé Cecil Wingfield Stratford (1926)
- Until it doth run over by Esmé Cecil Wingfield Stratford (1927)
- " The History of British Civilization" by Esmé Wingfield Stratford (2 vol 1929)
- New Minds for Old. The art and science of mind-training by Esmé Cecil Wingfield Stratford (1934)
- The Harvest of Victory, 1918-1926 ... With 5 maps by Esmé Cecil Wingfield Stratford (1935)
- Good Talk. A study of the art of conversation by Esmé Cecil Wingfield Stratford (1936)
- King Charles and the Conspirators. With portraits by Esmé Cecil Wingfield Stratford and Charles I (1937)
- Churchill. The making of a hero by Esmé Cecil Wingfield Stratford and Winston Churchill (1942)
- Before the Lamps Went Out. Autobiographical reminiscences. With a portrait by Esmé Cecil Wingfield Stratford (1945)
- Charles, King of England, 1600-1637. With plates, including portraits by Esmé Cecil Wingfield Stratford and Charles I (1949)
- King Charles and King Pym, 1637-1643. With portraits by Esmé Cecil Wingfield Stratford, John Pym and Charles I (1949)
- This was a Man. The biography of the Honourable Edward Vesey Bligh, etc. With plates, including portraits by Esmé Cecil Wingfield Stratford and Edward Vesey Bligh (1949)
- King Charles the Martyr, 1643-1649. With plates, including portraits by Esmé Cecil Wingfield Stratford and Charles I (1950)
- Truth in Masquerade. A study of fashions in fact. With plates by Esmé Cecil Wingfield Stratford (1951)
- The Unfolding Pattern of British Life. The growth of a new world order by Esmé Cecil Wingfield Stratford (1953)
- The Lords of Cobham Hall. On the Bligh family. With plates by Esmé Cecil Wingfield Stratford (1959)
