= North Midland Divisional Engineers =

North Midland Divisional Engineers 46th (North Midland) Divisional Engineers 59th (2nd North Midland) Divisional Engineers
- Active: 1908–2014
- Country: United Kingdom
- Branch: Territorial Army
- Type: Field Engineer
- Role: Divisional Engineers; Corps Troops
- Part of: 46th (North Midland) Division; 59th (2nd North Midland) Division; 75 Engineer Regiment
- Engagements: World War I: Hohenzollern Redoubt; Gommecourt; Ypres; Cambrai; German spring offensive; Hundred Days Offensive; St Quentin Canal; World War II: Battle of France; Greece; Tunisia; Italy; Normandy; Operation Plunder

Commanders
- Notable commanders: Lt-Col W.E. Harrison; Brig-Gen Cecil Wingfield-Stratford; Lt-Col Henry Morshead

The North Midland Divisional Engineers was a Territorial Force unit of the British Royal Engineers created in 1908 by conversion of a volunteer infantry battalion from Staffordshire. It saw action in World War I at the Hohenzollern Redoubt, Gommecourt, Ypres, Cambrai, the German spring offensive and the Hundred Days Offensive, culminating in the assault crossings of the St Quentin Canal, the Selle and the Sambre. During World War II its component units saw action in the Battle of France, in Greece, Tunisia, Italy, Normandy and the Rhine crossing.

== Early history ==
The origin of the unit lay in the 1st Staffordshire Rifle Volunteer Corps, one of many such RVCs raised after an invasion scare in 1859. It was organised at Handsworth on 15 August 1859. The 1st Handsworth was raised by James Timmins Chance JP, the first in the county, the first in the Midlands and possibly the first in Great Britain following the letter from Jonathan Peel, Secretary of State for War, to county Lord Lieutenants on 12 May 1859. JT Chance wrote to Lord Hatherton, Lord Lieutenant of Staffordshire in July 1859 to tell him he had raised a company of fifty volunteers.

Sir Francis Scott, 3rd Baronet, was one of the original officers. From July 1860, along with a number of other units from the county, it formed part of the 3rd Administrative Battalion of Staffordshire RVCs (dates are those of the first officers' commissions):

- 1st (Handsworth) Staffordshire RVC
- 15th (Brierley Hill) Staffordshire RVC, formed at Brierley Hill 1 August 1860
- 17th (Seisdon) Staffordshire RVC, formed at Seisdon 21 February 1860, became No 2 Company of 27th Staffordshire RVC in 1873
- 18th (Kingswinford) Staffordshire RVC, formed at Kingswinford 21 February 1860
- 20th (West Bromwich) Staffordshire RVC, formed at West Bromwich 25 February 1860
- 27th (Patshull) Staffordshire RVC, formed at Patshull on 7 March 1860 under the command of William Legge, 5th Earl of Dartmouth
- 31st (Smethwick) Staffordshire RVC, formed at Smethwick on 19 April 1860
- 35th (Kinver) Staffordshire RVC, formed at Kinver on 3 July 1860.

In 1880, the RVCs were consolidated, and the 3rd Admin Bn became the 1st Staffordshire RVC with the following organisation:

- A & B Companies at Handsworth (ex 1st Staffs RVC)
- C Company at Brierley Hill (ex 15th Staffs RVC)
- D Company at Kingswinford, later at Wordsley (ex 18th Staffs RVC)
- E Company at West Bromwich (ex 20th Staffs RVC)
- F Company at Seisdon (ex No 2 Company, 27th Staffs RVC)
- G Company at Patshull (ex No 1 Company, 27th Staffs RVC)
- H Company at Smethwick (ex 31st Staffs RVC)

As part of the Childers Reforms, the RVCs were affiliated to their local Regular regiments, and in May 1883 the 1st Staffs RVC became the 1st Volunteer Battalion, South Staffordshire Regiment, with its headquarters at Belgrave Terrace, Handsworth. In the 1880s, the battalion formed a mounted infantry company, but it soon disappeared. Additional companies were formed later: I Company at Smethwick and K Company at West Bromwich (both 1900), and L (Cyclist) Company at Handsworth (1901). A later reorganisation saw the disbandment of G Company and consolidation at Handsworth (3 Cos), Brierley Hill (2 Cos), West Bromwich (2 Cos), Smethwick (2 Cos) and Sutton Coldfield (1 Co). From 1888, the battalion, along with the other South Staffordshire and North Staffordshire Regiment Volunteer Battalions, formed part of the Staffordshire Brigade.

== Territorial Force ==
When the former Volunteer Force was subsumed into the Territorial Force in 1908, some of the existing Volunteer infantry units were converted to artillery and engineers to complete the new divisional structures. The 1st VB of the South Staffordshires was one such, the bulk being converted into the 1st North Midland Field Company, Royal Engineers, in the North Midland Division, while some of the personnel from Handsworth and Brierley Hill became G and E Companies in the new 5th Bn South Staffordshires, which was mainly drawn from the 2nd VB.

The 1st North Midland Field Company was based at the Drill Hall in Broomfield Road, Smethwick, while the HQ of the Divisional Engineers and the newly raised 2nd North Midland Field Company was at Norton Hall in Norton Canes, near Cannock, the family home of Lt-Col W.E. Harrison, whose coal mining employees formed the bulk of the personnel. Harrison was appointed Commanding Royal Engineer (CRE) of the North Midland Division on 25 May 1912. The newly formed Divisional Telegraph (later Signal) Company, RE, was based at the Drill Hall at Routh Street in Stoke-on-Trent.

== World War I ==
=== Mobilisation ===
The order to mobilise was received on 4 August 1914. Shortly afterwards, the men were invited to volunteer for overseas service, and the majority having accepted this liability, the North Midland Division concentrated at Luton. In November it moved to the area round Bishop's Stortford where it completed its war training.

Meanwhile, the men who had not volunteered for foreign service, together with the recruits who were coming forward, remained at the drill halls to form 2nd Line units designated the 2/1st and 2/2nd North Midland Field Companies, while the parent units took a '1/' prefix. Later, the 1/3rd and 3/1st Field Companies were formed. The 2nd Line units joined the 2nd North Midland Division.

=== 28th Division ===
The first unit of the North Midland engineers to go overseas was the 1/1st NM Field Company, which was posted to the 28th Division, formed of Regular Army battalions brought back from India and other imperial postings. The company joined the division assembling at Winchester on 26 December 1914, and landed with it in France on 19 January 1915. It went into the line soon afterwards, but had returned to its parent division before the 28th was involved in any serious fighting.

=== 46th (North Midland) Division ===
The advance parties of the North Midland Division arrived in France on 23 February 1915, and by 8 March the bulk of the division had completed its concentration, becoming the first complete TF division to serve in an active theatre of war. 1/1st NM Field Company returned to the division on 6 April, and because the RE establishment had been increased to three field companies per division, the experienced 57th Field Company (from the Regular Army 3rd Division) was attached from 7 April to 10 July 1915, when 2/1st North Midland Field Company arrived from England. The division was officially designated 46th (North Midland) Division on 12 May 1915.

==== Hohenzollern Redoubt ====
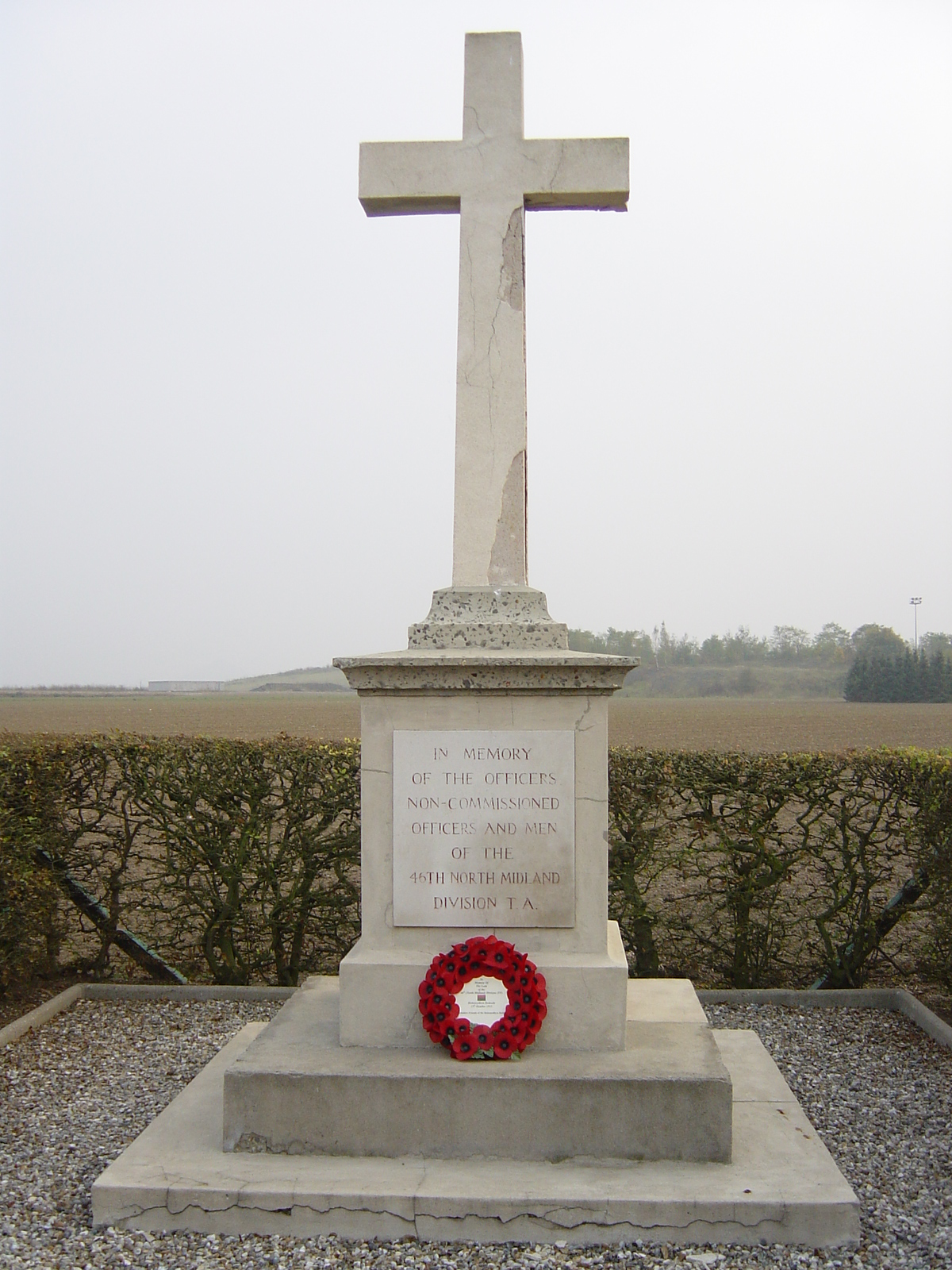
46th Division memorial at Vermelles, starting point for the division's attack on 13 October 1915

46th Division's first offensive operation was the Battle of the Hohenzollern Redoubt. This was an attempt to restart the failed Battle of Loos, and the division was moved down from Ypres on 1 October for the purpose. The Germans had recaptured the Hohenzollern trench system on 3 October, and the new attack was aimed at this point. The infantry went in at 14.00 on 13 October behind a gas cloud, 1/1st NM Fd Co supporting 138th (Lincoln and Leicester) Brigade in the Left Attack, and 1/2nd NM Fd Co supporting 137th (Staffordshire Brigade) in the Right Attack, with one section of 1/2nd following the third line of each attack. The assault was a disaster, most of the leading waves being cut down by machine gun and shellfire.

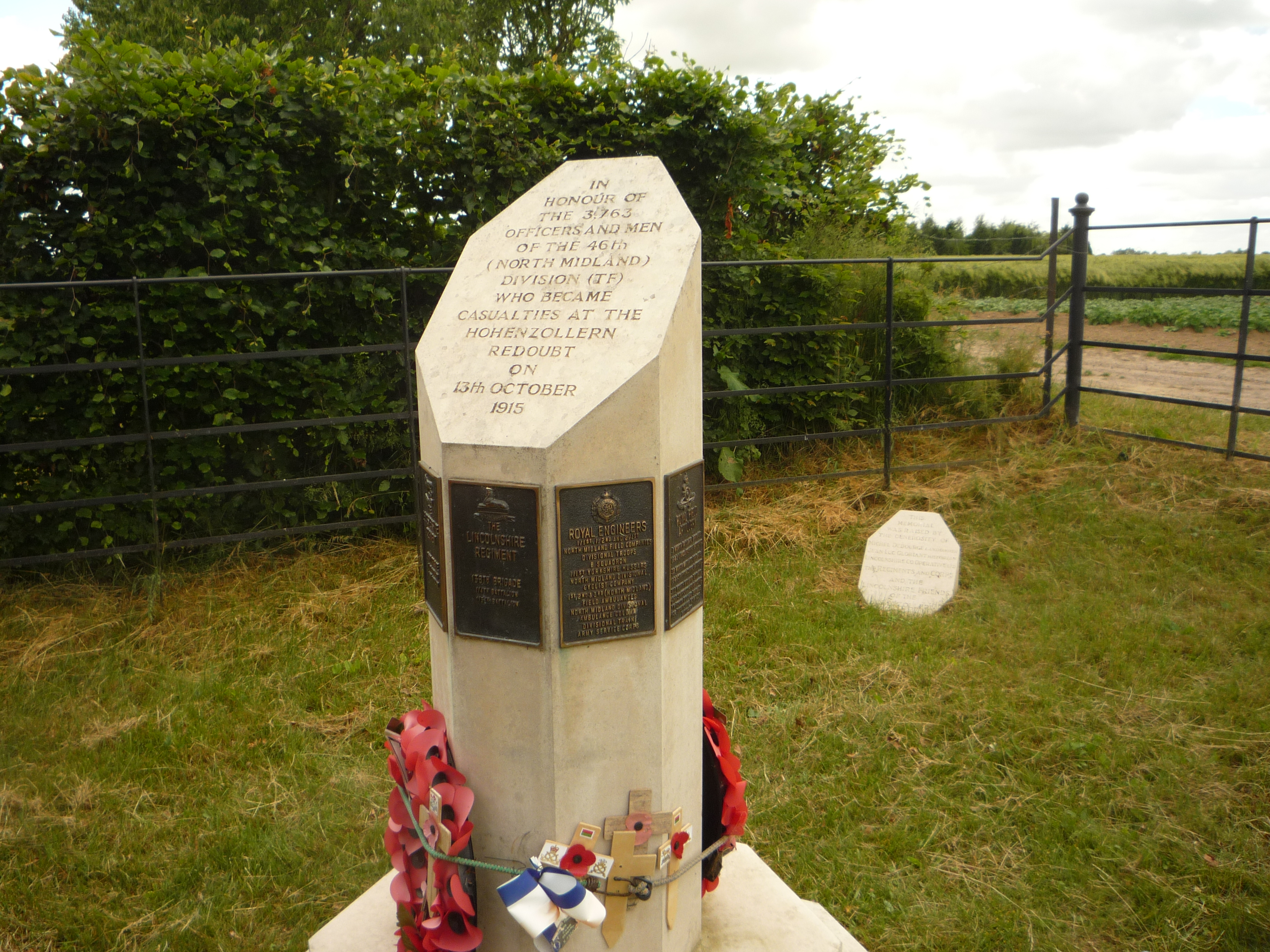
46th (North Midland) Division's memorial at Cité de Madagascar, site of the Hohenzollern Redoubt. The nearest bronze plate lists the Divisional Engineers and other support troops.

In December 1915, the division was ordered to Egypt, and most of it (with two of the field companies) arrived there by 13 January. A week later the move was countermanded and the troops re-embarked for France, concentrating near Amiens by mid-February. The only result of this move was an outbreak of infectious disease (Paratyphoid fever and Diphtheria) that weakened units and men for months to come.

==== Gommecourt ====
For the Battle of the Somme, 46th Division was tasked with making a diversionary attack on the north flank of the Gommecourt Salient. It was moved into the area in early May 1916, and the engineers were worked hard to improve the positions and then prepare for the assault against strong German defences.

As before, each assaulting brigade was assigned a full field company in support, 1/2nd and 2/1st to 137th Bde and 139th (Sherwood Forester) Brigade respectively. The 2/1st Fd Co allocated one party of sappers to 1/6th Bn Sherwood Foresters and three parties to the 1/7th (Robin Hood) Bn. The latter were to construct strongpoints in the captured German defences, while the party with 1/6th Bn was to stay in the German front line trench doing whatever work was required. In addition, small demolition parties were to advance with the Sherwood Foresters' bombing teams. The 1/2nd Fd Co was instructed to follow the final carrying parties of the supporting 1/5th Bn Leicestershire Regiment across No-Man's Land, and was thus less heavily engaged. No 2 Company, 5th Bn Special Brigade, RE, was also assigned to 46th Divisional RE to provide a smoke screen using trench mortars. The work was to be coordinated from a temporary RE HQ in a cellar in Fonquevillers.

Once again, the infantry attack was a disaster. 1/2nd Fd Co reported 2 killed and 14 wounded, 2/1st Fd Co lost 5 killed, 11 wounded and 7 missing.

In early 1917, the RE TF companies were numbered, those of 46th Division becoming:

- 465th (1st North Midland) Field Company, RE
- 466th (2nd North Midland) Field Company, RE
- 468th (2/1st North Midland) Field Company, RE

==== Hill 70 ====
Between April and June 1917, the 46th Division was involved in back-and-forth attacks and counter-attacks around Hill 70 in the mining area of Lens. For example, before an attack by 137th and 138th Bdes on 8 June, 466th Fd Co under Maj Coussmaker had two days to cut assembly trenches through the houses of Riamont, and open up communication trenches. A few minutes after Zero Hour, a 'battalion' of dummies was erected under orders of the CRE to attract enemy fire. After the attack, RE parties moved up into the captured positions to make shelters and erect wire during the night.

For the attack of 28 June, the CRE had '2nd Cavalry Brigade Pioneer Battalion' (comprising a dismounted squadron from each regiment of the 2nd Cavalry Brigade), the South Irish Horse and Corps Cyclists to assist the RE and divisional pioneers in digging new assembly trenches (two of which were named 'Cavalry' and 'Cyclist').

Although the raids and attacks were only partially successful, when the division was withdrawn from the Lens area in early July it had prepared the jumping-off points from which the Canadians successfully captured Hill 70 on 16–17 August.

==== Battle of St. Quentin Canal ====
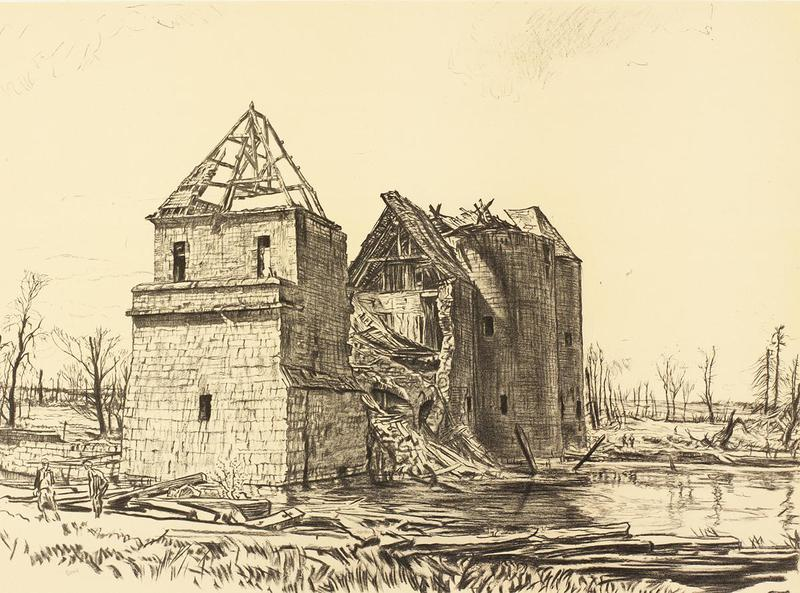
The Chateau near Brie on the Somme, where rehearsals for the St Quentin Canal crossing were held (Drawing by Muirhead Bone)

In September 1918, the 46th Division was given the task of crossing the steeply-banked and formidably defended St Quentin Canal, part of the Hindenburg Line. The engineers would play a critical role, but the divisional CRE, Lt-Col Morshead, was wounded while carrying out a reconnaissance. Preparations included collecting material for crossing the canal, ranging from bridging equipment, rafts and scaling-ladders to 'mud mats' and lifebelts taken from cross-Channel ferries. A rehearsal was held on the moat at Brie Chateau.

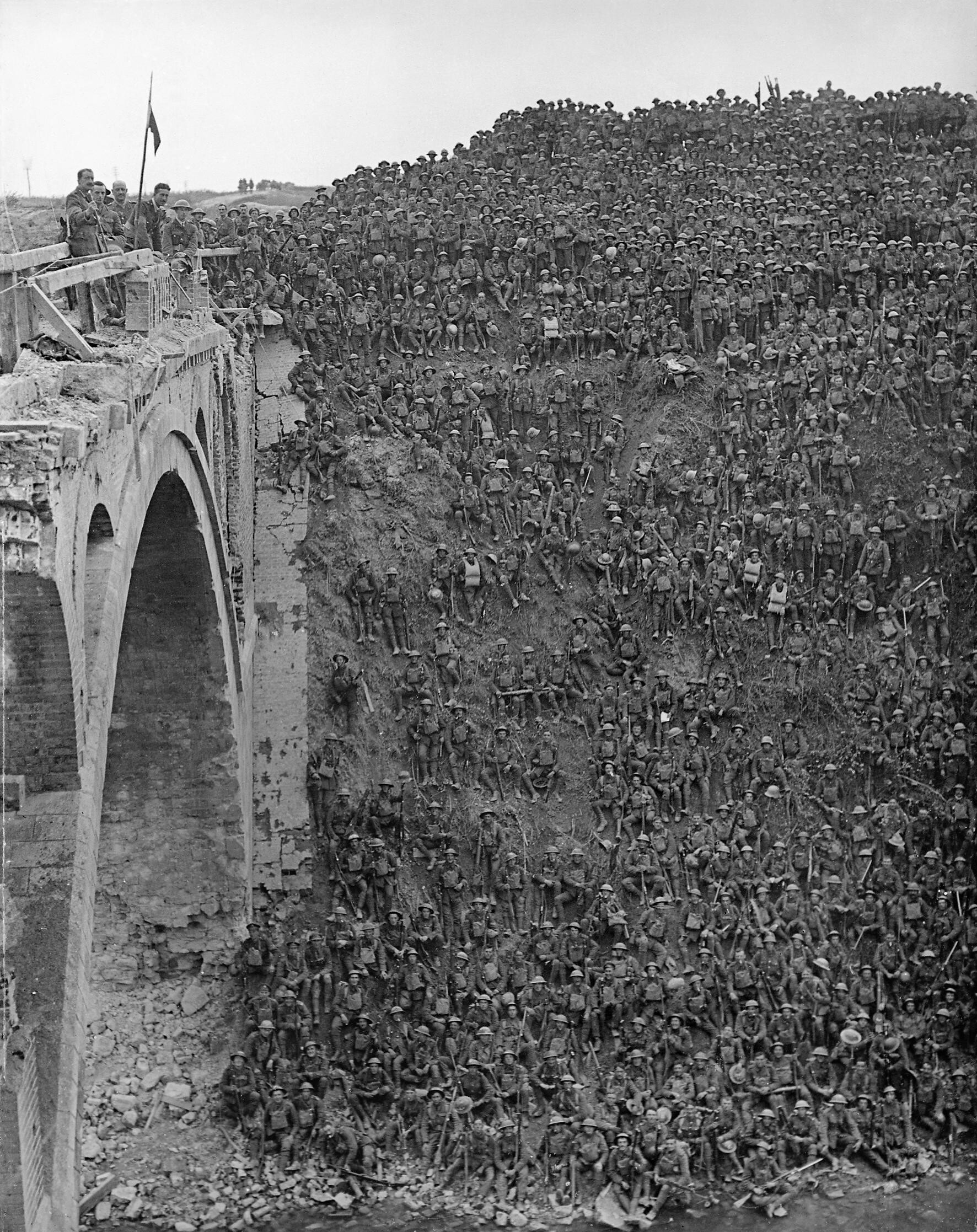
Brigadier General J V Campbell addressing troops of the Staffordshire Brigade from Riqueval Bridge after its capture

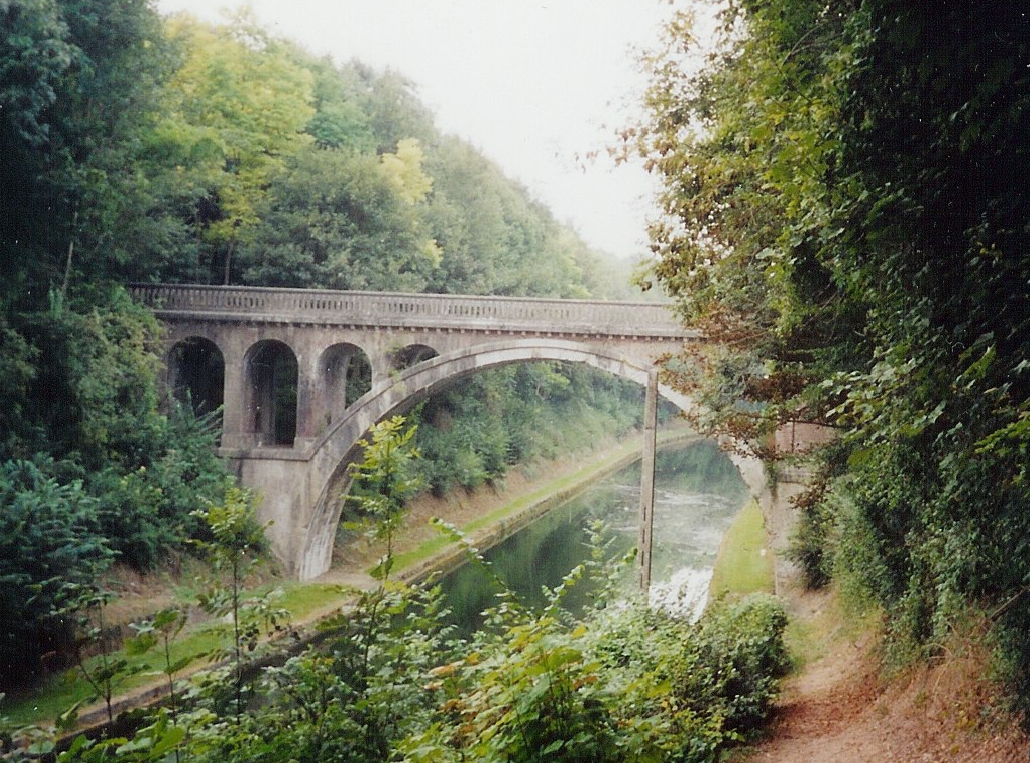
Riqueval Bridge in 2003. The canal banks are much more overgrown than when the bridge was captured during the battle

On the night of 28/29 September, the engineers laid out the forming-up tapes for the assaulting troops, and at 05.50 in the morning, the Staffordshire Brigade of 46th Division stormed the canal behind a rapid creeping barrage, under a Smoke screen thickened by morning fog. Captain A.H. Charlton and a party of 1/6th Bn North Staffordshire Regiment seized the single remaining road bridge over the canal at Riqueval before the Germans could destroy it, and 466th Fd Co immediately set about repairing it for guns and road traffic. The company also seized other bridges and converted dams to bridges. Other engineer sections were assigned to mopping-up parties, to examine dugouts and strongpoints for demolition charges and booby-traps. This was especially so in the Bellenglise Tunnel, where a mine was disarmed and the electric light plant restored. The follow-up waves found direction-keeping difficult in the smoke screen and fog, and engineer officers at the canal bridges had to point them in the right direction. In the aftermath of the battle, the Divisional Signal Company established a Forward Report Centre in abandoned German dugouts.

==== Battle of the Selle ====
Once the Hindenburg Line had been breached, the advance moved into less devastated areas where civilians were present, and when the divisional engineers were out of the line they helped to repair civilian homes. In the advance, they were rebuilding railway bridges, filling cratered roads and dealing with delayed-action mines. During the Battle of the Selle (17 October), the Staffordshire Bde put in a mock attack using dummy troops and tanks operated by the engineers. When there was confusion in 139th Bde's attack, Lt M.E. Thomas of 465th Fd Co, gathered a group of men of various units and led them up with his sappers to assist, where he took command of the flank infantry company. The engineers then built a strongpoint for the most advanced troops.

==== Battle of the Sambre ====
The BEF paused before attacking the Sambre–Oise Canal. On 5 November, 46th Division renewed the advance, the divisional engineers throwing a pontoon bridge across the canal for the artillery and transport to cross. The approaches to this bridge soon became a sea of mud, and 465th Fd Co built a Corduroy road across the fields. The heavy rain made the Petite Helpe stream impassable, but on 7 November, 468th Fd Co threw three bridges across it before the end of the day, and 465th Fd Co was brought up from crater-filling to build a motor bridge, which was completed before dark on 9 November. Meanwhile, on 8 November, 466th Fd Co commenced a bridge at Cartignies for 60-pounder guns, which were urgently needed in the pursuit of the beaten enemy. The signal company, too, was heavily involved in maintaining communications, a detachment advancing ahead of the leading brigade headquarters to prepare cables for its arrival (often re-using stretches of captured German systems). Wireless sets were also leap-frogged forwards.

46th Division met its last organised opposition on 8 November, and was resting when the Armistice with Germany came into force on 11 November. On 14–15 November, the division moved into billets around Landrecies and began salvage and repair work. In January, it moved to Le Cateau and here demobilisation began. The final cadres left in June 1919.

==== Commanders ====
The Commanding Royal Engineers (CREs) of 46th Division during the war were:

- Lt-Col W.E. Harrison, appointed 25 May 1912, invalided 19 October 1914
- Brig-Gen Cecil Wingfield-Stratford, appointed 19 October 1914
- Lt-Col E.J. Walthew, appointed 2 May 1918, killed 22 May 1918
- Maj W.D. Zeller, acting from 22 May to 1 June 1918
- Lt-Col Henry Morshead, appointed 1 June, wounded 25 September, temporary 27 September, returned to duty 10 November 1918
- Capt H.J.C. Marshall, acting 25 September 1918
- Maj W.H. Hardman, acting 25–27 September 1918
- Lt-Col W. Garforth, appointed 28 September, to 10 November 1918

=== 59th (2nd North Midland) Division ===
At first, the 2nd Line recruits had to parade in civilian clothes until uniforms arrived in November 1914. Training was undertaken by men of the 1st Line who had not volunteered for, or were unfit for overseas service. 2nd North Midland Division (59th (2nd North Midland) Division from August 1915), concentrated round its war station at Luton in January 1915, moving to St Albans in July. After the Easter Rising in April 1916, the division was sent to Ireland. Once the trouble in Dublin had been suppressed, the troops moved out to The Curragh to continue training. 59th Division was relieved in Ireland in January 1917, and returned to the UK, concentrating at the Fovant training area on the edge of Salisbury Plain preparatory to embarking for France.

Before it embarked, the TF field companies were numbered in February 1917, the 59th's becoming:

- 467th (1/3rd North Midland) Field Company, RE
- 469th (2/2nd North Midland) Field Company, RE
- 470th (3/1st North Midland) Field Company, RE

The division completed its concentration around Méricourt in France by 3 March 1917.

==== 3rd Ypres ====
The 59th Division took part in following the German Retreat to the Hindenburg Line in March and April, but it was not until September that it was engaged in its first full-scale actions, the phases of the 3rd Ypres Offensive known as the Battle of the Menin Road Ridge (23 September) and the Battle of Polygon Wood (26 September).

==== Bourlon Wood ====
59th Division was next moved south to join in the Battle of Cambrai. The division entered the recently captured line between Cantaing and Bourlon Wood on 28 November. Fierce German counter-attacks began on 30 Novemberand by 4 December the decision had been made to withdraw from the Bourlon Salient. 59th Division held covering positions while this was carried out. On 7 December, the British were back on the line that they would hold for the coming winter.

==== Spring Offensive ====
When the German spring offensive began on 21 March 1918 (the Battle of St Quentin), 59th Division was holding the Bullecourt Salient, squarely in the path of the German thrust. The situation soon became desperate, the forward brigades were almost totally destroyed, and the reserves moving up were swamped. The line was only held by the rear details.

==== Reconstruction ====
59th Division was back in the line on 14 April, when it was again in the path of a German offensive (the Battle of Bailleul) and remnants took part in the 1st Battle of Kemmel Ridge (17–18 April). By now, 59th Division's infantry had been almost destroyed. The units were reduced to training cadres and the division was later reconstructed with garrison battalions. Until June, it was employed in digging rear defences, then it underwent training to enable it to hold a sector of the front line. On 25 July, the reconstructed division went back into the line, and on 21 August it once more took part in active operations.

From 2 October until 11 November 1918, the division participated in the final advance in Artois and Flanders. On 2 October, 59th Division carried out two minor operations, which determined that the enemy had retired, and so the division advanced against little opposition. On 16 October the division fought its way through the old defences of Lille, and liberated the city against minimal opposition the following day. Opposition stiffened as the River Schelde was approached, but this was crossed in early November.

The Armistice on 11 November found the division astride the Schelde north of Tournai. It moved to the coast to operate demobilisation centres at Dieppe, Dunkirk and Calais in early 1919, and to train drafts for continued service in Egypt and the Black Sea. 59th Division was finally demobilised during September 1919.

==== Commanders ====
The Commanding Royal Engineers (CREs) of 59th Division during the war were:

- Maj G.B. Roberts, acting, on formation, then as Lt-Col from 13 March 1916 to 4 February 1918
- Lt-Col W.E. Harrison (see above), appointed 21 April 1915, until 13 March 1916
- Lt-Col A.C. Howard, appointed 4 February, until 6 June 1918
- Maj H.A.S. Pressey, acting 6–13 June 1918
- Lt-Col L.J. Coussmaker, appointed 13 June 1918

== Interwar ==
When the TF was reconstituted as the Territorial Army (TA) in 1920, the unit reformed as:

46th (North Midland) Divisional Engineers

- HQ at Smethwick
- 212th (North Midland) Field Company at Smethwick
- 213th (North Midland) Field Company at Cannock
- 214th (North Midland) Field Company at Tunstall
- 215th (North Midland) Field Park Company at Smethwick, absorbed into HQ Divisional RE in 1924, reformed 1939

Lieutenant-Colonel Coussmaker remained in command as CRE. All divisional signals companies were transferred to the newly raised Royal Corps of Signals.

In 1936, the 46th (North Midland) Division was disbanded, its HQ becoming 2nd Anti-Aircraft Division and a number of its infantry battalions converting to the anti-aircraft role. However, the artillery and engineers were retained, the divisional engineers becoming 46th (North Midland) Corps Troops Royal Engineers (CTRE) and the field companies were retitled Army Field Companies. After the Munich Crisis of 1938, the War Office doubled the size of the TA, and 46th CTRE and its component companies raised 2nd Line duplicates, which were dispersed between the two headquarters:

46th (North Staffordshire) Corps Troops Royal Engineers

- 213th (North Midland) Army Field Company, RE
- 214th (North Midland) Army Field Company, RE
- 292nd Army Field Company, RE
- 293rd Corps Field Park Company, RE

46th (South Staffordshire) Corps Troops Royal Engineers

- 212th (North Midland) Army Field Company, RE
- 290th Army Field Company, RE
- 291st Army Field Company, RE
- 215th Corps Field Park Company, RE

== World War II ==
When the TA was embodied in September 1939 at the outbreak of World War II, the companies were dispersed, and the two 46th CTRE HQs disappeared, though it is probable that the North Staffordshire unit (with 213th, 214th and 293rd Cos) became III Corps Troops, Royal Engineers (III CTRE) attached to III Corps when it formed in France as part of the British Expeditionary Force (BEF) in April 1940.

=== 212th (North Midland) Army Field Company ===
The company was mobilised at Smethwick and (redesignated as an Army Troops Company) went to France to work on the BEF's lines of communication. After the Dunkirk evacuation, it joined the Orkney and Shetland Defences (OSDEF) in September 1940 and returned to Western Command in England in December 1941. Retitled as a Field Company, it went to North Africa with First Army in November 1942, and later served in the Italian Campaign.

=== 213th (North Midland) Army Field Company ===
The company was mobilised at Cannock and joined III CTRE in France in April 1940. In May it was detached to 51st (Highland) Division and Arkforce during the Battle of France. The force's engineers blew up the bridges over the River Bresle to slow the German advance, as well as fighting as infantry. The officer commanding 213th Field Company and part of one section were captured with the bulk of 51st Division, but the rest was evacuated from Le Havre in June in Operation Cycle. The company was then assigned to I Corps in Home Defence. In July 1943, it was sent to Italy, where it served under 14th GHQ Troops, RE.

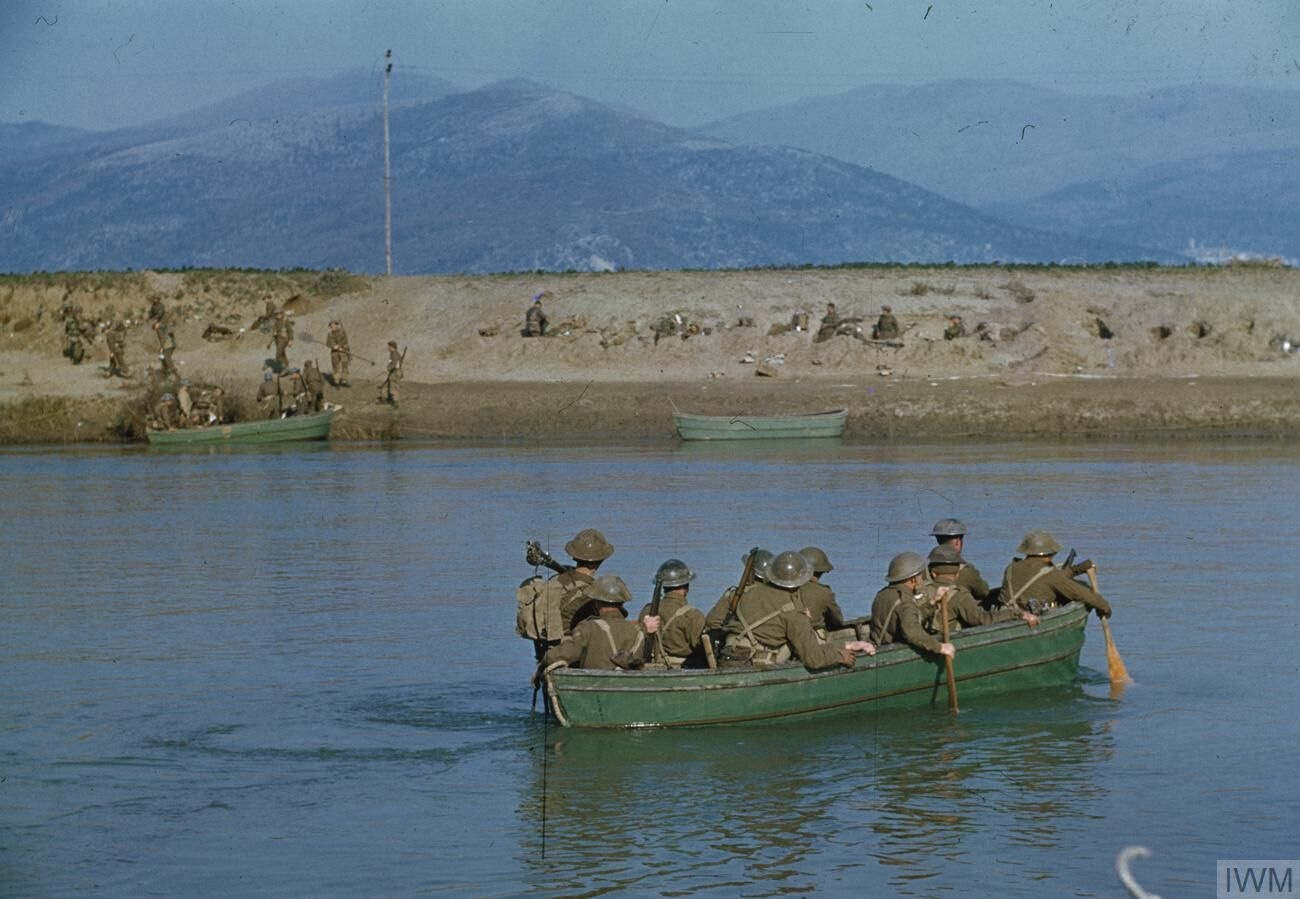
Royal Engineers crossing the River Garigliano, 19 January 1944

The company was engaged at the Crossing of the River Volturno (12 October 1943), when it was one of the few RE units present that was trained to use the Bailey bridge. At the Crossing of the River Garigliano (17–21 January 1944) the company was attached to 5th Division. The river crossing was extremely difficult: 213th Fd Co succeeded in getting the first Folding Boat Equipment (FBE) bridge across during the night of 18/19 January, but it was soon put out of action for nine hours until it could be repaired.

213th Field Company was then returned to England, where it joined 18th (1st London) GHQTRE in 21st Army Group for the invasion of Normandy (Operation Overlord). In early July, the unit was involved in improving the bridges over the River Orne in preparation for Operation Goodwood. At the crossing of the Rhine (Operation Plunder), 18th GHQTRE was assigned the task of building a Class 9 FBE bridge codenamed 'Waterloo'. Work started at 09.30 on 25 March 1945, with 213th Field Company working on the eastern (German) side of the river, and the bridge was open for traffic by midnight.

=== 214th (North Midland) Army Field Company ===
The company was mobilised at Tunstall and went to France with III CTRE, remaining with that formation in Home Defence after Dunkirk. III CTRE was dispersed in April 1941. On 11 April 1942, 214th Fd Co dropped the 'Army' designation and was assigned to 1st (Guards) Brigade as the RE component of an independent brigade group preparing for landings in North Africa (Operation Torch). On 7 August, the brigade joined the newly formed 78th Division and 214th Fd Co became part of 78th Divisional Engineers. The division embarked on 16 October and on 9 November its leading elements landed in North Africa with First Army, though 214th Fd Co did not reach the front until a month after the landings.

78th Division served through the whole Tunisian Campaign. During its attack to clear the Oued Zarga–Medjez el Bab road starting on 7 April 1943, the divisional engineers had to clear over 1000 mines in 48 hours, construct bridges, fords and culverts, and prepare the road for heavy tanks, all under frequent mortar fire. It was considered by the Chief Engineer 'one of the finest engineer achievements in the whole campaign'.

78th Division was transferred to Eighth Army after the German surrender at Tunis. It served in the Allied invasion of Sicily (Operation Husky) and landed on mainland Italy on 22 September 1943. The division led Eighth Army's advance up the east coast, its engineers bridging the River Biferno on 3 October. But The Germans counter-attacked (the Battle of Termoli) and part of the force was driven back across the river, which was in flood.

'To enable our tanks to recross, 214th Fd Co had hurriedly to construct a Class 30 bridge, consisting of a 100-ft Bailey bridge, across two demolished spans of the bridge on Highway 16, and a third repaired span. The bridge was built under fire, under incessant rain, four bricklayers laying 5,000 bricks in nine hours on the demolished piers. The bridge was completed in about thirty hours and allowed tanks to redress the battle' (RE History).

During the winter of 1943–4, 78th Division was transferred to 5th US Army in front of the Gustav Line, where the engineers' main task was to maintain and improve the mountain roads. It was the same in front of the Gothic Line the following autumn: as 78th Division slowly advanced towards the River Po it relied on a minor road codenamed 'Ace' that had to be constantly repaired kept clear of mud and snow. When it collapsed, the divisional and corps engineers had to be reinforced by a US engineer battalion before it could be repaired.

During the attack against the Argenta Gap on 12 April 1945, 78th Division's field companies acted in support of the leading brigades, repairing mine craters, clearing minefields and removing demolition charges, and laying several minor Bailey bridges. For the crossing of the Po by 56th (London) Division on 25 April, 214th Fd Co was lent to the assaulting brigade improve the approaches to the launching ramps. The Germans in Italy signed an instrument of surrender four days later, and 78th Division advanced to occupy part of Austria.

=== 215th Corps Field Park Company ===
The company was mobilised at Smethwick. It joined Northern Command in May 1940, and V Corps in September 1940. V CTRE was formed in Southern Command in June 1940, and served in Home Defence until it took part in the 'Torch' landings in November 1942. As with other engineers in the Tunisian campaign, much of the work was concerned with road repair and bridge building.

V Corps, including V CTRE, landed in the 'heel' of Italy in September 1943, and worked its way northwards up the east side of the country. By April 1945, it was engaged in bridging the River Senio and many other watercourses in the advance to the River Po. Here, V CTRE coordinated the 'Po Task Force' and collected all available stocks of Bailey material to bridge this major river and the River Adige beyond, during V Corps rapid advance to Venice (entered on 29 April).

=== 290th Army Field Company ===
The company was mobilised at Rowley Regis and went to France with the BEF as 290th (Staffordshire) Army Troops Company. After Dunkirk, it was assigned to Aldershot Command by September 1940 and was in the Middle East by December 1941. It was with Ninth Army by June 1943, and served in Italy in 1943–45.

=== 291st Army Field Company ===
The company was mobilised at Walsall and went to France with the BEF as 291st (South Staffordshire) Army Troops Company. After Dunkirk it was assigned to Northern Command, and then to London District (as part of the War Office Reserve) in December 1941. It went to Tunisia with First Army in December 1942, and then joined AFHQ in February 1943. It served in Italy in 1943–45.

=== 292nd Army Field Company ===
The company was mobilised in 'The Potteries' and was assigned to Western Command by May 1940. It was sent to North Africa later in the year and a section went to Greece in November. When the Germans invaded Greece in April the following year, the section was attached to 1st Armoured Brigade and was involved in blowing bridges ahead of the German advance, while the British forces withdrew towards the Thermopylae position and eventual evacuation.

=== 293rd Corps Field Park Company ===
The company was mobilised at Stafford and went to France with III CTRE. After evacuation from Dunkirk it served in Western Command and then Northern Ireland in October 1940. III CTRE was dispersed in April 1941 and there is no further information on the company.

All the TA companies were demobilised from September 1945 onwards.

== Postwar ==
When the TA was reconstituted in 1947, two RE regiments were formed with the same composition of companies (now termed squadrons) as the two 46th CTRE (North and South Staffordshire) units of 1939; both derived their seniority (1908) from the North Midland Divisional Engineers:

125 (Staffordshire) Army Engineer Regiment, RE

- HQ at Cannock
- 213 Field Park Squadron
- 214 Field Squadron
- 292 Field Squadron
- 293 Field Squadron

127 Construction Regiment, RE

- HQ at Smethwick
- 212 Construction Squadron
- 215 Plant Squadron
- 290 Construction Squadron
- 291 Construction Squadron

In 1950, 291 Sqn was transferred from 127 to 125 Rgt, and was replaced by 225 Sqn from 112 Construction Rgt at Birmingham (the former 48th (South Midland) Divisional Engineers). 290 and 292 Sqns became independent units in 1950 and 1952 respectively. In 1956, 215 and 291 Sqns were transferred to a newly formed 143 Plant Regiment, RE:

143 Plant Regiment, RE

- HQ at Walsall
- 215 Plant Squadron
- 276 Plant Squadron (from 102 Construction Regiment 1956, returned 1961)
- 291 Plant Squadron

293 Sqn was disbanded in 1961 (the year 125 Rgt regained its 'Staffordshire' title), and 127 Rgt (212 and 225 Sqns) was redesignated as 48th (South Midland) Division/District RE. The same year, 215 Sqn was absorbed by 291 Sqn, which replaced 143 Plant Rgt (276 Sqn returned to 102 Rgt).

When the TAVR was formed in 1967, 48th (SM) Divisional/District RE was disbanded, 125 Regiment (213 and 214 Sqns) was reduced to a single 125 (Staffordshire) Field Sqn, and provided some personnel to the Staffordshire Yeomanry, while 291 Sqn was redesignated 143 Plant Sqn. 143 Plant Sqn at Walsall was independent until 1 April 1992, when it was assigned to the Royal Monmouthshire Royal Engineers. 125 (Staffordshire) Field Sqn at Stoke was assigned to 75 Engineer Regiment in 1993, where it was joined by 143 Sqn on 1 April 1999. 143 Plant Sqn was disbanded on 1 April 2006 and 125 Field Sqn in 2014.

== External sources ==
- British Army site.
- British Army units from 1945 on
- The Drill Hall Project.
- UK Military Bridging – Floating Equipment, at Think Defence.
