= Sibbald baronets of Dunninald (1806) =

Escutcheon of the Scott baronets of Dunninald

The Sibbald, later Scott baronetcy, of Dunninald in the County of Forfar, was created in the Baronetage of the United Kingdom on 13 December 1806 for James Sibbald. The title became extinct on the death of the fifth Baronet in 1945.

== Sibbald, later Scott baronets, of Dunninald (1806) ==
- Sir James Sibbald, 1st Baronet (died 1819)
- Sir David Scott Scott, 2nd Baronet (1782–1851)
- Sir James Sibbald David Scott, 3rd Baronet (1814–1885)
- Sir Francis David Sibbald Scott, 4th Baronet (1851–1906)
- Sir Francis Montagu Sibbald Scott, 5th Baronet (1885–1945)

== Notes ==
Baronetage of the United Kingdom
Preceded by Bateman baronets	Sibbald baronets of Dunninald; 13 December 1806	Succeeded by Jones baronets
