= Scott baronets =

Set index for Scott baronets

There have been twelve baronetcies created for people with the surname Scott, one in the Baronetage of England, two in the Baronetage of Nova Scotia, and nine in the Baronetage of the United Kingdom.

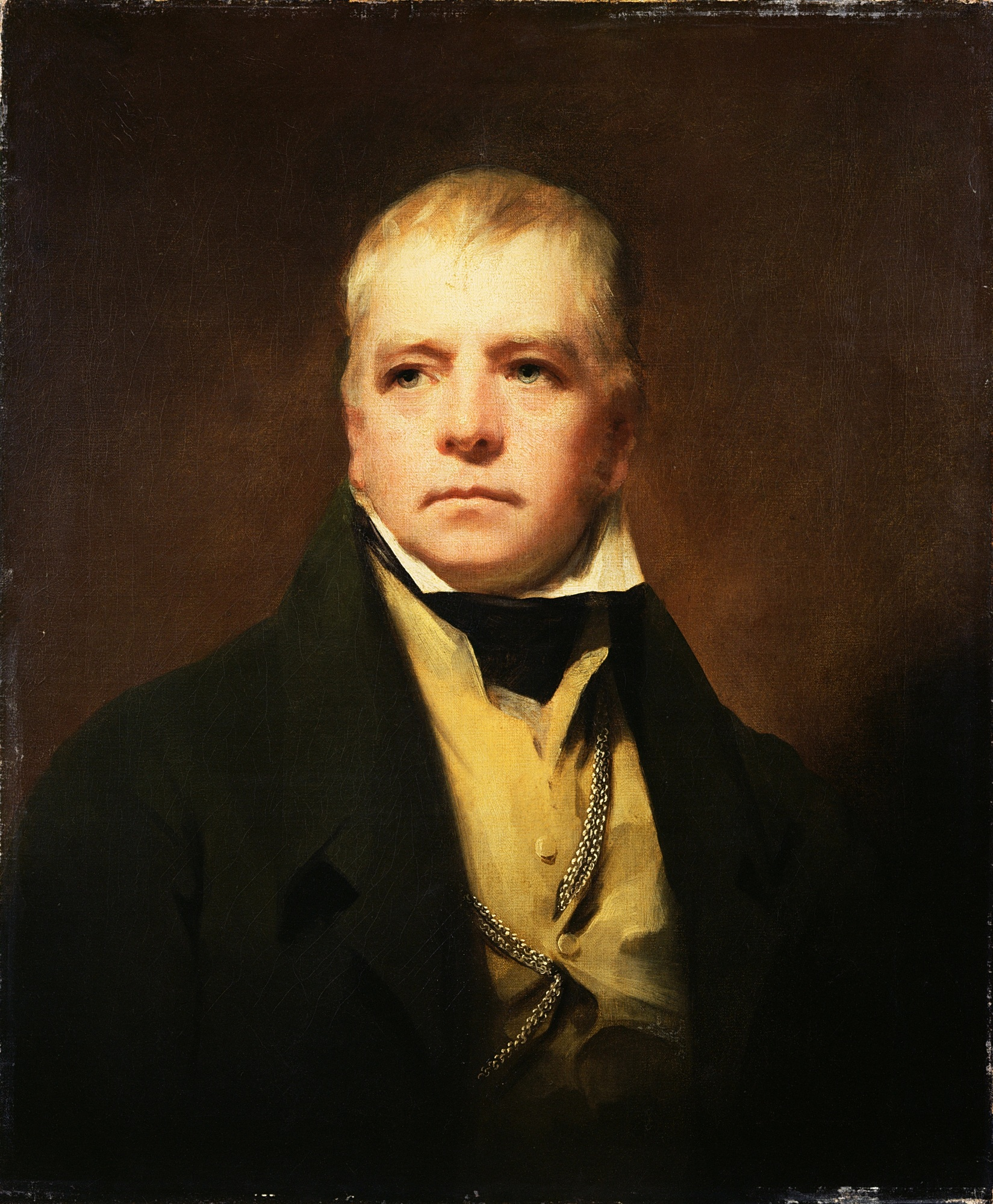
Sir Walter Scott, 1st Baronet of Abbotsford

- Scott baronets of Kew Green (1653)
- Scott baronets, of Thirlestane (1666): see the Lord Napier
- Scott baronets of Ancrum (1671)
- Scott baronets of Great Barr 1806
- Sibbald, later Scott baronets, of Dunninald (1806): see Sibbald baronets of Dunninald (1806)
- Scott baronets of Abbotsford (1820)
- Scott baronets of Lytchet Minster (1821)
- Scott baronets of Connaught Place (1899): see Sir John Scott, 1st Baronet of Connaught Place (1847–1912)
- Scott baronets of Beauclerc (1907)
- Scott baronets of the Yews (1909)
- Scott baronets of Witley (1913)
- Scott baronets of Rotherfield Park (1962)
