= Cecil Wingfield-Stratford =

English footballer (1853-1939)

Brigadier-General Cecil Wingfield-Stratford CB CMG
- Born: Cecil Vernon Wingfield-Stratford; 7 October 1853; West Malling, England
- Died: 5 February 1939 (aged 85)
- Relatives: Esmé Cecil Wingfield-Stratford (son)
Association football career
- Position: Forward
Senior career*
Years	Team	Apps	(Gls)
- Royal Engineers
International career
1877	England	1	(0)
- * Club domestic league appearances and goals

Brigadier-General Cecil Vernon Wingfield-Stratford CB CMG (7 October 1853 – 5 February 1939) was a British Army officer in the Royal Engineers and an England international footballer who played as a forward.

== Early life ==
Born in West Malling, Wingfield-Stratford was educated at the Royal Military Academy, Woolwich, a descendant of the ancient Stratford Family. He married Rosalind Isabel Bligh, daughter of Reverend Hon. Edward Vesey Bligh and Lady Isabel Mary Frances Nevill, on 12 October 1881. They had one son, Esmé Cecil Wingfield-Stratford.

== Sporting career ==
Wingfield-Stratford played as outside-left for the Woolwich Academy and for Royal Engineers, and earned one cap for England versus Scotland in 1877.

He was described by C.W. Alcock as "very fast and useful as a wing; wants a little more 'last'[presumably meaning staying-power]." He took part in the replayed 1875 FA Cup final, both matches taking place at Kennington Oval when his team won the Final for their only time, against Old Etonians. The first match, on 13 March, ended in a 1–1 draw after extra time but the replay, three days later, ended in a conclusive 2–0 score. The Engineers' scorer in both matches, coincidentally, was Henry Waugh Renny-Tailyour who in September the same year married a sister of Wingfield-Stratford.

He also played for M.C.C.

== Military career ==
Wingfield-Stratford was commissioned into the Royal Engineers as Lieutenant in 1873. He ultimately retired as Brigadier-General in 1909 after being Chief Engineer in Ireland since 1906, without seeing any campaign service. However, he was recalled from retirement to serve in World War I in 1914 and held command on the Western Front, taking part in the Battle of Loos in 1915, the Attack on the Gommecourt Salient on the first day of the Battle of the Somme in 1916, and was Commander R.E. of the 46th Division. He was mentioned in despatches four times and awarded the C.M.G. in 1916 and C.B. in 1918.

== Later life ==
Wingfield-Stratford died in retirement aged eighty-five at Fartherwell, West Malling, on 5 February 1939.
