= Sir Francis Scott, 3rd Baronet =

English landowner

Sir Francis Edward Scott, 3rd Baronet (25 February 1824 – 21 November 1863) was an English landowner.

On birth he succeeded his maternal grandfather Sir Hugh Bateman to the Baronetcy (but not the estates) of Bateman of Hartington, Derbyshire to become 2nd Baronet of Hartington.

He was the son of Sir Edward Scott, 2nd Baronet of Great Barr Hall, then Staffordshire who had married on 14 February 1815 Catherine Juliana Bateman, eldest daughter and co-heir of Sir Hugh Bateman, Bart. In 1851 he succeeded his father to also become 3rd Baronet Scott of Great Barr.

He was commissioned as Captain of the Walsall Troop of the Staffordshire Yeomanry on 7 August 1847 and remained with the regiment until about 1854. He was one of the original officers of the 1st Staffordshire Rifle Volunteer Corps raised at Handsworth on 15 August 1859 during a French invasion scare.

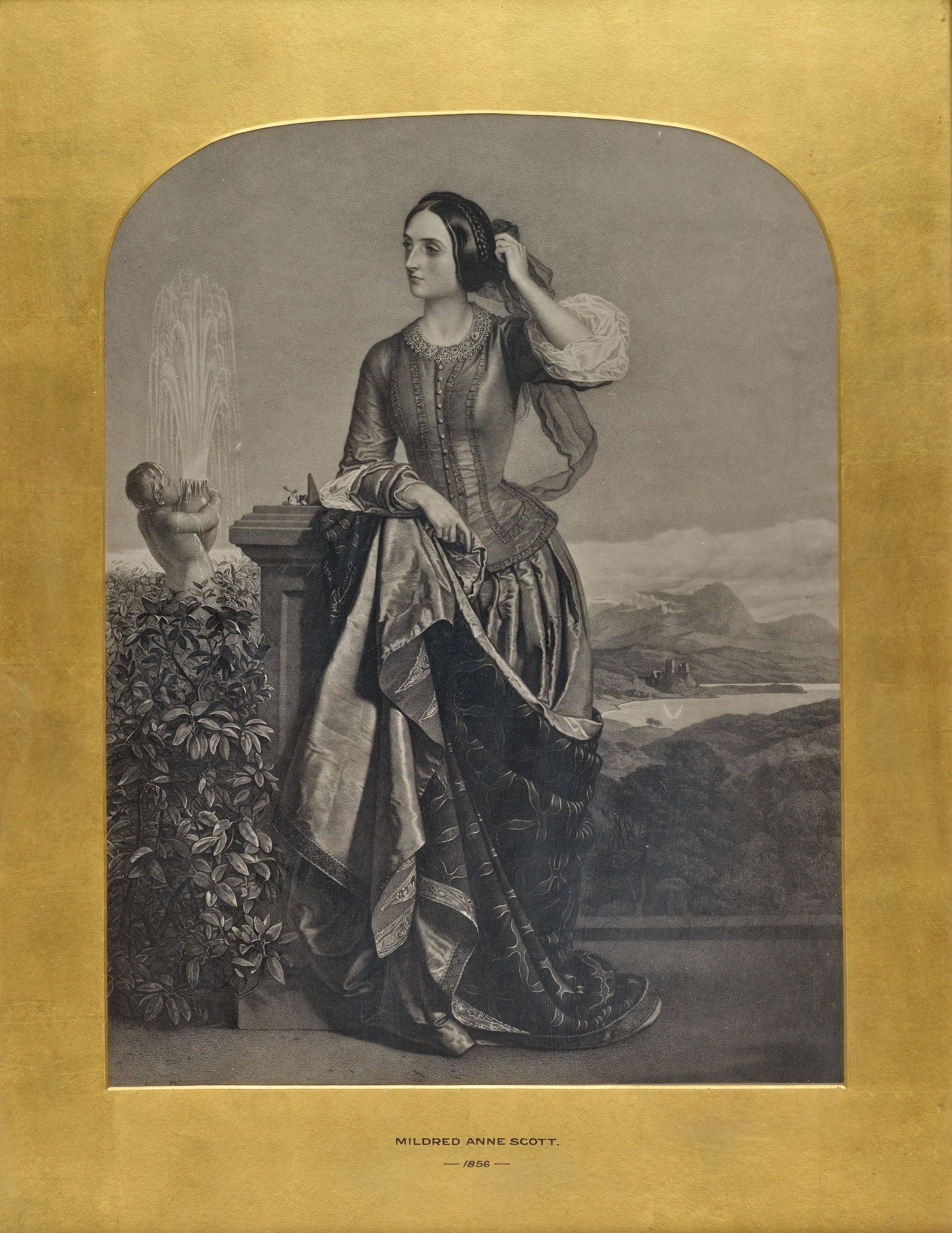
Mildred Anne Scott by Thomas Herbert Maguire, after Robert Thorburn

He married on 5 January 1854 Mildred Anne Cradock-Hartopp (1827–1909), (Note: After Scott's death, Mildred married Edward Pakenham Alderson, eldest son of Sir Edward Hall Alderson, on 12 September 1868; he died on 3 December 1876)) daughter of Sir William Cradock-Hartopp, 3rd Baronet of Four Oaks Hall, Sutton Coldfield, (See Cradock-Hartopp baronets), by whom he had the following children:

- Sir Edward William Dolman Scott, 4th and 3rd Baronet, born 23 December 1854, died unmarried 1 April 1871.
- Sir Arthur Douglas Bateman Scott, 5th and 4th Baronet, born 3 September 1860, Captain, Staffordshire Yeomanry, died unmarried 18 March 1884, when he was succeeded by his uncle Sir Edmund Dolman Scott.
- Mildred Henrietta, married 12 October 1876, as 2nd wife, to Adrian Elias Hope, Esq. (Bart.)
- Catherine Matilda Annie Georgina, married William Edward John Basil Farnham (in 1887, High Sheriff of Leicestershire)
- Mabel Augusta

== Notes ==
Baronetage of the United Kingdom
Preceded by Edward Scott	Baronet (of Great Barr); 1851–1863	Succeeded by Edward Scott
Preceded by Hugh Bateman	Baronet (of Hartington Hall); 1824–1863	Succeeded by Edward Scott
