= Scott baronets of Ancrum (1671) =

Escutcheon of the Scott baronets of Ancrum

The Scott baronetcy, of Ancrum in the County of Roxburgh, was created in the Baronetage of Nova Scotia on 27 October 1671 for John Scott. The title became extinct on the death of the seventh Baronet in 1902.

== Scott baronets, of Ancrum (1671) ==
- Sir John Scott, 1st Baronet of Ancrum (died 1712)
- Sir Patrick Scott, 2nd Baronet (died 1734)
- Sir John Scott, 3rd Baronet (died 1746)
- Sir William Scott, 4th Baronet (died 1769)
- Sir John Scott, 5th Baronet (died 1812)
- Sir William Scott, 6th Baronet (1803–1871)
- Sir William Monteath Scott, 7th Baronet (1829–1902)
