= Scott baronets of Great Barr =

Baronetcy in the Baronetage of the United Kingdom

Scott baronetcy
- Creation date: 30 April 1806
- Created by: George IV
- First holder: Joseph Scott

The Scott baronetcy, of Great Barr in the County of Stafford, was a baronetcy created in the Baronetage of the United Kingdom on 30 April 1806 for Joseph Scott of Great Barr Hall, Member of Parliament for Worcester.

The family were, until the early 20th century, owners of Barr Beacon.

The family name is remembered in the nearby Scott Arms pub and shopping centre.

== Early baronets ==
The third Baronet had already succeeded to the Bateman baronetcy of Hartington Hall when he inherited the baronetcy in 1851. However, the two titles separated on the death of the sixth Baronet in 1905, when the Bateman baronetcy was inherited by the fourth of the Fuller-Acland-Hood baronets of St Audries.

The sixth Baronet, Sir Edward Dolman Scott, uncle of the 5th, was a distinguished naval officer, Commander of HMS Marlborough and HMS Centurion.

== Seventh Baronet ==
The seventh Baronet, the Reverend Sir Douglas Edward Scott, an only child whose father died when he was just nine months old, was declared bankrupt while curate-in-charge of Winterbourne, Dorset, and again in 1914 while rector of Teffont Evias near Salisbury. He was convicted of bigamy in 1918 and imprisoned. His grandfather was the Reverend William Scott, rector of Aldridge. His uncles were the Reverend William Henry Scott, first vicar of Great Barr, and major-general Douglas Scott of the Madras Army. At the time of his death in 1951, the seventh Baronet was living as the paying lodger of a married couple in a small bungalow in Wokingham.

== Eighth Baronet ==
The eighth Baronet, Edward Arthur Dolman Scott, known as Ted, emigrated to Australia at the age of 17, and was living in the Adelaide suburb of South Plympton when elevated to the baronetcy. He worked as a house painter and died of cancer in January 1980. His wife, Lady Scott, a hairdresser, was paid thousands of Australian dollars in an out-of-court settlement after suing Bowater-Scott, who had invited customers to "have an affair with Lady Scott", as part of an advertising campaign for toilet paper, featuring a fictitious character of that name. Their only child was a daughter, Jeanette, who could not inherit the male-only baronetcy. Ted had a younger brother, Douglas Francis (born 1908) who did not claim the baronetcy, reputedly due to a head injury, and another brother, John Esmond, who had died in 1938 aged 24.

The baronetcy is now extinct.

== Title holders ==
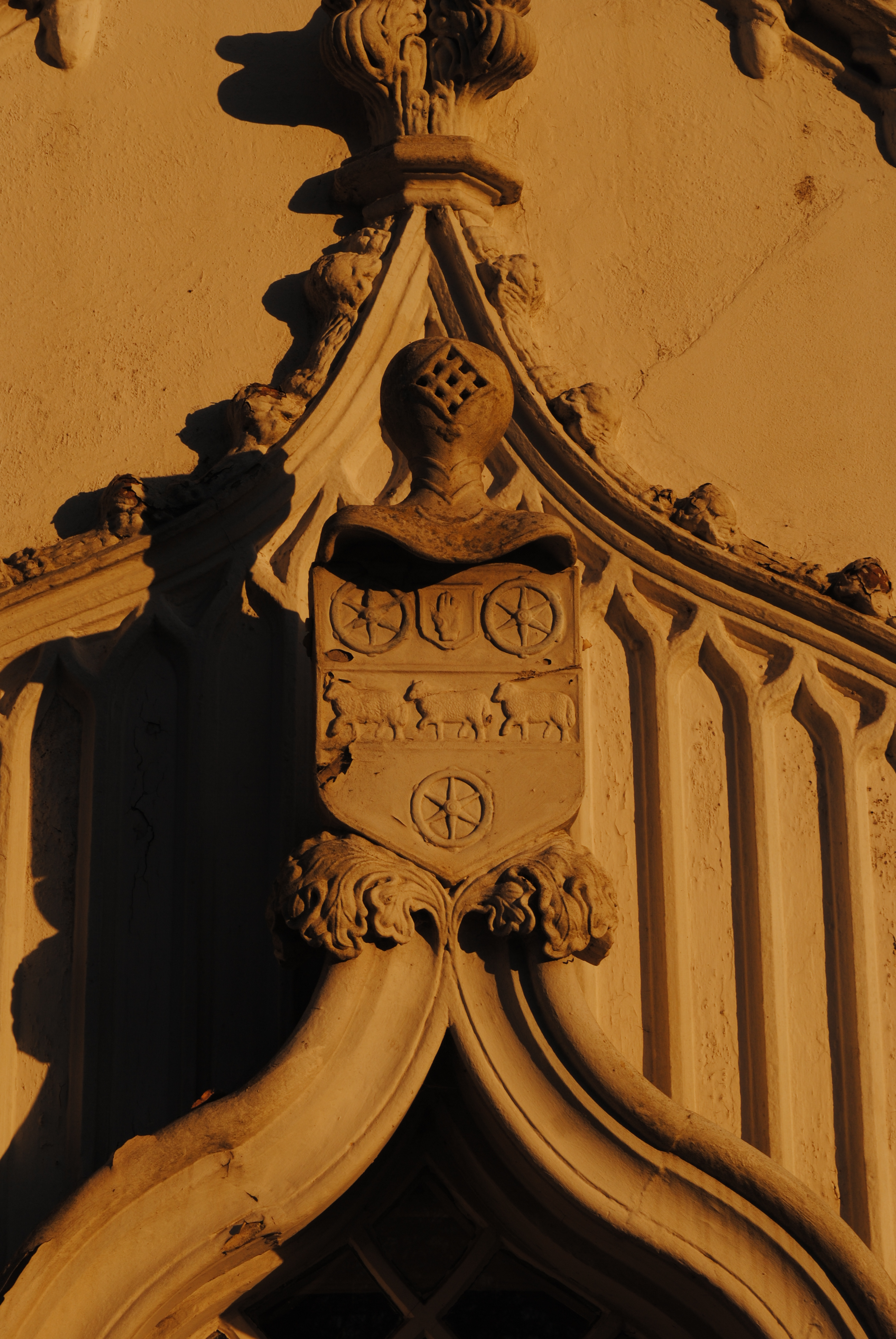
Scott family coat of arms on Handsworth Lodge at Great Barr Hall

- Sir Joseph Scott, 1st Baronet (1752–1828)
- Sir Edward Dolman Scott, 2nd Baronet (1793–1851)
- Sir Francis Edward Scott, 3rd Baronet (1824–1863)
- Sir Edward William Dolman Scott, 4th Baronet (1854–1871)
- Sir Arthur Douglas Bateman Scott, 5th Baronet (1860–1884)
- Sir Edward Dolman Scott, 6th Baronet (1826–1905) – brother of the 3rd Baronet
- Reverend Sir Douglas Edward Scott, 7th Baronet (1863–1951)
- Sir Edward Arthur Dolman Scott, 8th Baronet (1905–1980)

Baronetage of the United Kingdom
Preceded by Lubbock baronets	Scott baronets of Great Barr; 30 April 1806	Succeeded by Morris baronets
