= Scott baronets of Rotherfield Park (1962) =

The Scott baronetcy, of Rotherfield Park in the County of Southampton, was created in the Baronetage of the United Kingdom on 16 February 1962 for Jervoise Bolitho Scott. He was for many years a member of the Hampshire County Council. His son, the second Baronet, served as Lord Lieutenant of Hampshire from 1982 to 1993.

== Scott baronets, of Rotherfield Park (1962) ==
- Sir Jervoise Bolitho Scott, 1st Baronet (1892–1965)
- Sir James Walter Scott, 2nd Baronet (1924–1993)
- Sir James Jervoise Scott, 3rd Baronet (born 1952)

The heir apparent is the present holder's son Arthur Jervoise Trafford Scott (born 1984).

Coat of arms of Scott baronets of Rotherfield Park
Crest Out of a circlet of pales or a cubit arm erect habited gules cuffed ermine the hand proper holding a paper scroll argent. Escutcheon Per pale indented argent and sable a saltire counterchanged. Motto In Christo salus, Salvation is in Christ.
