= Scott baronets of Kew Green (1653) =

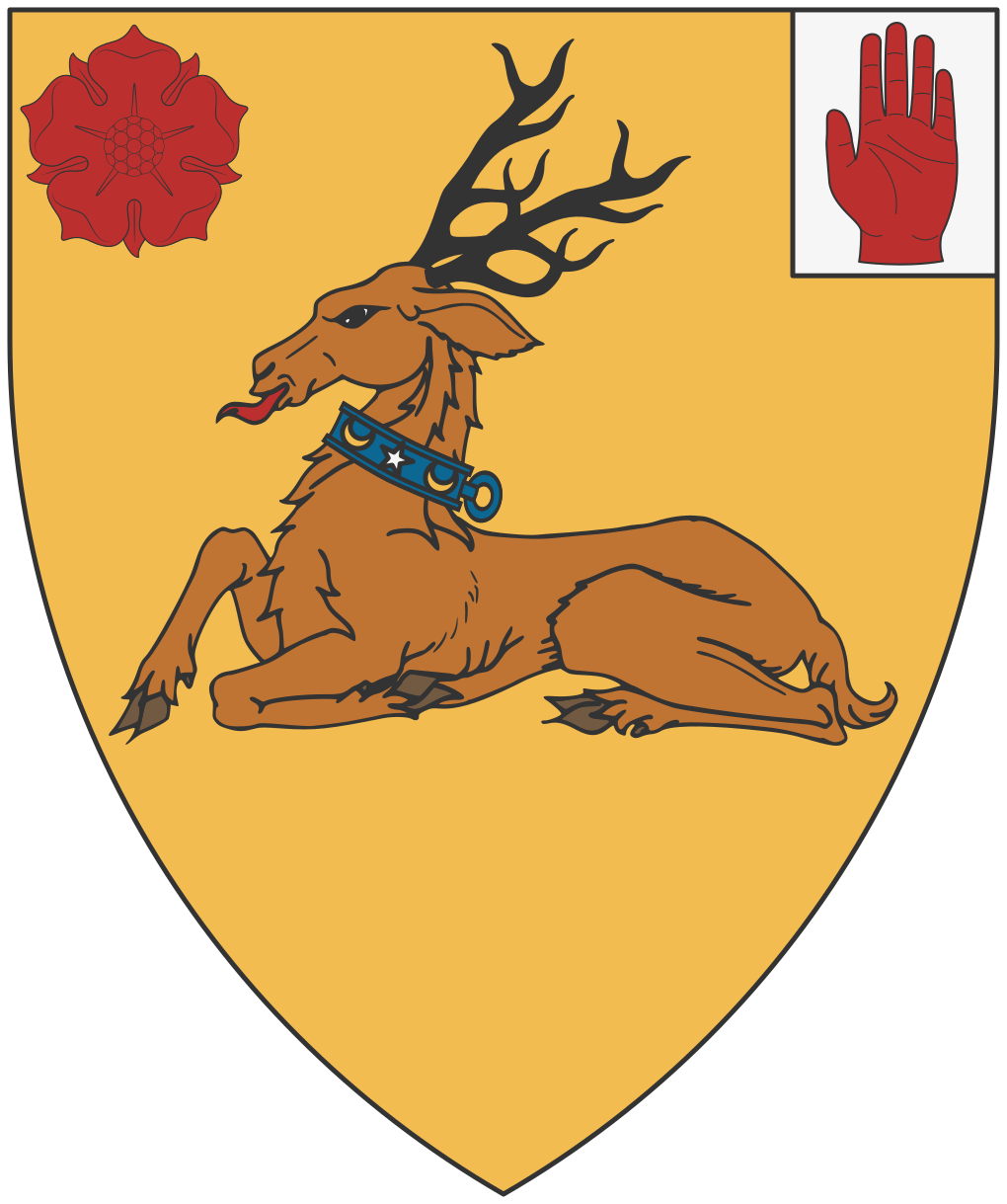
The coat of arms of the Scott baronets

The Scott Baronetcy, of Kew Green in the County of Middlesex, was created in the Baronetage of England on 9 August 1653 for William Scott. The title became either extinct or dormant on the death of the fourth Baronet c. 1775.

== Scott baronets, of Kew Green (1653) ==
- Sir William Scott, 1st Baronet (died 1681)
- Sir William Scott, 2nd Baronet (died c. 1700)
- Sir William Scott, 3rd Baronet (died 1723)
- Sir William Scott, 4th Baronet (died c. 1775)
