= Bateman baronets of How Hall (1664) =

Baronetcy

Escutcheon of the Bateman baronets of How Hall

The Bateman baronetcy, of How Hall in the County of Norfolk, was created in the Baronetage of England on 31 August 1664 for Thomas Bateman, a London merchant. He was a son of Richard Bateman, a younger son of Richard Bateman of Hartington. He had served as High Sheriff of Cambridgeshire and Huntingdonshire in 1657 and 1658, and Alderman for the London ward of Walbrook from 17 April 1662 until 1664. He had no children, and on his death on 13 October 1685 the baronetcy became extinct.

== Bateman baronets, of How Hall (1664) ==
- Sir Thomas Bateman, 1st Baronet (1622–1685)
